= List of dedicated deck card games =

Modern games with a unique set of cards and no board

This is a list of notable dedicated deck card games, which use neither standard playing cards nor collectible trading cards.

Name	Description	Originally published
5 Alive	A shedding game.	1990
6 nimmt!	A hand management game.	1994
Armchair cricket	A simulation game.	1981
Authors	A matching game.	1861
Black Peter (card game)	A matching and shedding game.	circa 1840
Bottle Imp	A trick-taking game.	1995
Card Football Premiere Edition	A simulation game.	2004
Clue Quest	Players make words using cards.	1987
Cuccù	A 40-card game in the Cuckoo group.	18th Century
Dominion	A deck-building game.	2008
Dutch Blitz	A matching and shedding game.	1960
Experiment	A matching game.	2006
Exploding Kittens	A casual dedicated deck card game.	
Flinch	A matching and shedding game.	1901
Fluxx	A multi-genre matching game notable for victory conditions changing throughout the game.	1997
Five Crowns	A rummy-style card game using decks with five suits.	1996
Glory to Rome	A card game where each card can be used in several ways.	2005
Gnav	A 42-card or men game in the Cuckoo group.	1820s
Great Dalmuti	A variant of Asshole.	1995
Haggis	A trick-taking game.	2010
Hanabi	A cooperative game.	2010
Happy Families	A matching game.	circa 1851
Kille (card game)	A 42-card game in the Cuckoo group.	18th Century
Kvitlech	A 24-card comparing game	Late 18th or 19th Century
Lexicon	A word and shedding card game.	1932
Ligretto	A shedding card game.	1988
Lindy	A specialty or multi-genre card game published by Parker Brothers in 1927, in honor of the solo transatlantic flight of Charles Lindbergh. The game was styled as "A Sequel to the Famous Parker Game Touring," with airplane flight as the theme rather than automobile travel. A similar game was marketed by Nucraft Toys as The Lindy Flying Game, also in 1927, which became the focus of a lawsuit filed by Parker Brothers.	1927
Love Letter	16 card deck.	2012
The Make My Day Card Game	A political satire game.	1987
Monopoly Deal	A derivation of the board game.	2008
Make-A-Million	A trick-taking game.	1934
Mille Bornes	A specialty or multi-genre game.	1954
Munchkin	A humorous, simplified RPG.	2001
Old Maid	The Game of Old Maid (Parker Brothers, 1880s), also known as Matrimony (McLoughlin Brothers, 1890s), The Merry Game of Old Maid (McLoughlin Brothers, 1898), and others, was originally a dedicated-deck game; a matching and shedding game.	19th Century
ONO 99	An adding game.	1980
Phase 10	A matching and shedding game.	1982
Pit	A matching game.	1904
Quartets	A matching game.	1960s
Quiddler	A rummy-like word game.	1998
Rack-O	A Milton Bradley sequential-matching game. A hand is won by the player to acquire first a series of ten cards in numeric order and call "Rack-O!" The game is now marketed by Winning Moves Games.	1956
Rage	A trick-taking game.	1983
Renfield	A trick-taking game.	1999
Rook	A trick-taking game.	1906
Set	A real-time matching game.	1991
Skip-Bo	A rummy-like shedding game.	1967
Tichu	A trick-taking game.	1991
Top Trumps	A data comparison game.	1978
Touring	A specialty or multi-genre game.	1906
Uno	A shedding game.	1971
Vogelspiel	A 32-card game in the Cuckoo group.	18th Century
Waterworks	A matching game from Parker Brothers, the object of which is for each player to create a pipeline of a designated length, beginning with a valve and ending with a spout. The game is now sold by Winning Moves Games.	1972
Whot!	A shedding game.	1935
Wizard	A trick-taking game.	1984
Xactika	A bidding and trick-taking game.	2002
