= List of traditional card and tile packs =

This is a list of traditional sets of playing cards or gaming tiles such as mahjong tiles or dominoes that are still in modern use. A typical traditional pack of playing cards consists of up to 52 regular cards, organized into four suits, and optionally some additional cards meant for playing, such as jokers or tarot trumps. The cards of each suit typically form a hierarchy of ranks. However, some traditional packs, especially from Asia, follow a different scheme.

== French suited ==
French-suited cards are the most popular design and can be found in most countries. Historically, kings were the highest cards and aces were the lowest, and this hierarchy is sometimes still prescribed for cutting. Aces are now the most common high card in most games. In ace–ten card games such as pinochle, tens have the second-highest card-point value and therefore tend to rank high between ace and king rather than in their natural position. Other common high cards are twos, threes, and jacks.

=== Full French-suited ===
The full French-suited pack contains 52 cards, organized into the 4 French card suits spades, clubs, diamonds and hearts and 13 ranks. The modern common hierarchy is ace > king > queen > jack > 10 > 9 > 8 > 7 > 6 > 5 > 4 > 3 > 2, i.e. aces are high and twos are low. Another common hierarchy is king > queen > jack > 10 > 9 > 8 > 7 > 6 > 5 > 4 > 3 > 2 > ace, i.e. kings are high and aces are low. Many decks in France and Belgium use the numeral "1" for the ace. Full French-suited packs often contain anywhere from one to four jokers with two being the most common, which are needed for some games. Zwickern decks come with six jokers. Jokers have neither suit nor rank. Some packs are sold with accessories needed for specific games like cribbage boards, bidding boxes, or cut cards.

Double packs (2x52 plus jokers) and triple packs (3x52 plus jokers) with the same back designs are sold for Canasta and Samba. These decks may contain point values marked on the cards.

=== Stripped French-suited ===
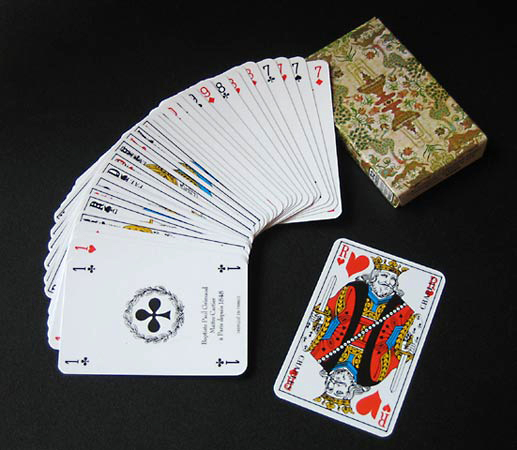
Stripped French 32-card deck.

24-card stripped decks are often sold in Germany and Austria for Schnapsen. These decks go from nines to aces in each suit. Doubled versions of this deck (2x24) are used to play Pinochle and Doppelkopf.

32-card packs have ranks seven through ace in each suit and are very common in Europe. They are used to play Piquet, Belote, Skat, Klaverjas, and Préférence. Doubled decks (2x32) are sold for Bezique. They are sometimes known as Piquet packs.

36-card packs go from ranks six through ace in each suit. This pack is in use in western Switzerland as the French-suited Jass pack and is quite common in Russia for playing Durak. It was once used to play Piquet until the sixes were dropped.

40-card packs are found mostly in Latin countries where they compete against local Italian or Spanish suited decks. These sets range from two to seven and jack to ace in each suit. An exception is Portugal where the ranks go from two to six, eight, and jack to ace.

=== Expanded French-suited ===
63-card packs are produced for playing the six-handed version of 500, a variant of Euchre. These decks add elevens, twelves, red thirteens, and a single joker to the standard 52 card pack. The decks are mostly sold in the United States, Canada, Australia, New Zealand, and the United Kingdom.

=== French-suited tarot ===
The 78-card Tarot Nouveau deck is the most widely used set for Tarot card games in France, Belgium, Denmark, and parts of Switzerland. A full set contains the standard 52 cards plus a Knight face card for each suit ranking between the queen and jack. Aces are marked with "1" and are the lowest ranked cards. There are 21 numbered trump cards and one unnumbered and suitless card, The Fool, which excuses the player from following suit.

The 54-card Cego and Industrie und Glück decks omit the aces through sixes in black suits and fives through tens in the red suits. They are found in Germany, Switzerland, and throughout the former Austro-Hungarian empire. In games played with these decks, The Fool is part of the trump suit. Plain suit cards don't have corner indexes.

== German suited ==
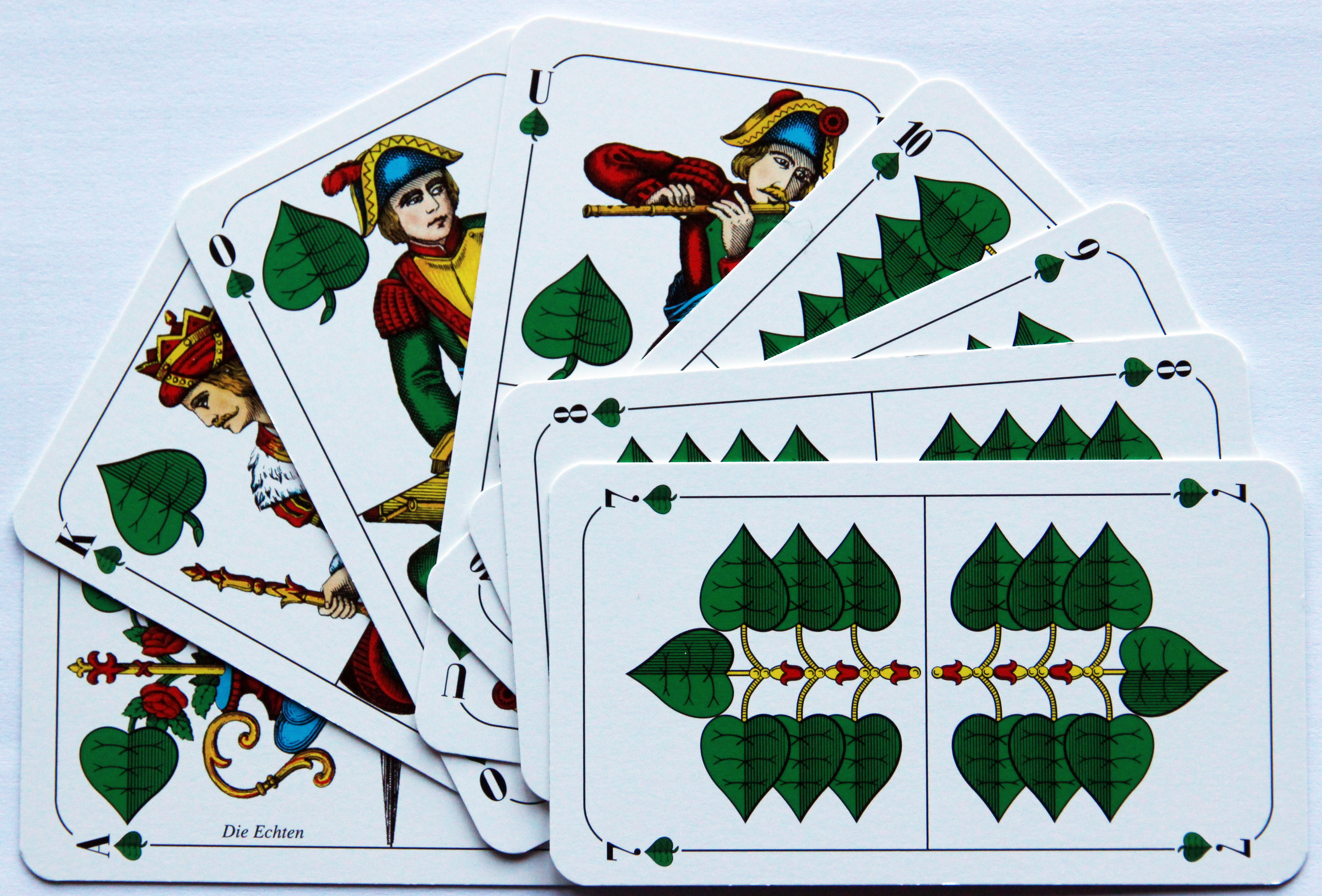
The suit of Leaves from a Bavarian pattern pack

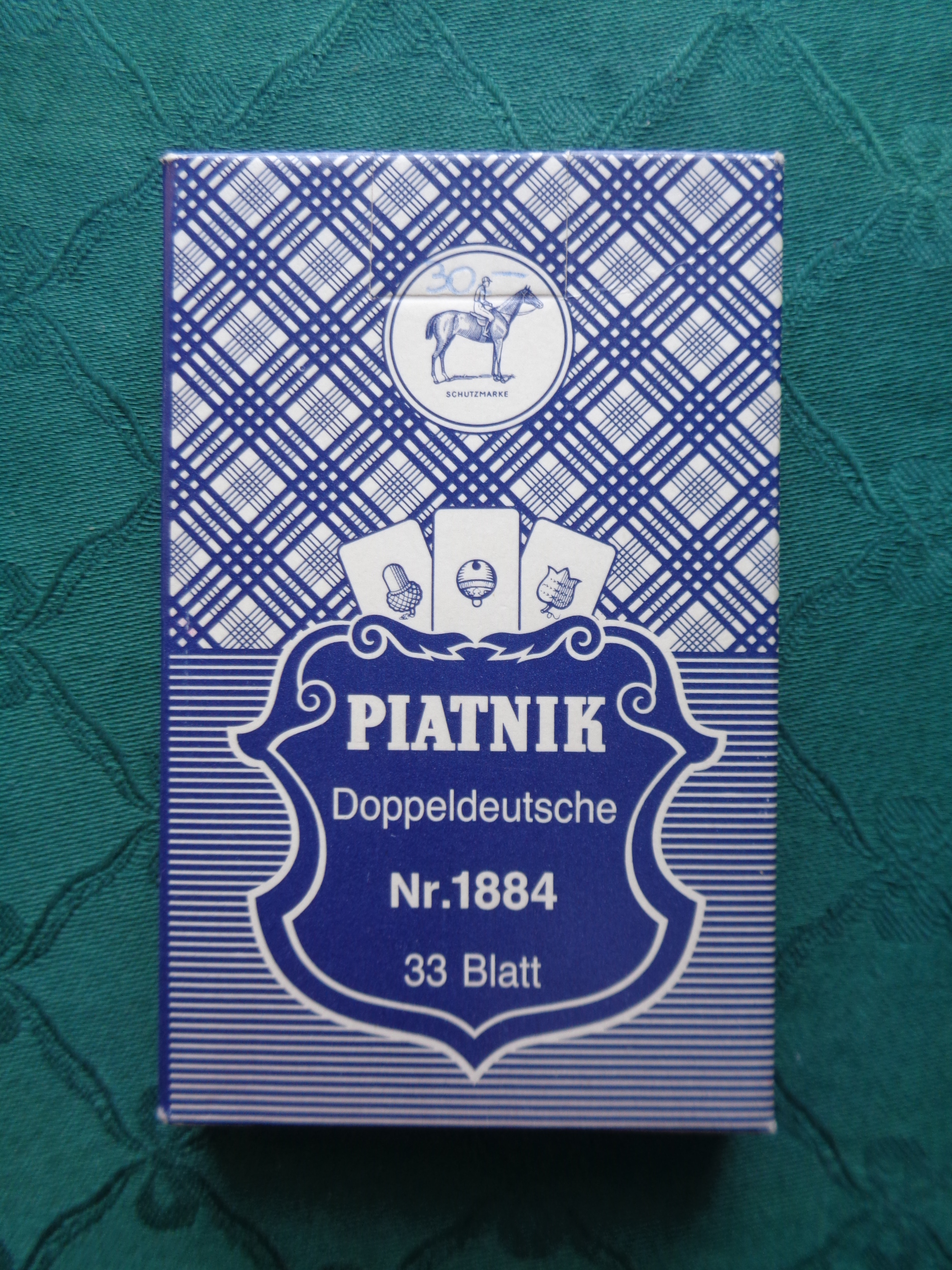
Austrian Piatnik 33-card pack

German-suited cards are still common in large parts of Central Europe, although they generally compete with French-suited cards, which are often more popular.

=== Full German-suited ===
Full German-suited packs are largely confined to southern Germany and Austria where Bavarian Tarock, Tapp, Bauerntarock and Jass are played. They contain 36 cards, organized into the four German suits of Acorns, Leaves, Hearts and Bells and 9 ranks. The role of the queen is played by another male figure, the Ober, and that of the jack by the Unter. The Ober has its suit sign placed in a high position and the Unter in a lower position. Aces are styled as Deuces. The modern natural hierarchy is ace > king > Ober > Unter > ten > 9 > 8 > 7 > 6, i.e. aces are high. In Austria and South Tyrol, the six of bells is often used as a wild card known as the Weli.

Italian manufacturers also started producing 40-card packs for South Tyrol since the 1980s. This set includes the 5s which allows players to play Italian card games that require 40 cards.

=== Standard German-suited ===
This is a German-suited pack without the sixes, as used for many Central European games such as Skat, Schafkopf and Sixty-Six / Mariáš. Some packs add the Six of Bells to make it into a 33-card deck.

=== Stripped German-suited ===
24-card sets are available for Schnapsen. They go from ranks nine to ace in each deck. The doubled deck version (2x24) is used for Doppelkopf. Another doubled deck version for Binokel and Gaigel replaces rank nine with sevens.

== Swiss suited ==
Swiss-suited cards are commonly used only in part of the German-speaking area of Switzerland and Liechtenstein. Locally they are known as "German" cards.

=== Jass ===
The only frequently encountered Swiss-suited pack is known as the Jass pack. It contains 36 cards and is very similar to the southern German-suited pack. The main difference is that instead of leaves and hearts there are shields and roses, and the ten is styled as a banner.

=== Kaiser ===
The 48-card Kaiser pack is only produced to play Kaiserspiel, which requires 40 or 48 cards. If the banner and deuce are regarded as a ten and ace, the pack is equivalent to an extended Jass pack. If the banner and deuce are regarded as ace and deuce, the pack is equivalent to a full Spanish-suited pack.

== Spanish suited ==
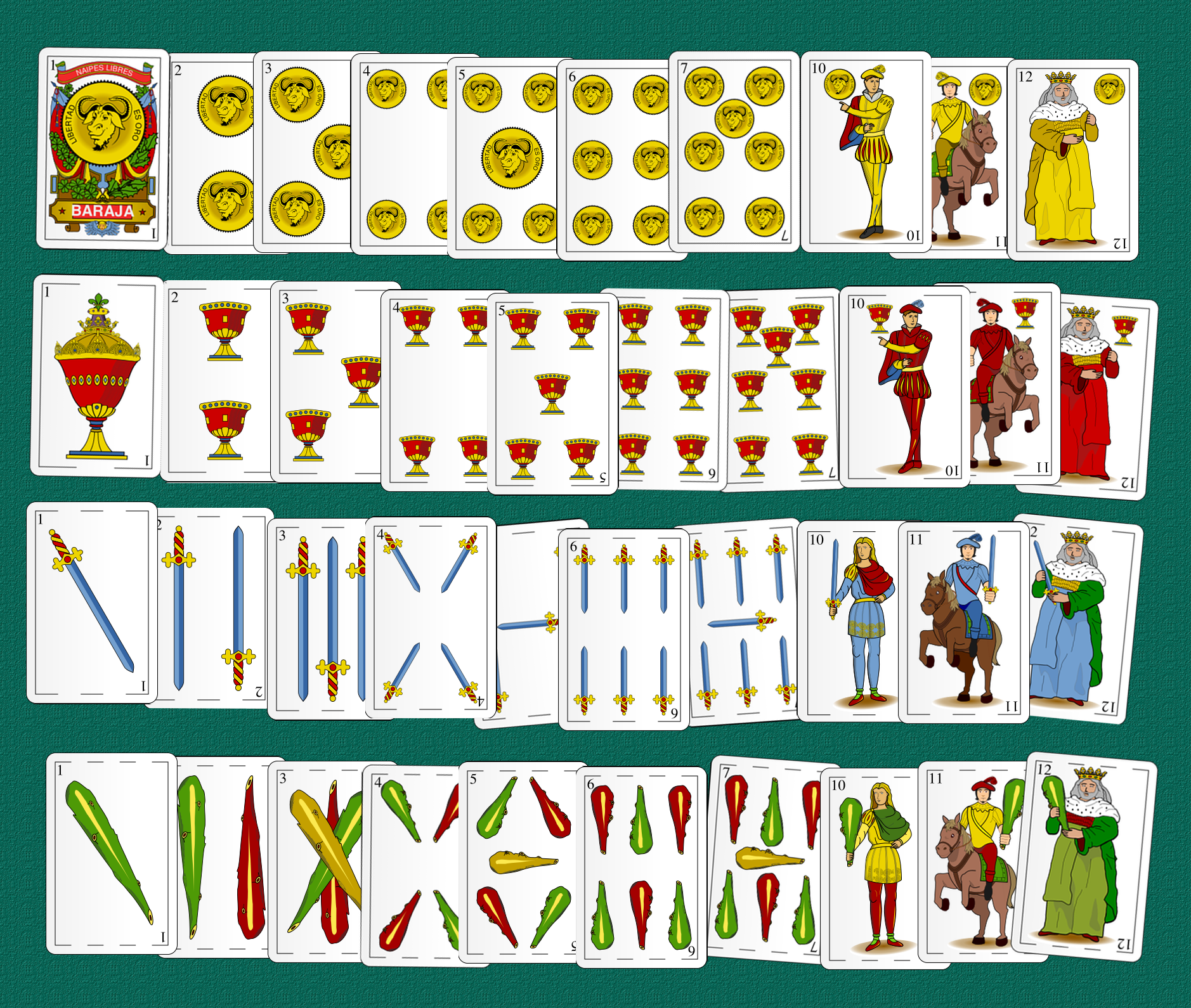
Standard Spanish-suited pack of 40 cards

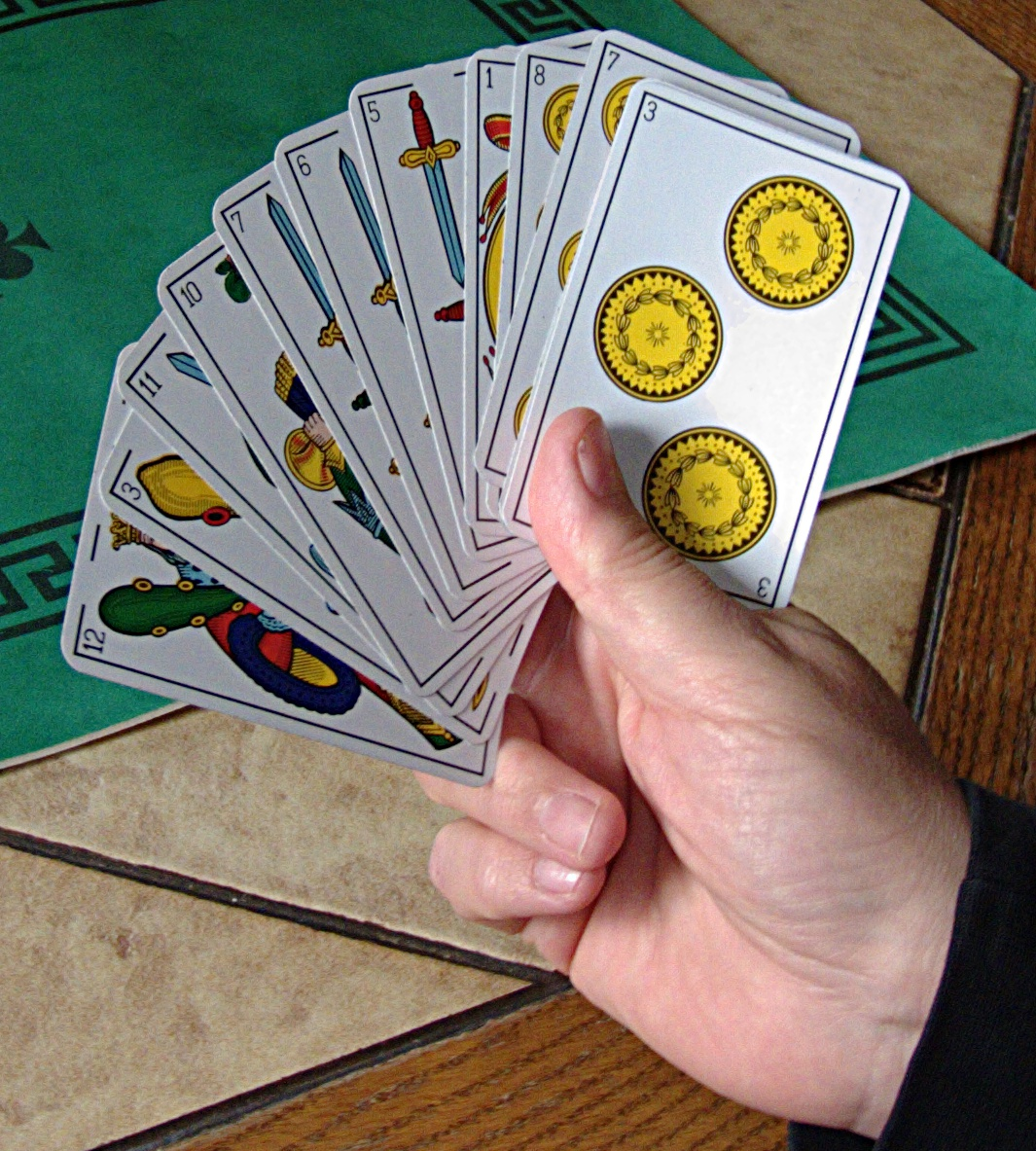
A man displays French Catalan pattern-style cards

Spanish-suited cards are used in most Spanish-speaking countries and in the south of Italy.

=== Full Spanish-suited ===
The full Spanish-suited pack contains 48 cards, organized into the 4 Spanish suits coins, cups, swords and clubs and 12 ranks. These decks usually include two jokers. The court cards are usually numbered. The role of the queen is played by the caballo (cavalier), visually distinct from the sota (jack) by riding a horse. The common ranking from to low to high is 2, 3, 4, 5, 6, 7, 8, 9, jack (10), cavalier (11), king (12), and ace (1).

=== Standard Spanish-suited ===
The standard Spanish-suited pack consists of 40 cards in the ranks ace, king, cavalier, jack and 2–7. Court cards retain the same numbering as in the full pack (10, 11, 12), skipping numbers 8 and 9.

== Portuguese suited ==
Portuguese-suited playing cards are a near-extinct system that features dragons, female knaves, and the suits of coins, clubs, cups, and swords. Despite sharing the same Spanish suits, the clubs and swords are crossed like the patterns in Italian-suited cards.

=== Full Portuguese-suited ===
Komatsufuda is a Japanese 48-card deck used today in Yafune, Fukui prefecture. It features an abstract design for their cards to avoid gambling restrictions. The aces are dragons and the ranks are the same as the full Spanish-suited decks, making them functionally the same.

=== Expanded Portuguese-suited ===
Unsun Karuta is a Japanese 75-card deck used today in Hitoyoshi, Kumamoto. It features a fifth Guru suit (circular whirls) and three additional ranks: "Un," "Sun," and dragons.

=== Portuguese-suited tarot ===
The uncommon 64-card Tarocco Siciliano set uses Spanish-styled straight swords and crude clubs like other southern Italian decks. It omits the two and three of coins, and numerals one to four in clubs, swords and cups. One card, the ace of coins, is almost never used as it was added solely for the purpose of the stamp tax. It is one of the rare sets to feature female knaves. Like other tarot decks there are four court ranks, a fool, and a fifth trump suit. Unlike other tarot decks, the trumps start with 0 and end in 20, with only the 0th trump being named "Miseria." This set does not feature dragons.

== Italian suited ==
Italian-suited cards are used only in the north of Italy.

=== Full Italian-suited ===
The full Italian-suited pack contains 52 cards, organized into the 4 Spanish suits swords, batons, cups and coins and 13 ranks. It is very similar to the full Spanish-suited pack, but does have tens as pip cards.

=== Standard Italian-suited ===
Like the standard Spanish-suited pack, the standard Italian-suited pack consists of 40 cards in the ranks ace, king, cavalier, knave and 2–7.

=== Italian-suited tarot ===
Italian game packs are largely confined to Italy and parts of Switzerland. Among them, the 78-card Tarocco Piemontese is the most popular. Each suit now includes the queen between the king and knight. The hierarchy of the pip cards depends on its suit. The Fool is labelled 0 while trump 20 is usually the strongest, even beating trump 21.

A rarer 78-card set is the Swiss 1JJ Tarot found in a few pockets in Switzerland. Despite using Italian suits, the trumps are labelled in French.

The 62-card Tarocco Bolognese omits pip cards 2 to 5, has Ace instead of 1, and makes the bottom four of the trumps equal in rank. It is used to play Tarocchini.

== Ganjifa ==
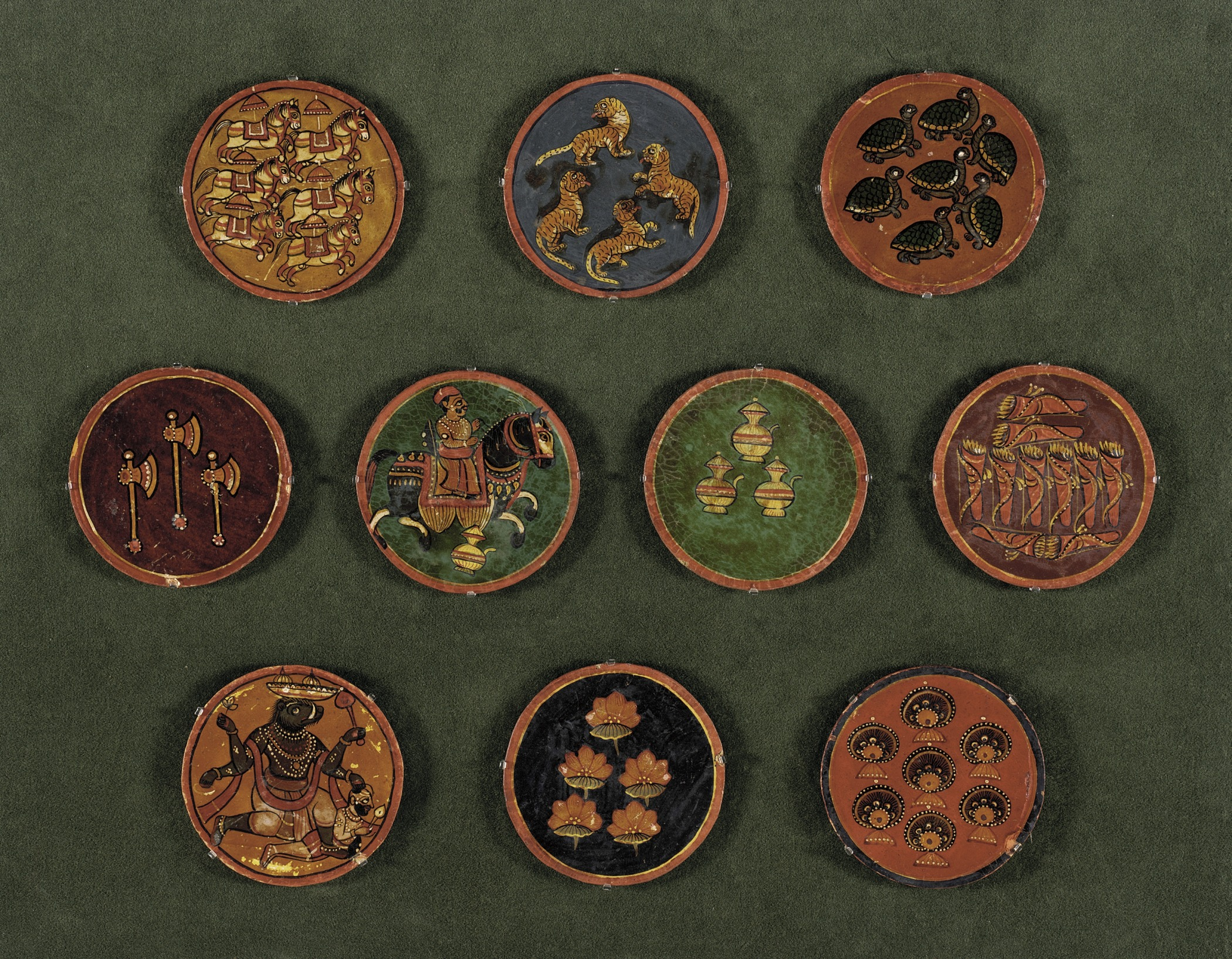
Various Ganjifa cards

The Ganjifa packs are associated with India and Persia. They are typically hand painted and many different designs are known. The suits vary in theme, and can number 4, 8, 10, 12, or more. Suits usually have 12 ranks (10 pip cards and 2 court cards), but certain decks can include more. A feature of Ganjifa cards is that they are often circular, although rectangular designs also exist. There is no set standard since the themes, suits, ranks, and even card shape may vary so widely. The form most prevalent today is Ganjapa, played in the Indian state of Odisha with the Dashavatara Ganjifa pattern being the most popular throughout India.

=== Ganjapa ===
Ganjapa are circular shaped Pattachitra painted cards. The suits are identified primarily by color, allowing the freedom for local card artists to design their own art and themes. As such, card sets are identified by the number of colors being played: "Charirangi" (4), "Atharangi" (8), "Dasarangi" (10), "Bararangi" (12), "Chaudarangi" (14), and "Sohalarangi" (16). Ganjapa suits each have ranks 1 through 10, a vizier, and a king. The Dashavatara Ganjifa pattern would be considered a Dasarangi set, as the designs are based on the 10 incarnations of Vishnu. In Odisha, this deck is normally expanded upon to include other important deities.

== Karuta ==
Portuguese trade with Japan during the mid-16th century influenced the development of karuta (Japanese: 「かるた」, Portuguese: "carta", English: "cards"). Due to restrictions on gambling, unique suit systems were developed, thus forming hanafuda and kabufuda decks. The already existing traditional Kai-awase (shell-matching) was converted to the new karuta format during the early 17th century to form E-awase karuta.

=== Standard hanafuda ===
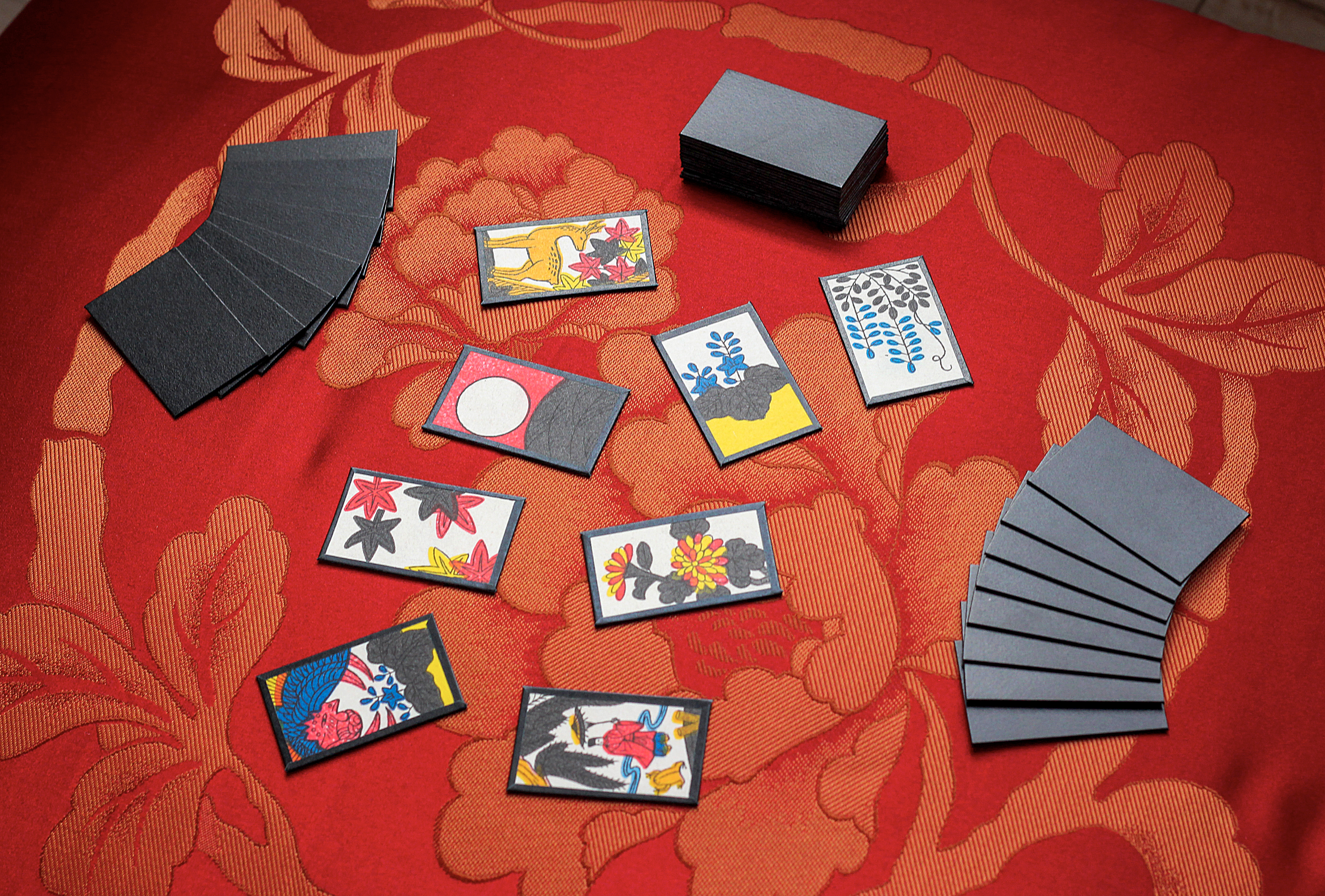
Hanafuda cards

The Japanese hanafuda pack contains 48 cards. There are 12 suits, each associated with a plant and a month of the Julian/Gregorian calendar, and four ranks: normal, poetry ribbon, tane, and bright. However, most suits have two normal cards and omit one of the other ranks. The exceptions are the November suit (which has one card of each rank, leaving only one normal card), and the December suit (which has three normal cards and one bright card). In Korea, where they are known as hwatu cards, the November and December suits are swapped.

=== Expanded hanafuda ===
Some decks include a 13th suit, which rather than being associated with a month, is labeled simply as "snow." The snow suit has one card of each rank (like the November suit), and is illustrated with bamboo as its plant.

Other decks include a different 13th suit labeled as "earth," and a 14th suit labeled as "heaven." Both of these suits have two normal cards.

=== Kabufuda ===
Kabufuda is a Japanese single-suited deck with ranks Ace, 2 through 9, and a single court card. The cards are quadruplicated to form a 40-card deck.

=== E-awase karuta ===
E-awase karuta do not feature suits nor ranks. They are used to play matching games and are divided into two sets: yomifuda (reading cards) and torifuda (grabbing cards). The sets are equal in size so that each yomifuda will have a matching torifuda. There are two major variants: Uta-garuta with 200 cards featuring poetry, and Iroha karuta with 96 cards featuring hiragana.

== Money suited ==
=== Full money-suited ===
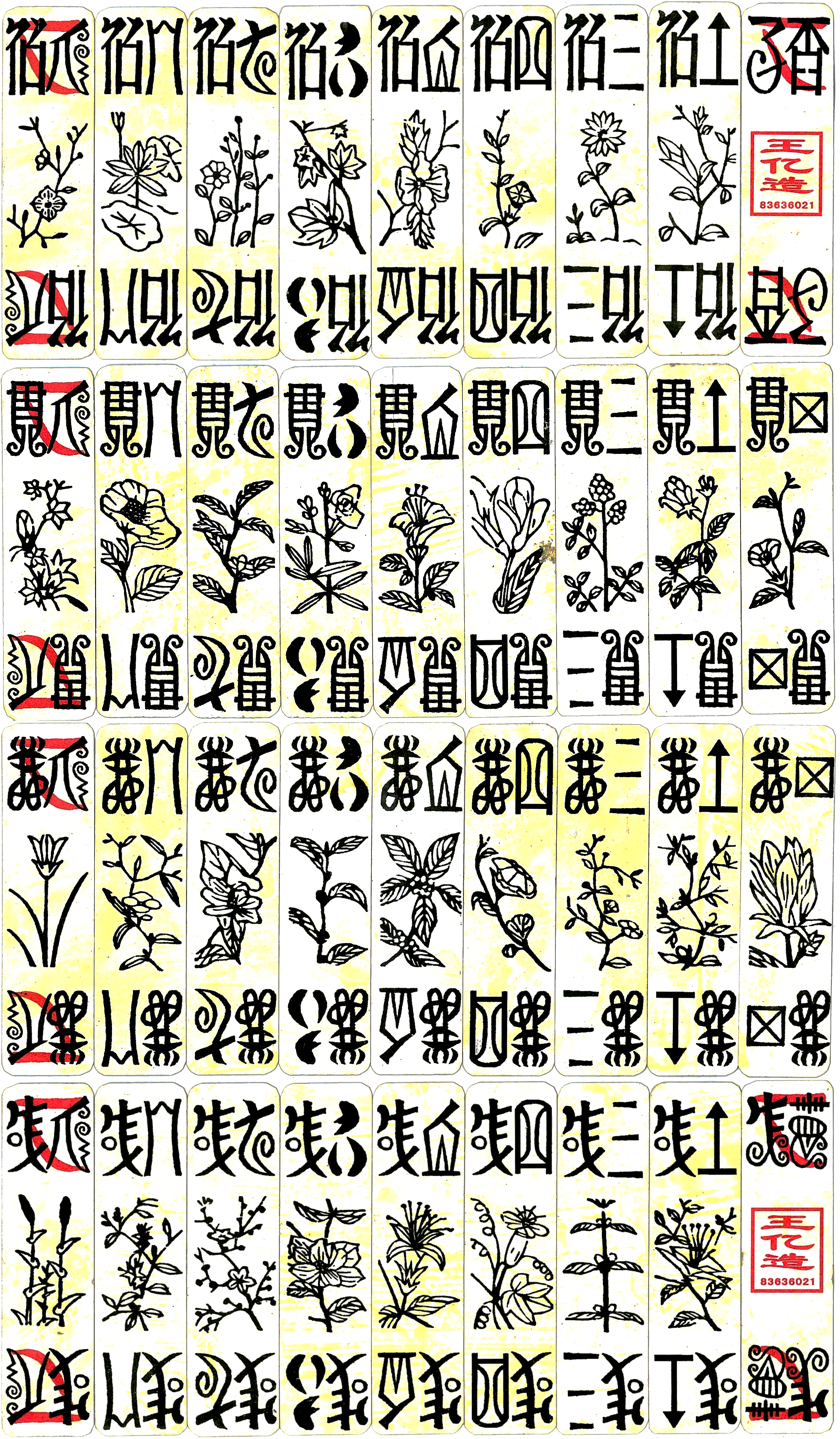
A Sichuan Six Tigers deck without special cards.

Hakka's Six Tigers decks and Vietnamese Bài bất both feature the four suits of Cash, Strings of Cash, Myriads of Strings, and Tens of Myriads. Each suit has ranks 1 through 9. There may also be up to 3 special honor cards added to this format depending on region. This makes a total of 4x9+3= 39 cards. Note that the suit and rank are solely determined by text written on the top and bottom of the cards, so that the artwork in the middle doesn't have to match.

Note that Bài bất omits the 1 of Tens of Myriad making a total of 38 cards.

=== Standard money-suited (Mahjong) ===
Mahjong sets have a different composition from playing cards, with the 144 tiles usually being divided into 3 categories:

"Suited Tiles," which constitute the majority of the pack, are divided into three suits: Circles, Bamboo, and Characters. There are nine ranks, those just being numbered 1 to 9. Each suit has four tiles of each rank, thus there are 108 suited tiles in total.

"Honor Tiles" encompasses 7 distinct tiles: East Wind, South Wind, West Wind, North Wind, Red Dragon, Green Dragon, and White Dragon. There are four of each Honor Tile, which means there are a total of 28 honor tiles.

And lastly "Flower Tiles," which is the smallest group, containing 8 tiles. The first four tiles are numbered from 1 to 4 and are associated with the Four Seasons. The last four tiles are also numbered 1 - 4, and are labeled as "The Four Gentlemen." Unlike the other groups, these tiles aren't quadruplicated, leaving only 8 tiles.

=== Mahjong regional differences ===
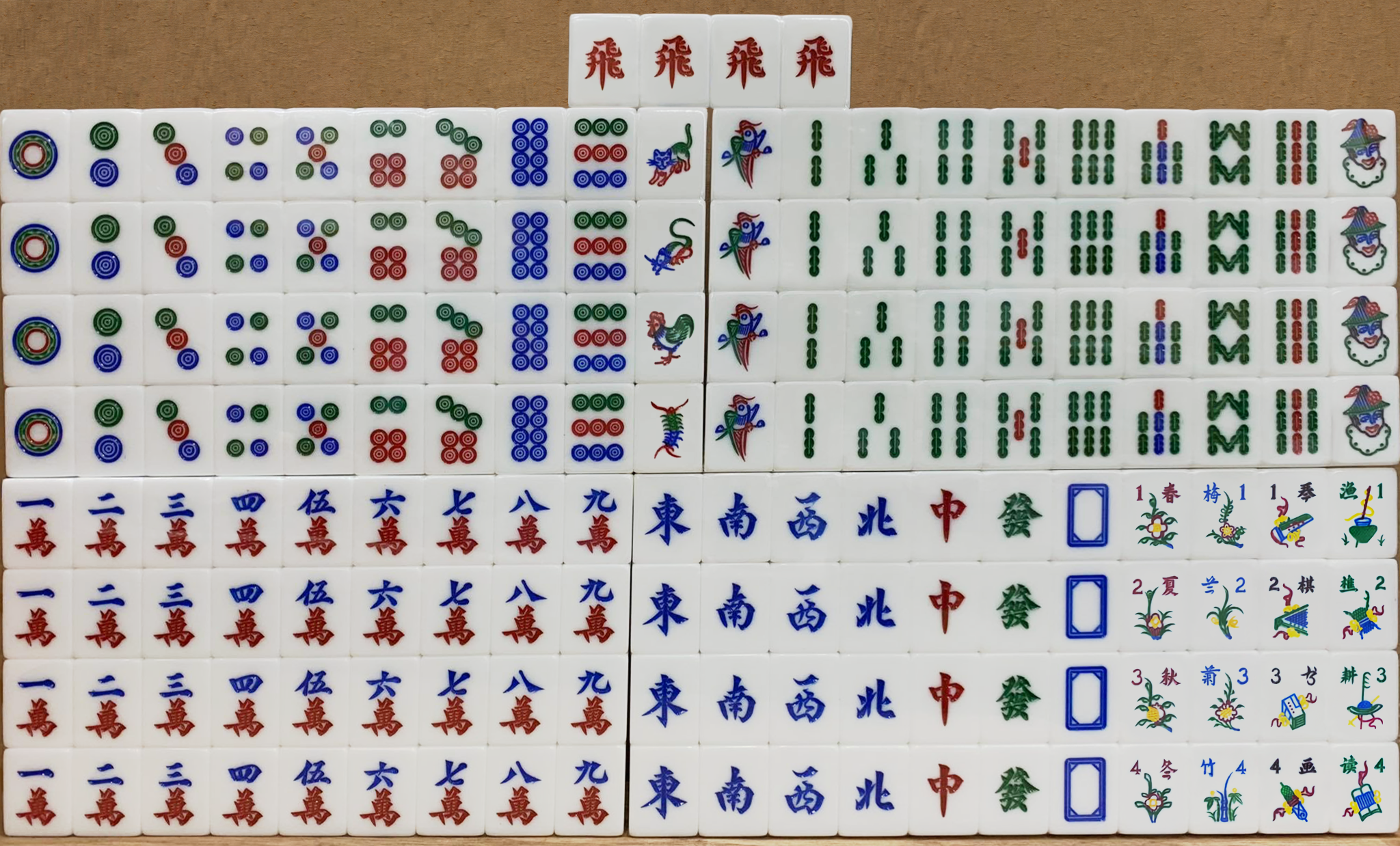
A set of Malaysian Mahjong tiles

In Japanese packs, one of the "5 Circles" tiles is special, being highlighted completely in red. Packs often also have a red "5 Bamboo" tile and a red "5 Character" tile. Certain packs also have red versions of the 1s, 3s, 7s, and 9s, although these aren't as common. Even more rarely, some packs have a red version of the White Dragon, not to be confused with the normal Red Dragon.

Malaysian packs add 8 additional Flower Tiles, known as "The Four Arts" and "The Four Noble Professions." Vietnamese sets also have additional Flower tiles, and while they occasionally use the Arts and Noble Professions, they usually instead have 8 tiles known as "The Four Emperors" and "The Four Empresses."

Malaysian and Singaporean packs add a new category called "Animal Tiles," which have pictures of Animals on them. The number and composition of these tiles vary from region to region. Certain sets also add tiles with clown faces on them, which are labeled as animal tiles, despite illustrating humans.

Various packs also contain jokers, that vary in number and purpose.

=== Stripped money-suited ===
Most money-suited decks only have three suits, dropping the Tens of Myriads suit. This results in 30 cards (3x9 plus 3 honors), although this is normally expanded upon.

=== Expanded money-suited ===
The stripped three-suit 30-card format is normally expanded upon by being doubled. This is the case for Thailand's Pai Tong (ไพ่ตอง, ‘tong cards’) (also known as Pai Phong (Thai) (ไพ่ผ่อง(ไทย)) or Pai Chot (ไพ่จอด)) and Malaysia, Singapore, and Indonesia's Ceki deck with 60 cards. Curiously most games in these regions require twice as many cards, so they are normally bought in packs of two.

The Vietnamese Bài chòi duplicates 3 existing cards in the 30-card format to make a 33-card deck. Both the Chinese Dongguan pai and the Vietnamese Tổ tôm deck quadruples the 30-card format making a 120-card deck.

== Other ==
=== European Dominoes ===
The standard European double-six domino set is composed of every combination of outcomes possible from throwing zero, one, and two six-sided dice, which there are 28 of. Each end of a tile is considered a numbered suit. Extended sets for double-nine (55 tiles), double-12 (91 tiles), double-15 (136 tiles), and double-18 (190 tiles) are also used in different regions.

=== Chinese Domino ===
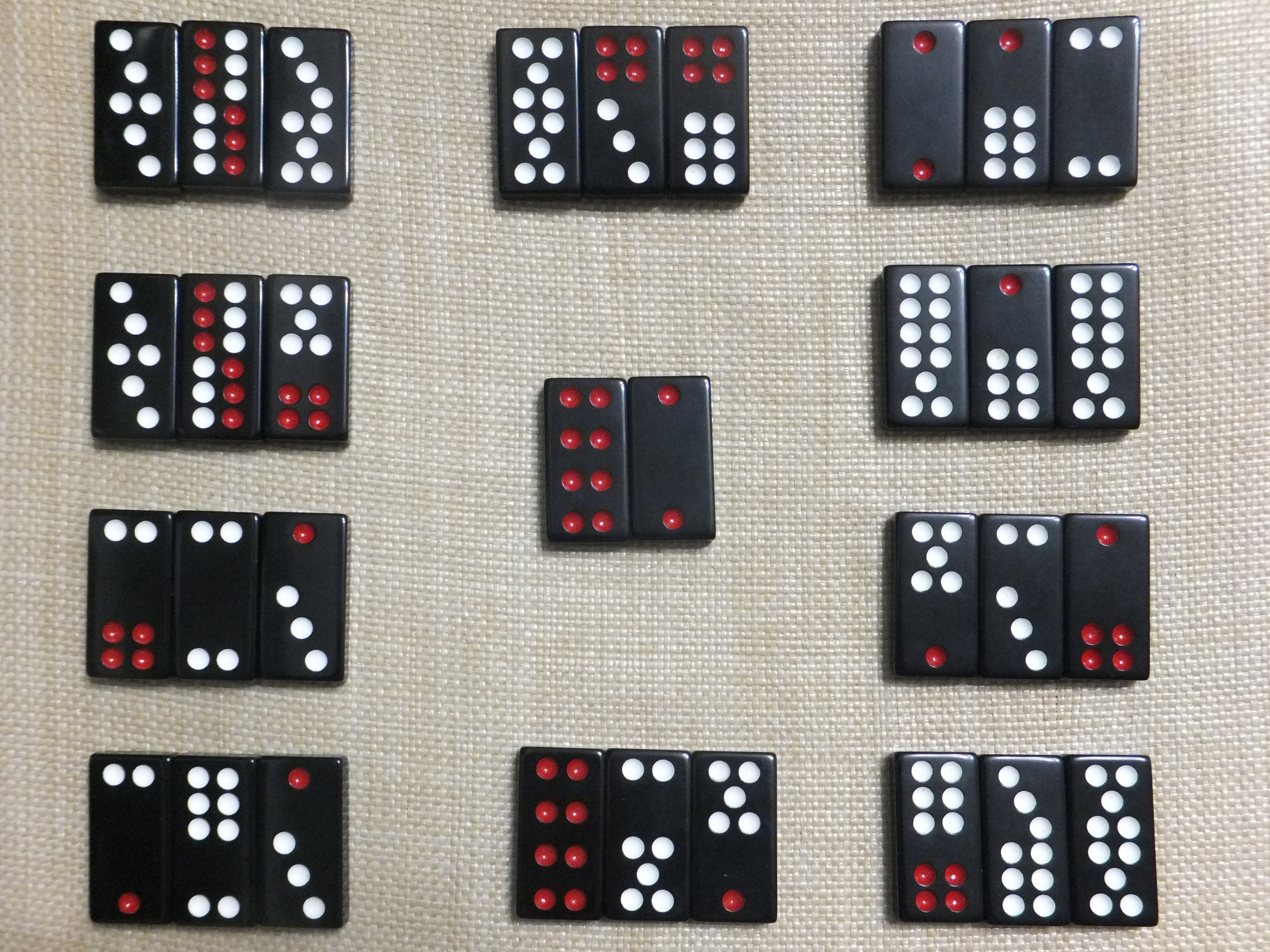
A full set of Chinese dominoes

A Chinese domino set is composed of every combination of outcomes possible from throwing two six-sided dice, which there are 21 of. These combinations are split across two suits: civil and military. Each civil tile has a unique rank, meanwhile most military tiles share a rank with another tile. The eleven civil suit tiles, from Highest to lowest are: 6-6, 1-1, 4-4, 1-3, 5-5, 3-3, 2-2, 5-6, 4-6, 1-6, 1-5. The ten military suit tiles, from highest to lowest are: 3-6 and 4-5; 2-6 and 3-5; 2-5 and 3-4; 2-4; 1-4 and 2-3; 1-2. The Civil suit is duplicated, bringing the size of the set to 32 dominoes. Note that there are variants to this standard format.

=== Khorol ===
Mongolian Khorol tiles may have derived from a double set of Chinese dominos. Most commonly, there are 60 tiles consisting of 17 ranks (in descending order): Khorol, Norov, Khas, Khangarid, Sengi, Rat, Ox, Tiger, Rabbit, Dragon, Snake, Horse, Goat, Monkey, Rooster, Dog, Pig. There are no suits, but each rank is quadruplicated except for the Dragon, Rooster, Dog and Pig which are duplicated.

=== Letter Tiles and Character Cards ===
Tiles and cards can be inscribed with a single letter or character for each tile/card. These tiles/cards can each be duplicated any number of times, at different frequencies, depending on the objective of the game set being produced.

Anagrams is a traditional word game that can be played with any set of alphabet cards or tiles. Since every language has their own orthography, there is no set standard for the game, but it is often played with tiles from another word game, such as Scrabble or Bananagrams.

Since there are over 50,000 Chinese characters, Chinese character cards normally use a much smaller subset of characters for their tiles/cards. For example, Zi pai uses number characters, Doll cards uses characters that forms a sentence, and Chinese chess cards use the characters on xiangqi pieces which have a standardized ranking system. These cards normally use color to distinguish suits and are normally duplicated (like in fishing cards) or quadruplicated (like in four color cards) to play games in the rummy family.

Japanese chess also exist in a traditional card or tile format in the form of Goita.

Numbered tiles and cards with colored suits are also popular in the Western world for games such as Rook, Uno and Rummikub, while Okey in popular in Turkey. Non-colored (i.e. single-suited) numbered cards include games in the Cuckoo family (such as Kille, Gnav, and Hexenspiel) and Kvitlech.

=== Dedicated decks ===
There are a multitude of decks designed for specific card games. Traditionally, decks made for the quartets family (like Happy families, Authors, and Go Fish) and for the match to shed family (like Black Peter and Old Maid) have been around since the late nineteenth century.
