= Ranter-Go-Round =

Traditional English card game

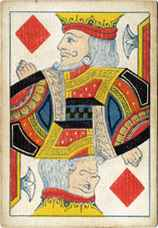
- The king is the safest card to hold
- Origin: England
- Alternative names: Chase the Ace
- Type: social game, game of chance
- Family: Shedding game
- Players: any
- Age range: 6+
- Cards: 52
- Deck: French-suited pack
- Rank (high→low): K Q J 10 9 8 7 6 5 4 3 2 A
- Play: Clockwise
- Playing time: 10 – 45 minutes

Related games
- Coucou

Ranter Go Round is a primitive, traditional, English gambling game and children's game using playing cards that also nowadays goes under the name of Chase the Ace.

In America it is usually recorded in the literature as Ranter Go Round (rarely is it hyphenated), but is also sometimes called Screw Your Neighbor which, however, is an alternative name used for at least four other quite different card games.

A similar game is known in most European countries as Cuckoo; it originated in 16th-century France and developed into the French game of Coucou. Ranter Go Round is related to the dedicated pack card or tile games of Gnav and Killekort.

== History ==
Ranter Go Round is described as early as 1881. The game "is said to have been first played in Cornwall," although its rules are almost identical to French Coucou ("Cuckoo") which itself goes back to the 15th century and there are other European games of the same family played with bespoke cards. An 1882 account describes Ranter Go Round as "a first-rate game for a winter evening." Players have three lives in the form of counters, receive one card each and exchange with their left-hand neighbours, the dealer exchanging with the stock. Players may stand i.e. refuse to exchange if they believe they have a card high enough not to lose. There are no cards with special privileges.

According to Professor Hoffmann (1891), the original method of scoring was to use a board like that in the games of merelles or nine men's morris, each player receiving one counter. "When a life was lost, the player placed his counter on the outermost line, at the point nearest to himself, and at each further loss pushed it one line nearer the centre, finally placing it therein." This effectively meant players had four lives.

In Cornwall, the three lowest cards had nicknames; the ace was "wee", the two was a "pig's toe" and the three a "tailor's yard." Refusing to exchange on account of holding a king was announced by saying "Bo".

Confusingly, at about the same time, the name Ranter Go Round appears in the literature associated with the different game of Snip, Snap, Snorem. For example, in 1879 in a publication by the English Dialect Society it is described as "an old-fashioned game of cards, marked with chalk upon a bellows or tea-tray. Now at a table, and called Miss Joan. This is followed by the lines 'Here's a card, as you may see! Here's another as good as he! Here's the best of all the three; And here's Miss Joan, come tickle me. Wee, wee!'" The same description appears in the West Cornwall Glossary of 1880.

== Rules ==
The following rules are based on Phillips and Westall (1945) except where stated.

=== Players and cards ===
Any number of players may participate. Five is usually reckoned to be the minimum and somes sources say up to 20 may play. (Note: For example, Arnold gives 5 to 20 as do Morehead, Frey and Mott-Smith.)

A standard pack of 52 cards without jokers is used. The card rankings (from highest to lowest) are K-Q-J-10-9-8-7-6-5-4-3-2-A. Suits are irrelevant. The first dealer may be chosen by dealing cards singly around the players and the first with a jack, deals.

=== Objective ===
The aim in each hand is to avoid being the holder of the lowest card, aces counting low. Each player receives three counters representing "lives". A player who loses all three lives is out. The winner is the last player left in. (Note: If played for money, stakes may be used instead or players may ante to the pot at the outset.)

=== Deal and play ===
Each player is dealt one card, face down, after which play begins with eldest hand, to the left of the dealer. Holding a king, eldest faces it on the table otherwise decides whether to keep it, by saying "stand", or exchange it with the player on the left. (Note: Several sources say that an exchange is announced by saying "change" e.g. Morehead, Frey and Mott-Smith, Culbertson and Arnold.) The following players have the same options. (Note: Several sources say the player announces "King" on being challenged e.g. Arnold.) If a player has a king, the exchange is rejected and the player to the left of the one with the king must decide to keep or exchange a card. Play proceeds clockwise around the table, with the dealer going last; instead of exchanging cards with someone else, though, the dealer may exchange by cutting a card from the stock.

Some rules state that, if a king is cut from the stock, the dealer alone loses a life.

After all players have taken a turn, they turn their cards face up and the one with the lowest card loses a life by paying a counter into the pot. If two or more players tie for lowest card, they each lose a life. (Note: For example, see Culbertson.)

The dealer rotates clockwise for each new hand. A player who loses all 3 counters is out of the game; the last player left in wins and sweeps the pot.

John McLeod is the only source to consider the case where the last two players both lose their final counters in a tie and gives several options which must be pre-agreed:

- They are joint winners and split the pot.
- They play a decider.
- They cut and the highest card wins.
- The pot is carried forward to the next game.

== Variations ==
Typical variations include:

- A common rule is that a player forced to exchange an Ace, 2 or 3, announces or faces it, so that all know where it is.
- When exchanging the dealer takes the top card of the stock instead of cutting it. (Note: This is the original rule in Cassell's. In all other sources the dealer cuts the stock.)
- When exchanging with the stock, the dealer is not penalised for drawing a King.

McLeod records further variations in an American version of Screw Your Neighbor in which up to 26 players start with four lives in the guise of 4 stakes. The last in wins all the stakes. Kings may be treated differently as follows:

- King Trading - kings must be exchanged if demanded
- King Stops Hand - anyone dealt a king faces it, the hand is not played but the lowest card loses a life.
- King Stops Play - anyone dealt a king faces it on being asked to exchange or when the turn comes round. Play stops, everyone turns their cards and the loser is the one with the lowest

== Bibliography ==
- _ (1879). Specimens of English Dialects. English Dialect Society.
- _ (1881). Cassell's Book of In-Door Amusements, Card Games and Fireside Fun. Cassell.
- _ (1882). Cassell's Book of Sports and Pastimes. London, Paris and New York: Cassell, Petter, Galpin.
- Arnold, Peter (2009). Chambers Card Games for Families. Edinburgh: Chambers Harrap.
- Courtney, Margaret Ann (1880). West Cornwall Glossary. London: Trübner.
- Culbertson, Ely (1957). Culbertson's Card Games Complete. Arco.
- Morehead, Albert H, Richard L. Frey and Geoffrey Mott-Smith (1991). The New Complete Hoyle Revised, rev. by Richard L. Frey, Tom Smith, Phillip Alder and Matt Klam. London, New York, Toronto, Sydney and Auckland: Doubleday. ISBN 0-385-24962-4
- Parlett, David (2008). The Penguin Book of Card Games. London: Penguin. ISBN 978-0-141-03787-5
- Phillips, Hubert and Westall B.C. (1939, reprinted 1945). The Complete Book of Card Games. London: Witherby.
