= Hère =

Hère is French and may refer to:

- Hère (card game), a French card game and predecessor of Coucou
- Hère (wine grape), a variety of wine grape usually known as Gros Verdot
