= Dedicated deck card game =

Modern game with a unique set of cards and no board

A dedicated deck card game is one played with a deck specific to that game, rather than a pack of standard playing cards. Educational packs of cards were being printed by the late eighteenth century, initially designed merely to inform, but later becoming playable games. Modern card games are often sold with non-standard distributions of suits and ranks.

== Unranked cards ==
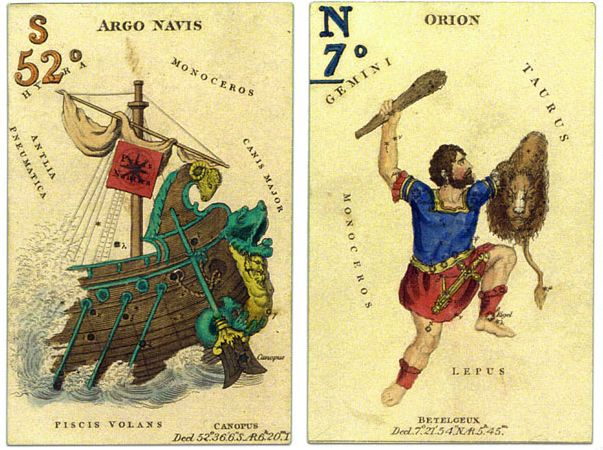
Cards from Astrophilogeon depicting the constellations of Argo Navis and Orion

By the late eighteenth century, educational packs of cards were being printed without suits or ranks, such as The Elements of Astronomy and Geography Explained, published by John Wallis in 1795. These served as teaching aids rather than being playable games. Charles Hodges' 1828 game Astrophilogeon was a deck of 60 cards showing 30 constellations and 30 terrestrial maps, with which players could play a game attempting to obtain corresponding pairs.

An early 20th century dedicated deck card game was Touring, published in 1906, and inspiring Mille Bornes in 1954.

Play typically bears some resemblance to traditional card games of the Eights family including Mau Mau from which Uno may have been developed, as well as games of the Cuccu family, such as Kille in which there are no suits, but certain cards have artwork and names that determine their effect.

Modern dedicated deck card games such as Dominion and Munchkin use neither suits nor ranks, instead having text and artwork which describes their effect in the game.

== Suits and ranks ==
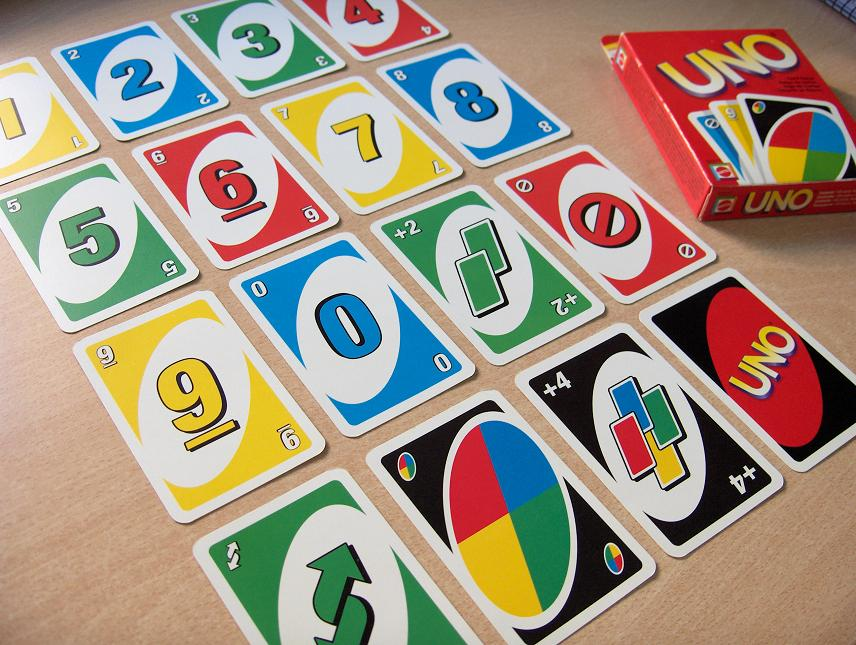
The game of Uno is designed to be played with a dedicated deck of cards

Some dedicated deck card games use the suit system of traditional playing cards, having a variety of suits, each containing a number of numbered or named ranks. Some ranks may have particular effects, like the numberless "skip a turn" cards in Uno, and the deck may contain additional suitless cards, echoing the jokers of traditional card games.

The French card game Gnav and its variants use a deck of two suits, each suit containing the numbers zero through 12 and a number of creatures and objects (such as the "Owl" and the "Pot"). The deck can only be used to play the game it is designed for.

The 1906 card game Rook was designed with coloured suits and an absence of face cards, to cater for Puritan and Mennonite players who disapproved of face cards and their association with gambling and cartomancy.

Modern commercial card games which use suits and ranks are typically designed to be played with dedicated decks, giving the player a reason to buy a physical copy rather than learning to play the game with regular playing cards. The game of Uno, for example, is very similar to the traditional card game Mau-Mau, but uses custom iconography which would be harder to remember when using regular playing cards. The game of Haggis has similar mechanics to several traditional card games, but features an extra suit, making it impossible to play with a regular deck.

== See also ==
- Collectible card game
- Deck-building game
- Expandable card game
- List of dedicated deck card games
- Stripped deck, a standard deck with some cards removed
