= Cuccù =

Italian card game

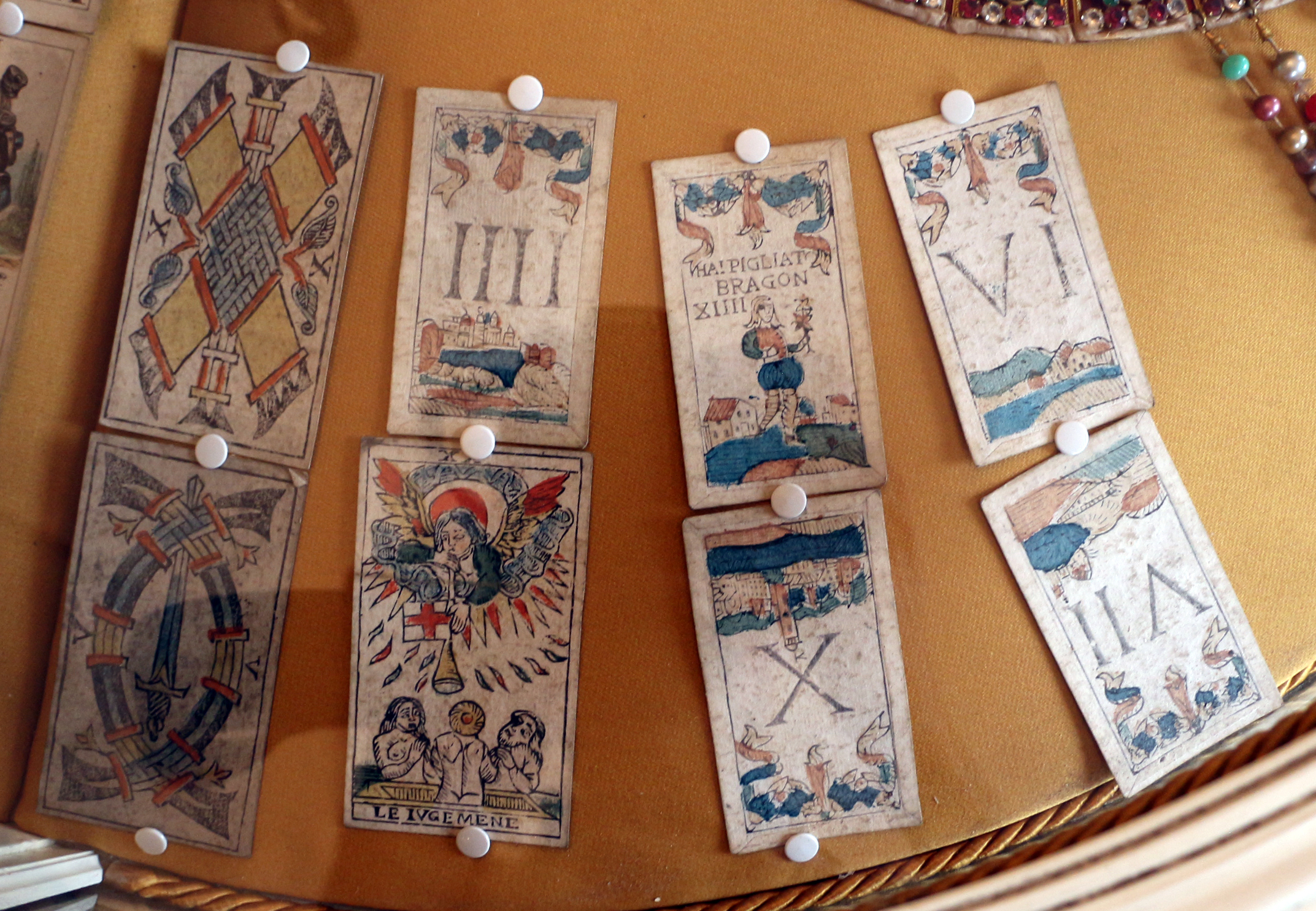
- Cuccù cards
- Origin: Italy
- Alternative names: Cucù
- Type: social game, game of chance
- Family: Cuckoo group
- Players: 2 – 20
- Cards: 40
- Deck: Special Cuccù pack
- Rank (high→low): XV – I, 0, Pail, Mask, Lion, Fool
- Play: Anticlockwise

Related games
- Coucou

Cuccù or Cucù ("Cuckoo") is an Italian card game, over 300 years old, that is playable by two to twenty players and which uses a special pack of 40 cards. It is a comparing game in which there is only one winner, and is unusual in that each player only receives one card.

== History ==
The origins of Cuccù lie in the French card game of Mécontent (Malcontent) whose first references date to the early 16th century. The game, which is still played today, was also known as Hère but eventually the name Coucou ("Cuckoo") prevailed.

The game migrated to Italy, where the earliest mention of "Malcontento" dates to 1547, (Note: "Capriccio in laude del Malcontento" by Luigi Tansillo of Naples.) but it was in the early 18th century that the first dedicated decks for what became known as Cuccù (Cuccù, Cucco, Cucu' or Stu) appeared; the pack consisting of 38 cards. These special Cuccù packs are the earliest surviving examples of a family of non-suited packs, sometimes referred to as the Cambio family. They originally had 38 cards divided into two more-or-less identical sets of cards, each set comprising eleven numeral cards, with Roman numerals from 0 (low) to X (high), and eight picture cards, the lion of the modern pack being the missing card.

The oldest known rules were published the Al Mondo company and date to 1717. These were included in the pack of cards produced in Bologna by Giulio Borzaghi. On the title card of another pack, the cards were described as a new game with the Fool. As in the original card game, suits do not matter but rank is very important. Compared with a full 52-card pack, the new one reduced the number of cards but added more ranks to produce two identical sequences of 18 cards. The most unusual feature of the new pack was the inclusion of cards depicting a Fool which were not ranked within the sequence. perhaps inspired by the Fool in Italian Tarot card games. The game was also known to be played with wooden pieces in Venice during the late 18th-century, possibly as a way of avoiding the stamp tax.

Cuccù was popular among sailors and mercenaries in the eighteenth century, allowing the game to spread to other parts of Europe and several local variants arose. As it migrated north, the number of cards and the name of the game changed. In Germany, Bavaria, and Austria, for example, it became Hexenspiel ("Witch") or Vogelspiel ("Bird"). The game had reached Denmark-Norway as Gniao, later Gnav, by the 18th century and another ban on gambling card games led to it following the Italian example and being reinvented as a game with pieces. The game also reached the Netherlands, as Slabberjan, and Sweden, as Cambio (Italian for "exchange") and, later, Kille.

By 1824, a trick-taking game played with Cuccù cards had emerged in Lombardy, which regarded the pack as comprising two suits – numerals and 'figures' (picture cards) – there being a requirement to follow suit. Today, the only cardmaker of Cuccù cards is Masenghini, whose pack comes with a set of instructions in Italian for the usual comparing game.

In modern Italy, the game is played with original rules only in the small Abruzzi towns of Campli and Montorio al Vomano, both in the Teramo province. The same cards are also used in Brescia and Bergamo provinces but with different rules from the original.

== Cards ==
There are 40 cards in a modern Cuccù pack which rank in descending order as follows:

Card names and actions in Cuccù
Card name	Italian	Action on being challenged
Cuckoo	Cucco (XV)	Holder says "Cuckoo!" and no exchange takes place
Hunter (XIIII) (Note: Inscription: Hai pigliato bragon.)	Bum, Tuff (Note: Bum and Tuff mean "bang", simulating the hunter's gun.)	Holder says "Bang!", no exchange takes place and the exchanger loses a counter
Horse (XIII)	Salta, Cavallo (Note: Inscription: Salta, a horse rampant.)	Holder neighs and exchanger must try and swap with the next in line
Cat (XII)	Gnaf (Note: Inscription: Gnao.)	Holder miaows; exchanger loses a counter. Earlier exchanges may be reversed
Tavern (XI)	Taverna (Note: Inscription: Fermatevi alquanto.)	Holder says "Will you stay a while?" Exchanger may try to encourage a swap
I – X	I – X	Cards exchanged
Nulla	Nulla	Cards exchanged
Pail (Note: Inscription: Secchia meno di nulla.)	Secchio	Cards exchanged
Mask (Note: Inscription: Mascherone manco di secchia.)	Maschera	Cards exchanged
Lion (Note: No inscription, a lion rampant added in the early 19th-century.)	Leone	Cards exchanged
The Fool (Note: The Fool has no fixed place in the sequence.)	Matto	Depends on situation

== Rules ==
The following rules are based on pagat.com.

Players pay a stake to the pool and receive 3 counters each. Having drawn cards, the player with the highest becomes the first dealer. The dealer shuffles and has the pack cut by the player to the left before dealing one card each in anticlockwise order. Cards are dealt from the bottom of the pack. As each card is dealt, the dealer pauses while the player decides whether to keep the card by saying "fine" (sto bene) or exchange it by saying "pass" (passo). If the player opts to exchange the card with the next player to the right (the 'holder' of the wanted card), the dealer deals the holder a card and, if it is a ten (X) or lower, the exchange goes ahead. If the holder gets a card ranking from XI to XV, the following actions occur:

- XV - holder shows the Cuckoo and the exchange does not go ahead.
- XIIII - holder shows the Hunter and mimes shooting at the exchanger. The exchange does not go ahead and the exchanger loses a counter.
- XIII - holder shows the Horse and neighs or makes a galloping sound. The exchanger must now try to exchange with the next player in line. If the holder is the dealer, the exchanger takes the top card of the stock.
- XII - holder shows the Cat and miaows. The exchanger loses a counter and, if the exchanger received a card as an exchange, all the exchanges to date are reversed.
- XI - holder shows the Tavern and says "will you stay a while?". The exchanger may forgo the exchange or say "will you pay if I have nothing?" If the innkeeper refuses, the exchange goes ahead; if he agrees, both keep their cards and if the exchanger has the Zero and it loses, the innkeeper pays a counter instead of the guest.

Talking and bluffing are allowed.

Once all have had a chance to exchange, the players expose their cards and the lowest one loses a counter. If players tie, each loses a counter. If one player has the Fool it is equal to the lowest card other card in play (unless the lowest is a Cuckoo), so both the holder of the Fool and the player(s) with the lowest cards lose counters. If two players have Fools, they rank as the second highest cards. A player with no counters left drops out; if this happens during play, their card is not involved in deciding the loser of the hand.

The last player left in is the winner and sweeps the pool.

== Bibliography ==
- Pratesi, Franco (1990). "Italian Cards – New Discoveries: 13 – Cards and Men for Cucù" in The Playing-Card, Vol. 19, No. 2 (November 1990), pp. 68–76.
- Smith, A. G. (1991). "The 'Cambio' Packs and the Games Played with Them. I. Hexenspiel and Quittli" in The Playing-Card, Vol. XIX, No. 3 (February 1991), pp. 93ff.
- Smith, A. G. (1992). "The 'Cambio' Packs and the Games Played with Them. III. Cuccu" in The Playing-Card, Vol. XX, No. 1 (August 1991), pp. 22–28.
