= Femkortskille =

19th century Swedish card game

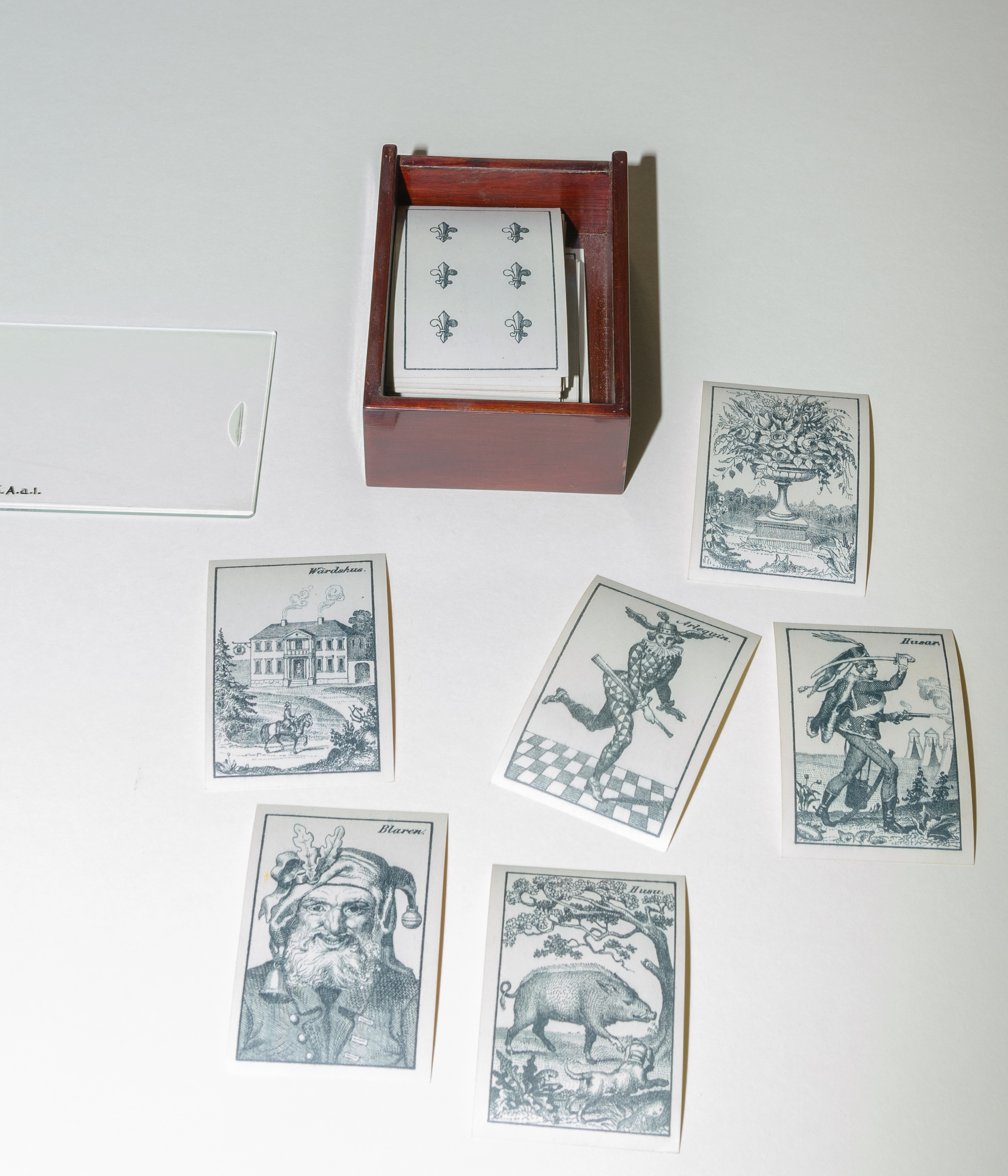
- Kille cards manufactured in 1897 in Stockholm by A Boman. From the collection of the Hallwyl Museum
- Origin: Sweden
- Players: 3+
- Cards: 42 cards
- Deck: Kille cards

Femkortskille ("Five-Card Kille"), also called Knackkille ("Knock Kille") or Bultkille ("Peg Kille"), is a Swedish card game that is played with a Kille pack. The game originated in the middle of the 19th century by transferring the principles of the game of Femkort ("Five Cards") to a game played with Kille playing cards. Like Kille, Femkortskille is traditionally played for money.

== Rules ==
Deal and play are clockwise. The game starts with each player anteing a stake to the pot. Next the players receive three cards each and, in turn, decide to "knock", "pass" or "check". Knocking (either by knocking on the table or saying "I knock") means that a player wants to play for the pot. A player who passes throws in their hand and drops out of the current deal. A player may only check if no other player so far has knocked. It means that the player will decide later whether to knock or pass.

Those who knocked get two more cards each and then play the cards to tricks. Players must head the trick if able. If two equally high cards are played, the second one beats the first. The cards have the same ranking as in a One-Card Kille (Enkortskille), with the difference that the Kille (Harlequin) is always the highest card.

Eldest leads to the first trick, and the winner of each trick leads to the next. The player who wins the fifth and final trick also wins the deal. All the players who knocked but lost must pay as much to the pot as it contained at the end of the deal, and after that the winner collects the entire pot including the payment of the losers.

== Variations ==
Femkortskille is sometimes played with the rule that a "shit hand" (skituppslag)—i.e. a hand with at least three of the three lowest cards—wins the pot immediately. In some circles, the rule is that the players who knock must add another stake to the pot. Another rule is that the payment to the pot made by the losing players is not collected by the winner, but remains in the pot until the next deal.

== Variants ==
- Auction Kille (Auktionskille). In Auction Kille, players are not allowed to check. If you want to stay in the game, you must make a bet that is at least as large as the previous bet.
- Poker Kille (Pokerkille) has a more complex betting procedure and players may also exchange cards with the stock.

== See also ==
- Enkortskille
- Krypkille

== Bibliography ==
- Glimne, Dan (2016). Kortspelshandboken (3rd, expanded ed.). Stockholm: Känguru. pp. 419–421, 424–426. ISBN 978-91-7663-115-7.
- Torgny, Ove (2003). Tio spel med spader kung. Stockholm: Bilda. p. 100. ISBN 91-574-7484-2.
- Schenkmanis, Ulf (1988). Kortspel & patienser. Västerås: ICA. pp. 155, 159–161, 163–164. ISBN 91-534-1178-1.
- Werner, Einar; Sandgren, Tore (1975). Kortoxen (9th, rev. ed.). Stockholm: Forum. pp. 109–111. ISBN 91-37-05798-7.
