= Clue Quest =

Card game

Clue Quest is a card game published in 1987 by Edufun Games.

== Contents ==
Clue Quest is a game in which three to six players are dealt a hand of nine cards from which they attempt to make a word.

== Reception ==
Derek Carver reviewed Clue Quest for Games International magazine, and gave it 3 stars out of 5, and stated that "We all enjoyed the playtest well enough with one member keen to continue after the agreed number of rounds. I would give it a couple of stars but the player who was more enthusiastic than I would, I am sure, give it four. I'll compromise at three."
