= The Make My Day Card Game =

Card game

The Make My Day Card Game (also known as MMDCG) is a 1987 card game designed by William Hollifield. The game has some similarities to Gin Rummy and takes about an hour to play.

== Publication history ==
The Make My Day Card Game is a card game in which each player is a world leader competing against the others for power.

== Reception ==
Stewart Wieck reviewed The Make My Day Card Game in the December 1988 issue of White Wolf Magazine noting that, "while it is not particularly strategy-dominated or mind-arresting, MMDCG is fun and could be a good choice for the political minded, or those who simply enjoy a good card game".
