= Gnav =

Scandinavian card game

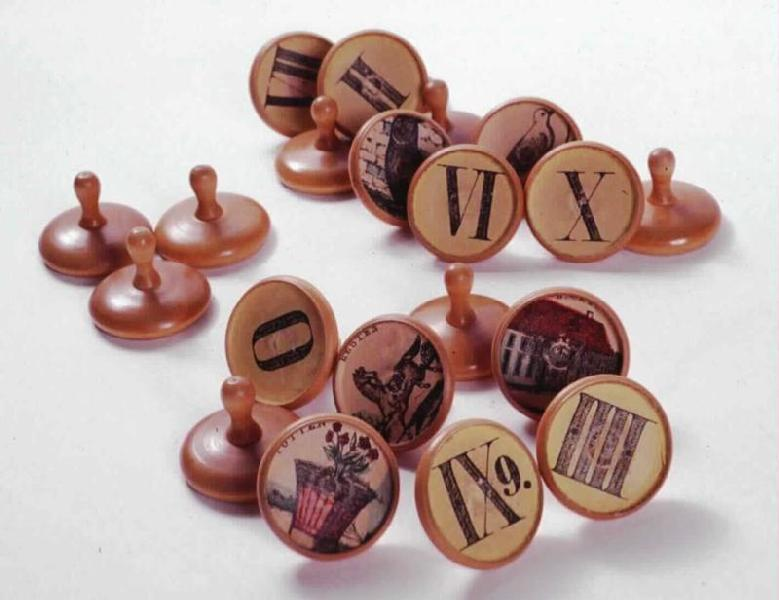
Gnav pieces.

Gnav is a traditional Danish and Norwegian social game that has been played with either special cards or wooden pieces with similar motifs. Gnav packs appeared after 1820 and the game was popular until c. 1920. The game can be played by 20 or more players, and a minimum of two. Today, only the playing card version is available in Norway.

Gnav descends from the 18th century Italian card game of Cuccù, played with bespoke packs, which, in turn is based on a much older French game called Mécontent, the precursor to Coucou.

== History ==
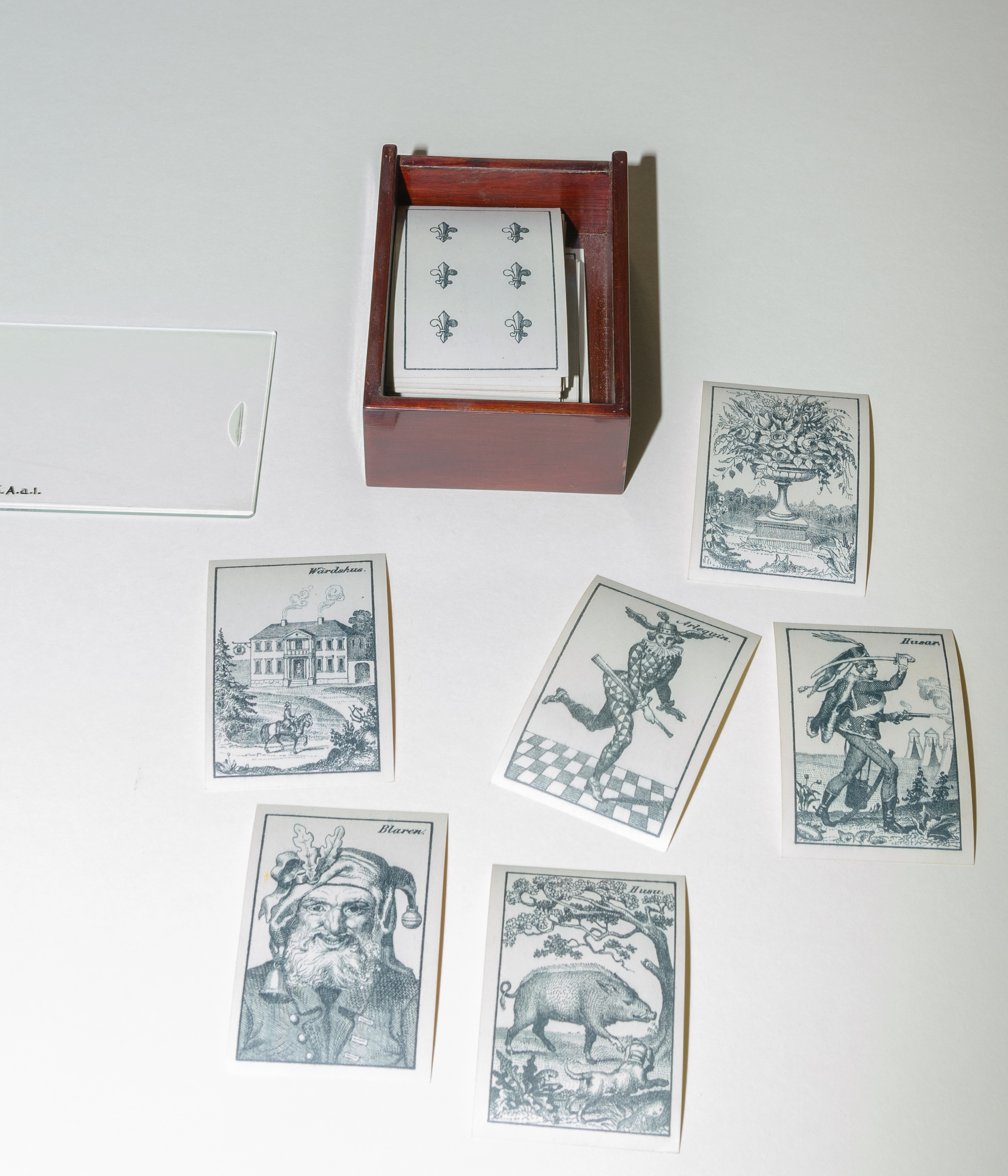
Swedish Kille deck from 1897.

The origins of Gnav lie in the French children's card game of Mécontent (Malcontent i.e. "unhappy") whose first references date to the early 16th century. (Note: The game was also known as Hère but eventually the name Coucou ("Cuckoo") prevailed. Coucou is still played in France today.) This game had migrated to Italy by the mid-16th century where it was named "Malcontento" (Note: "Capriccio in laude del Malcontento" by Luigi Tansillo of Naples.) but it was in the early 18th century that the first dedicated decks for what became known as Cuccù (Cuckoo) appeared; the pack consisting of 38 cards. As in the original game, suits were irrelevant but rank was important. The new pack consisted of two identical sequences of 19 cards each, including a Fool. The game was also known to be played with wooden pieces in Venice during the late 18th century, possibly as a way of avoiding the stamp tax.

Since the game was popular among sailors and mercenaries in the eighteenth century, it spread rapidly to other parts of Europe, changing its name and generating local variations in the number of cards or images portrayed. By the time it had reached Denmark as Gniao (Italian for miaow), it had 42 cards; the earliest packs being produced by Jacob Holmblad in the 1820s or 1830s. The game became known as Gnav when the game was taken to Norway by Danish officials in the days when the two countries were united as Denmark-Norway. At that time it was played with both cards and men (playing pieces resembling chess pawns). The latter probably originated under Christian VI (1730–1746), the Pietist king, during whose reign a ban on card games was introduced to lessen the misery of reckless gambling, but the game's popularity among commoners meant that it was given a new life as a game with pieces, the images being glued to the base so they could not be seen when stood up. The men were usually kept in a leather bag. Since it was no longer a card game, it was even allowed to be played on Sundays and over Christmas. As a result, it changed from a gambling game to a children's game during the 19th century and it is still seen as a game for the Christmas season today. In Norway, both the card game and variant using pieces are still played. Gnav was also taken to the Netherlands where it became known as Slabberjan.

The game is first mentioned in Sweden in 1741, as Cambio (Italian for "exchange"), also called Campio, Camphio, Camfio or Kamfio. In 1833 this became Kille (probably a distortion of "Harlequin", given the special rules for that card in the Swedish version of the game), which became the common form of the game around 1850.

In 1979, a new Gnav pack, designed by Astrid Pilegaard Larsen, was produced to coincide with a games exhibition, with the intention of rescuing the game from obscurity. Gnav packs are still available in Norway today.

== Equipment ==
The wooden pieces, in the piece version of the game, resemble the pawns in chess, with the identity of the piece being written on the base and thus invisible during play. In the card version of the game, the pack comprises 42 cards consisting of two sets of 21 distinct cards ranking, from highest to lowest, as follows:

Card names and actions in Gnav
Card/piece name	Danish/ Norwegian	Action on being challenged
Cuckoo	Gøgen/Gjöken (Note: Intentionally, old-fashioned spelling of Gjøken (in (Bokmål) or Gauken (in Nynorsk).)	Holder says "Stop, Cuckoo!" and the round ends
Dragoon	Dragonen	Holder says "Chop!", exchanger pays a counter
Cat	Katten	Holder says "Miaow", the exchanger pays a counter and all swaps are reversed
Horse	Hesten	Holder says "Pass the horse!" and exchanger challenges the next in line
House	Huset	Holder says "Pass the house!" and exchanger challenges the next in line
I – XII or 1 – 12	1 – 12	Cards exchanged
0	0	Cards exchanged
Flowerpot	Potten	Cards exchanged
Owl	Uglen	Cards exchanged
The Fool	Narren	Cards exchanged

== Rules ==
Each player receives a single card (or take a wooden piece from a bag) at random, and examines its value. If a player is dealt the Fool, they must knock the table to alert other players to this fact. Players also receive equal supplies of counters. Play then proceeds by turns, starting to the left of the dealer. In turn, a player may either choose to keep the card dealt, by saying "stand" ("jeg står"), or swap it with the left-hand neighbour by saying "change" ("jeg byte"). Play continues until reaching the dealer, who has the choice of keeping the card dealt or exchanging it with the top card of the stock, drawing another card if a Horse or House is drawn. The dealer's turn ends the round.

If a player attempts to swap the card held with one of the five highest cards in the pack (picture cards known as matador), the exchange is prevented and another action ensues, depending on the matador held by the opponent:

- Cuckoo: its holder says "Cuckoo!" or "Stop! Cuckoo!" and the round ends immediately.
- Dragoon: its holder says "Chop!" ("hugg av"), and the player who tried to swap cards must pay a counter to the pool. Play then proceeds with the player to the holder's left.
- Cat: its holder says "Miaow!" or hisses like a cat and says "Change back!" ("kiss, bytt om"), the challenger pays a counter to the pool, and the game is reset so that every player has the card they started with.
- Horse or House: its holder says "Pass the horse!" ("hest vorbi") or "Pass the house!" ("hus vorbi"), and the exchanger must now swap with the player to the left of the holder (or with the top card of the deck, if the holder is also the dealer).

When the round ends, all the players reveal their cards and the one with the lowest loses the round. If two tie, they both lose. If the lowest card was the Fool, then both its holder and the player with the next lowest card lose. A losing player pays one counter to the pool and is eliminated if they have no counters left. The last player remaining is the winner.

Instead of using counters, players may keep score using a chalk and slate. Players receive strokes (////) on the slate instead of paying counters to the pool and a player is eliminated on scoring an agreed number of strokes.

== Related games ==
=== Hypp ===
Hypp packs were made in Norway until the 1980s and the game is known as early as 1859 in Denmark (as Hyp). They were the same as Gnav packs but consisted of only 1 set of the 21 distinct cards. One set of rules accompanying the cards switches the order of the Owl and the Fool. The cards were formerly single-ended, but the most recent packs by Saga Kunstforlag were double-ended.

Hypp is a game of chance in which cards are dealt in 'heaps' (hence the name) and players bet on the cards at the bottom of each heap. It appears related to the French game of Petits Paquets, the game of Bankafalet described by Charles Cotton in 1674 and the old Czech game of Hromadky which is known as far back as 1609.

=== Slabberjan ===
Similar to Gnav but with a different ranking (highest to lowest): Cavalier (Kap-af) > Bird (Vogel) > Cat (Poesje) > Tavern (Herberge) > Numerals 12 to 1 > 0 (zero) > Blank (Blind, a blank card) > Pot (Pot) > Mask (Smoel) > Fool (Nar).

=== Kille ===
The deck comprises 42 cards of a single suit, comprising two copies of 21 distinct cards, in the ranking (highest to lowest):

Card names and actions in Kille
Card name	Swedish	Action on being challenged
Cuckoo	Kuku	Holder says "Cuckoo stands!", the round ends and all reveal their cards
Hussar	Husar	Holder says "Hussar strikes!", the exchanger is out
Pig	Husu, Gris	Holder says "The pig bites back!", there is no swap and all the earlier swaps are reversed
Cavalier	Kavall	Holder says "Pass the cavalier!" and exchanger challenges the next in line
Inn or Tavern	Värdshus	Holder says "Pass the tavern!" and exchanger challenges the next in line
1 – 12	1 – 12	Cards exchanged
Wreath	Kransen	Cards exchanged
Flowerpot	Blompotten	Cards exchanged
Mask	Blaren	Cards exchanged
Harlequin	Harlekin	Depends on situation

=== Cuccù ===
The modern deck comprises 40 cards, comprising two copies of 20 distinct cards, in the ranking (highest to lowest):

Card names and actions in Cuccù
Card name	Italian	Action on being challenged
Cuckoo	Cucco (XV)	Holder says "Cuckoo!" and no exchange takes place
Hunter (XIIII) (Note: Inscription: Hai pigliato bragon.)	Bum, Tuff (Note: Bum and Tuff mean "bang", simulating the hunter's gun.)	Holder says "Bang!", no exchange takes place and the exchanger loses a counter
Horse (XIII)	Salta, Cavallo (Note: Inscription: Salta, a horse rampant.)	Holder neighs and exchanger must try and swap with the next in line
Cat (XII)	Gnaf (Note: Inscription: Gnao.)	Holder miaows; exchanger loses a counter. Earlier exchanges may be reversed
Tavern (XI)	Taverna (Note: Inscription: Fermatevi alquanto.)	Holder says "Will you stay a while?" Exchanger may try to encourage a swap
I – X	I – X	Cards exchanged
Nulla	Nulla	Cards exchanged
Pail (Note: Inscription: Secchia meno di nulla.)	Secchio	Cards exchanged
Mask (Note: Inscription: Mascherone manco di secchia.)	Maschera	Cards exchanged
Lion (Note: No inscription, a lion rampant added in the early 19th-century.)	Leone	Cards exchanged
The Fool (Note: The Fool has no fixed place in the sequence.)	Matto	Depends on situation

In modern Italy, the game is played with original rules only in the small Abruzzi towns of Campli and Montorio al Vomano, both in the Teramo province. The same cards are also used in Brescia and Bergamo provinces but for a completely different, trick-taking game.

=== Vogelspiel or Hexenspiel ===
The pack comprises 32 cards with 10 pairs of non-identical picture cards but only one set of 12 numeral cards. They rank from highest to lowest as follows:

Card names and actions in Hexenspiel or Vogelspiel
Card name	Austrian/Bavarian	Action on being challenged
Bird	Pfeiff	No exchange takes place and the exchanger loses two of three lives
Guard	Werda	No exchange takes place and the exchanger loses a life
Cat	Miau	No exchange takes place and the exchanger loses a life
Horse	Hott	No exchange takes place and the exchanger loses a life
Tavern	Einkerth	No exchange takes place and the exchanger loses a life
I – X	I – X	Cards exchanged. Note: some packs have XI and XII instead of two Nullas.
Nulla	Nulla	Cards exchanged. Note: some packs have XI and XII instead of two Nullas.
Plate	Deller, Teller	Cards exchanged
Sausages	Wurst	Cards exchanged
Glass	Glas	Cards exchanged
The Fool	Narr	Cards exchanged
Witch	Hex	Cards exchanged

== Bibliography ==
- Bauer, Günther G.: "Das Salzburger Hexenspiel", in: Homo Ludens. Der Spielende Mensch II (1992), G.G. Bauer (ed.). Munich & Salzburg: Katzbichler, ISBN 3-87397-334-0, pp. 239–282 (in German).
- Depaulis, Thierry (1981). "Quand le Cuccu est Mécontent". L'As de Trèfle. 11: 23–24.
- Jensen, K. Frank (1980). "Playing-cards in Denmark" in The Journal of the Playing-Card Society, Vol. 8, No. 4 (May 1980), pp. 118ff. Describes Gnav cards and pieces at pp. 128–129.
- Kastner, Hugo Die große Humboldt-enzyklopädie der Kartenspiele pg. 30 Humboldt (2205) ISBN 3-89994-058-X (in German)
- Kuromiya, Kimihiko (2011). "A Note on the History of Cuccù". The Playing-Card. 39 (4): 232–233.
- Kuromiya, Kimihiko (2015). "Playing the Game: Gnav in Germany", in The Playing-Card, Vol. 43, No. 4 (Apr–June 2015). pp. 237–238.
- Muller, Alexandra (2008). "A Curious Reunion of Italian Collectors". The Playing-Card. 37 (1): 7.
- Pratesi, Franco (1990). "Italian Cards-New Discoveries 13: Cards and Men for Cucu". The Playing-Card. 19 (2): 75–76.
- Smith, A. G. (1991a). "The 'Cambio' Packs and the Games Played with Them. I. Hexenspiel and Quittli" in The Playing-Card, Vol. XIX, No. 3 (February 1991), pp. 93ff.
- Smith, A.G. (1991b). "The Cambio Packs and the Games played with them II - Hypp, Gnav and Kille". The Playing-Card. XIX (4): 118–127.
- Smith, Anthony (1991c). "The 'Cambio' Packs and the Games played with them: III Cuccu". The Playing-Card. 20 (1): 22.
