= Höllfahren =

Historical German card game

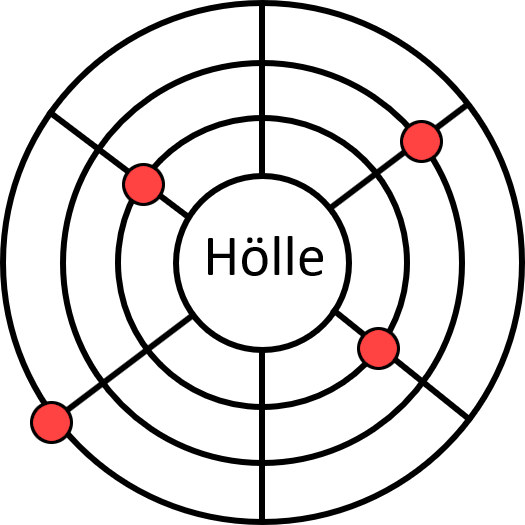
Counters on the board of the game of Hölle

Höllfahren is an historical German card game using playing cards and a layout or special board.

== Name ==
Höllfahren literally means "going to hell" and refers to the mode of play in which players advanced towards the centre of a circular layout, the centre of which was called die Hölle i.e. "hell". The game was also known by various other names including Untreuer Nachbar ("Disloyal Neighbour") in Pomerania as well as der Untreue ("Betrayer") or in die Hölle fahren ("Going to Hell") or just Hölle in other German-language areas.

== History ==
The game is recorded as early as 1617 as der untrewe Nachbaur ("the unfaithful neighbour") or in die Hell ("into hell"), although its rules are not described until the 19th century.

== Rules ==
The following description is based on von Hahn (1905):

For the game of Hölle four concentric circles are chalked on the table with a line radiating from the centre to each player who has a counter or other object which may be moved backwards and forwards along the line. Players are dealt one card each which they look at and, if they think they can exchange it for a higher one, may ask for another card. At a signal from the game 'leader' they face their cards and the one with the lowest card (Aces being low) moves one place nearer the "hellhole" i.e. moves a counter onto the outermost circle. The cards are redealt and play continues in this way until all bar one player reaches the centre, whereupon that remaining player is the winner.

The game could be given added interest by strict rules of conduct, the infringement of which incurred a penalty move. For example, if players touched their cards before the leader tapped thrice on the table and called "Schnapp!", they had to move one place nearer the centre. Likewise a player who asked for a new card or faced a card before being commanded also had to move forward one place as a penalty.

== Bibliography ==
- Hainhofer, Philipp (1617). Travel diary for 1617.
- Richter, Jonas (2022). "Höllfahren: Ein Überblick" in Das Blatt. https://doi.org/10.17613/zzny-7g33
- Richter, Jonas (13. Januar 2023). "Das Höllenspiel (Schubert, Halle a.d. Saale)". GeSpiele. https://doi.org/10.58079/p14b
- Von Hahn, Alban (c. 1905). Buch der Spiele. 4th edn. Leipzig: Otto Spamer.
