= Vogelspiel =

Historical Bavarian and Austrian card game

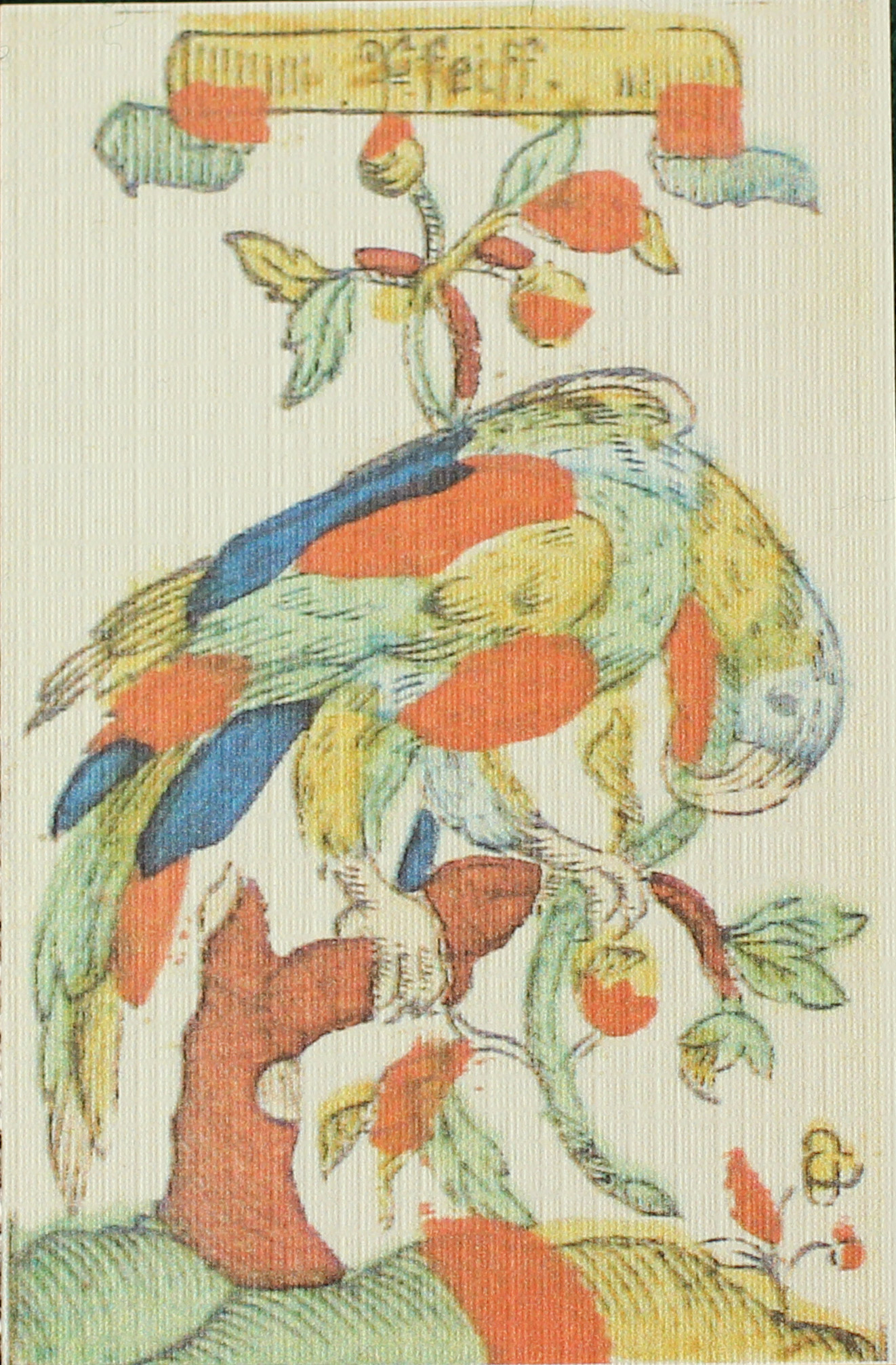
- The Birdː the top card in Vogelspiel
- Origin: Germany and Austria
- Alternative names: Hexenspiel
- Type: social and family game
- Family: Cuckoo group
- Players: 5 – 20
- Cards: 32
- Deck: Vogelspiel pack
- Rank (high→low): See text

Related games
- Cuccu

Vogelspiel (game of "Bird") or Hexenspiel (game of "Witch") was an historical Bavarian and Austrian card game for a variable number of players and played with special cards. The game is named after the bird or witch that appeared on the highest or lowest cards respectively. The name Vogelkarten ("bird cards") is also encountered.

== History ==
The game is descended from Cuccù, an 18th-century Italian game that, as Malcontenta, in turn was derived from the French game of Mécontent, a gambling and children's game that goes back to the early 16th century. (Note: The game was also known as Hère but eventually the name Coucou ("Cuckoo") prevailed. Coucou is still played in France today.) Italian Cuccù originally had 38 cards comprising two sets of 10 numerals and 9 picture cards; the five matadors being the Cuckoo, Hunter, Horse, Cat and Tavern, while the four low cards were the Zero (Nulla), Bucket, Mask and Fool.

Special packs of 32 cards were made for Vogelspiel, Hexenspiel or Hexelspiel. These comprised two sets of 10 or 12 picture cards but only one set of numerals ranging from I to X or XII. The themes of top cards were almost identical to those of Cuccù – Bird, Guard, Cat, Horse and Tavern – although the ranking of the Cat and Horse were switched. Some packs retained the Nulla as the highest of the low cards; in other packs they were dropped in favour of the XI and XII. Meanwhile the Bucket became the Glass and the Mask became a Witch. Again the order was changed with the Witch being last and the Fool being promoted. Two new low cards – the Plate and the Sausages – were added.

The earliest surviving packs date to the second half of the 18th century and they were produced in Austria-Hungary and the Kingdom of Bavaria until the end of the century; one pack still being issued by Piatnik in the 1930s. In Austria, the name Hexenspiel was mostly used; the Bavarians and Upper Austrians called it Vogelspiel.

== Cards ==
The pack comprises 32 cards with 12 numeral cards and 10 pairs of non-identical picture cards ranking from highest to lowest as shown. The actions shown are based on Adrian and Pichler; any variations being noted.

Card name	Austrian/Bavarian	Action on being challenged
Bird	Pfeiff	No exchange takes place and the exchanger loses 2 lives
Guard	Werda	No exchange takes place and the exchanger loses a life
Cat	Miau	No exchange takes place and the exchanger loses a life
Horse	Hott	No exchange takes place and either the exchanger loses a life (Adrian) or all exchanges are reversed and the deal ends (Pichler)
Tavern	Einkerth	No exchange takes place and the exchanger loses a life. (In Pichler, if the challenger holds Plate, both lose a life.)
I – XII	I – XII	Cards exchanged. (Note: Adrian only has cards I–X.)
Nulla	Nulla	Cards exchanged. (Note: Nulla is absent from Pichler's pack.)
Plate	Deller, Teller	Cards exchanged
Sausages	Wurst	Cards exchanged
Glass	Glas	Cards exchanged
The Fool	Narr	Cards exchanged
Witch	Hex	Cards exchanged

== Rules ==
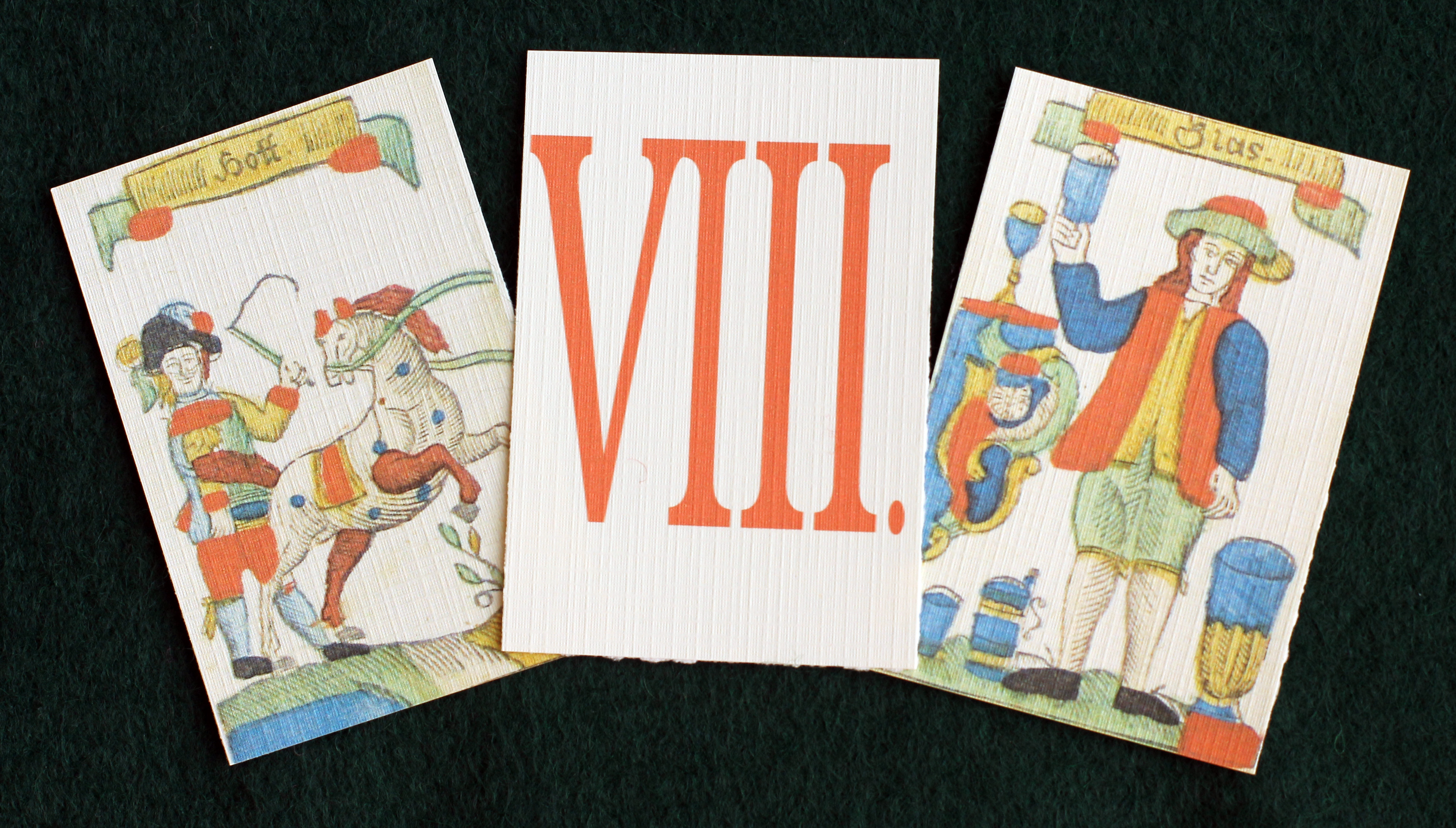
The Horse, the VIII and the Glass

Smith (1991) states that while the ranking of the cards is consistent and clear from leaflets dating to the late 18th century and early 19th century, the actual rules of play are not very explicit, but may have been similar to those of Cuccù with the exception that the player with the lowest card was only penalised if either no-one has been penalised during play or if the person so penalised was unable to pay the full penalty.

=== Adrian ===
A description by Karl Adrian (1909) in a book on Salzburg's culture and customs gives much simpler rules. Four to twenty may play; everyone gets 1 card and has 3 lives. In turn, a player may keep the card dealt or exchange it with the left-hand neighbour. A neighbour with one of the matadors (top 5 cards) names it, the cards are not exchanged and the exchanger loses a life, or 2 lives if it is the Pfeiff. Presumably the dealer may exchange with the stock. Once everyone has had a turn, the cards are faced and the player with the lowest loses a life, or 2 if it is the Hex. The player with the most lives at the end, wins. The lives were recorded as lines (Striche), probably on a slate, and a stroke was erased each time a life was lost.

=== Pichler ===
There is a set of rules accompanying an 18th century Austrian pack of "Vogelspiel" cards by Johan Georg Pichler in the British Museum. The 32 cards are as described above and with the same ranking, except that the two Nulla cards are replaced by numerals XI and XII. The game is played "like Höllfahren in which cards are swapped around". In Höllfahren each player received one card from a pack and had an opportunity to swap it before all the cards were revealed and the one with the lowest card moved a counter one place nearer the centre of the circular board or diagram drawn for the purpose.

In Pichler's account of Vogelspiel each player receives 6 or 7 "little lines" (Strichel), presumably marked on a slate, scoresheet or the table. A player with any of the matadors must not exchange it (on penalty of losing a life), but follows the instruction or says the word at the top of the card. Holding a Bird, the player whistles and the challenger erases 2 lines; holding a Horse, the player says "that's the Horse" whereupon all exchanges are reversed, the deal ends and the player with the lowest card erases a line. If a player holding the Guard, Cat or Inn is challenged, they say "Guard", "Miaow" or "Stop and eat", the challenger erases a line. If a Plate holder tries to exchange with the Inn, both lose a line. Otherwise all must swap. The dealer may exchange with the top card of the stock; if that is not wanted, the dealer may exchange with the one below it. Once all have had the opportunity to exchange or stand on their card, the deal ends and the player with the lowest card erases a line. If the two lowest cards are equal, the dealer deals two more and the lowest loses. A player whose last line is erased is out of the game.

== Bibliography ==
- Adrian, Karl (1909). "Das Kartenspiel" in Salzburger Volksspiele, Aufzüge und Tänze. pp. 46–48.
- Depaulis, Thierry (1981). "Quand le Cuccu est Mécontent". L'As de Trèfle. 11: 23–24.
- Endebrock, Peter (2018). "One of a Kind: Hexenspiel or Vogelspiel" in The Playing-Card, Vol. 47, No. 2 (Oct–Dec 2918), pp. 78–80.
- Smith, A. G. (1991). "The 'Cambio' Packs and the Games Played with Them. I. Hexenspiel and Quittli" in The Playing-Card, Vol. XIX, No. 3 (February 1991), pp. 93ff.
