= Kille (card game) =

Swedish card game

- Enkortskille
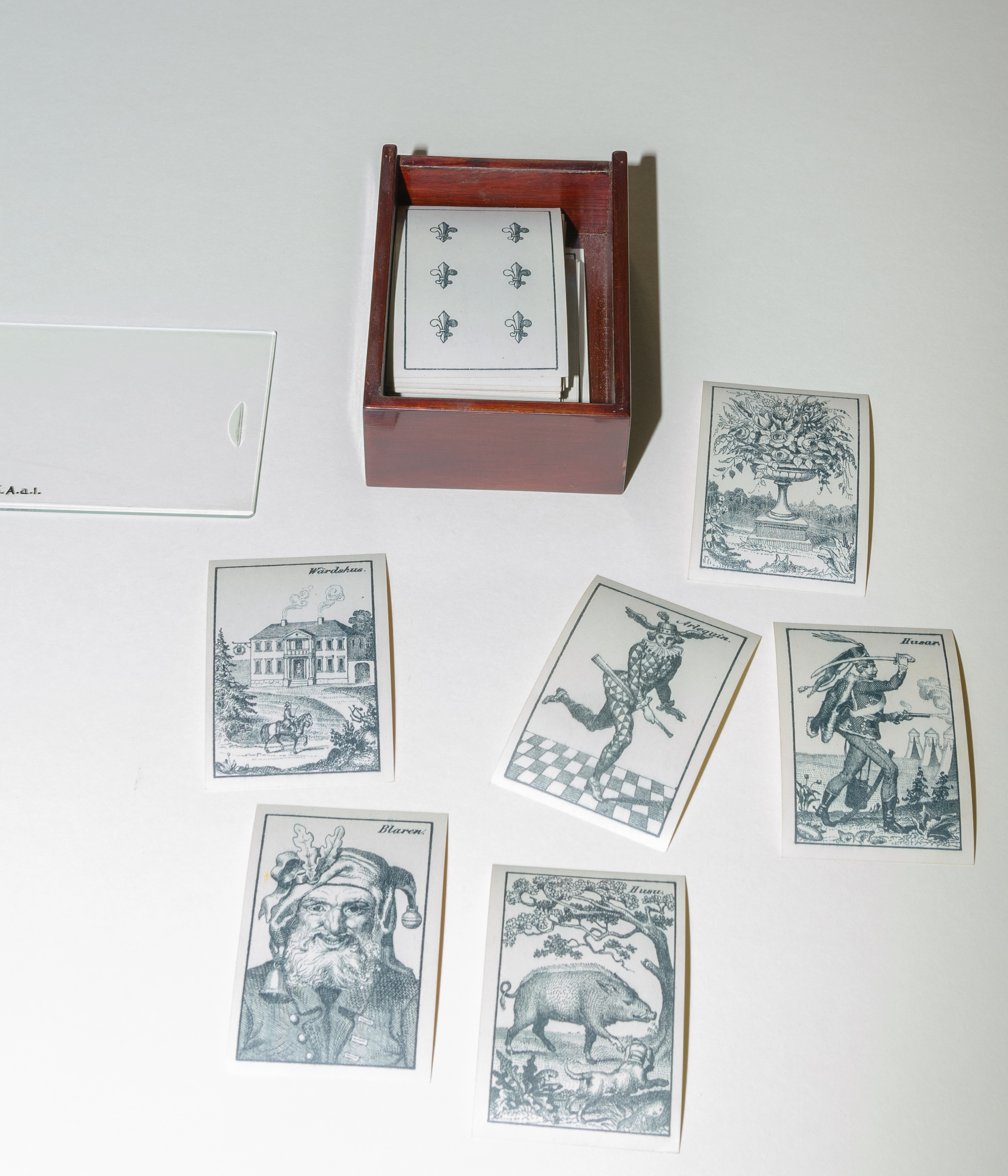
- Kille cards manufactured in 1897 in Stockholm by A Boman. From the collection of the Hallwyl Museum
- Origin: Sweden
- Type: Cuckoo group
- Players: 3 – 13
- Cards: 42 cards
- Deck: Kille cards
- Playing time: 5 min/deal

Related games
- Cuccù

Kille (Swedish pronunciation: [ˈɕɪ̂lːɛ] or [ˈkɪ̂lːɛ] (Note: The pronunciation with /k/ is more common in southern Sweden.)), also called Harlequin, Cambio, Campio, Kambio or Kamfio, is a game played with special playing cards, dating from a medieval French gambling game. In Sweden, the game had its heyday during the 1750s, but it is one of the oldest card games still played.

== History ==
The French gambling game of Coucou was invented in France around 1500 and spread across Central Europe. In the late 17th century, an Italian manufacturer produced a deck of cards adapted for the game. The game was named Cuccú after its highest card. Cuccú had 38 cards and two cards of each denomination (thus 19 unique denominations). Eleven of the cards in each suite were numeral cards, numbered 0-10. The other cards were picture cards, two of which – the Bucket and the Masque – ranked lower than the numerals. Five of the cards were ranked higher: the Inn, Cat, Horse, Guard, and Cuckoo (highest). The nineteenth card, the Fool, the precursor of Kille's Harlequin, was outside the rankings and its value was determined by the game played and could vary during the same game.

Cuccú spread north across Europe and became known in southern Germany, Austria and Switzerland under the names of Hexenspiel and Vogelkarten, which literally mean "Witch game" and "Bird cards".

The card game changed somewhat on its journey through Europe and was mentioned in Sweden as Campio for the first time in 1741 in a court record. Campio was a distortion of cambio or camfio, which was the name that began to be used in Sweden. The name Kille is first documented in 1833 (found in private correspondence from 1826) and was widely used from the 1850s. Kille is probably a corruption of Harlequin which was now the highest ranked card, but still had a special position in some games.

The card game's numeral and picture cards changed so that the pack consisted of 42 cards (again in pairs, so there were only 21 denominations). The number of numerals had increased to twelve and were numbered 1-12. There were three cards with lower values than the number cards; the Noll (Zero) numeral card became the Wreath, the Bucket became the Flowerpot and the Mask became the Fool, often depicted with a mask. The cards with higher values than the numerals were, in ascending order: the Inn, Cavalier, Pig, Hussar, Cuckoo and Harlequin.

== Culture ==
The game of Kille has left its mark on the Swedish language. For example, the phrases "Svinhugg går igen" ("the pig bites back"), referring to a rudeness that rebounds on the performer, and "gå värdshus förbi" ("go past the inn"), a lost opportunity, both come from the game of One-Card Kille.

Kille has also found its way into Swedish literature. Carl Michael Bellman's Fredman's Testament number 181, The Game of Cambio, is about a player's despair during a game:

Hej, gutår, och kambio!
Granne, marsch ur potten!
Blaren, den hundsvotten —
Kambio . . . och kuku står.
Jag ser skorsten ryka:
Värdshus måste stryka...

Translation:

Hey, cheers, and Cambio!
Neighbour, march away from the pot!
The Fool, that scoundrel —
Cambio . . . and Cuckoo stands fast.
I see a chimney smoking:
The Inn must strike ...

Falstaff, fakir rhymed in an ABC for the letter P:

Proletären gärna ville
dricka punsch och spela kille

Translation:

The common labourer was eager
to drink punch and play Kille

== Cards ==
The deck comprises 42 cards of a single suit, comprising two copies of 21 distinct cards. The denominations, ranking from highest to lowest are:

Card names and actions in Kille
Card name	Swedish	Action on being challenged
Harlequin	Harlekin, Kille (Note: Although Kille can mean "boy" or "guy", it is not pronounced with a hard "k", but a softer "ch", so it is probably short for Harlequin.)	Exchanged face up. Highest card if drawn or dealt. Lowest on exchange.
Cuckoo	Kuku, Kucku, Gök	Holder says "Cuckoo stands!", "No one swaps the Cuckoo!" or "The pigeon's taken off!". The round ends and all reveal their cards
Hussar	Husar, Husse (Note: Husse means "master".)	Holder says "Hussar strikes!", the exchanger is knocked out
Pig	Husu, Gris, Svin (Note: Svin means "swine".)	Holder says "Pig bites back!", there is no swap, all earlier swaps are reversed and the player who originally held the card that now was attempting to be swapped is knocked out.
Cavalier	Kavall	Holder says "Pass the cavalier!" and exchanger challenges the next in line
Inn or Tavern	Värdshus	Holder says "Pass the tavern!" and exchanger challenges the next in line
1 – 12	1 – 12	Cards exchanged
Wreath	Kransen	Cards exchanged
Flowerpot	Blompotten, Blomkrukan, Pottan (Note: Pottan means "potty" or "chamber pot".)	Cards exchanged
Mask	Blaren, Blarre	Cards exchanged

Kille packs are still available. Two Swedish manufacturers, Öberg (Carta Mundi) and Offason, make them today. The images are in a sepia colour. A coloured pack was produced in 1975 but is no longer available.

== One-Card Kille (Swap Kille) ==
One-Card Kille (Enkortskille), also Swap Kille (Byteskille), is the traditional game of chance played with Kille cards. It is played for money and may be played by 3 to 12 participants.

Before each deal, each player puts the same amount of money into the pot. Dealer gives one card to each player. The objective is not to have the lowest ranking card after all players have had the opportunity to exchange cards. The one with the lowest card is knocked out, but there are other ways to be knocked out before the cards are finally exposed.

Play is clockwise starting with the player to the left of the dealer. In turn, players may exchange their card with the person sitting to the left, and in that case say "switch" (byte) and push the card forward. Players who at their turn do not want to exchange cards, say "satisfied" (nöjd) and slap the table. With a few exceptions, the exchange is made with the cards face down. The exchange is not always carried out. If the player to the left has one of the cards below, it is exposed while saying a set phrase:

- Cuckoo: If the player has a Cuckoo, the deal is over and everyone must reveal their cards. The person with the Cuckoo says "No one swaps with the Cuckoo!", "Cuckoo stands!" or "The pigeon's taken off!".
- Hussar: When exchanging with a Hussar, the cardholder answers "the Hussar strikes". The player who tries to make an exchange is knocked out, "dead".
- Pig: The holder of a Pig says "the Pig bites back". The attempted exchange is cancelled, but on top of that all previous exchanges involving the card which is the subject of the attempted exchange are reversed so that it ends up with the player who had received it from the dealer. That player is then knocked out.
- Cavalier and Inn: The holder of a Cavalier or Inn says "go past the Cavalier" or "go past the Inn" and the exchanger must bypass the holder and try to make an exchange with the next person.

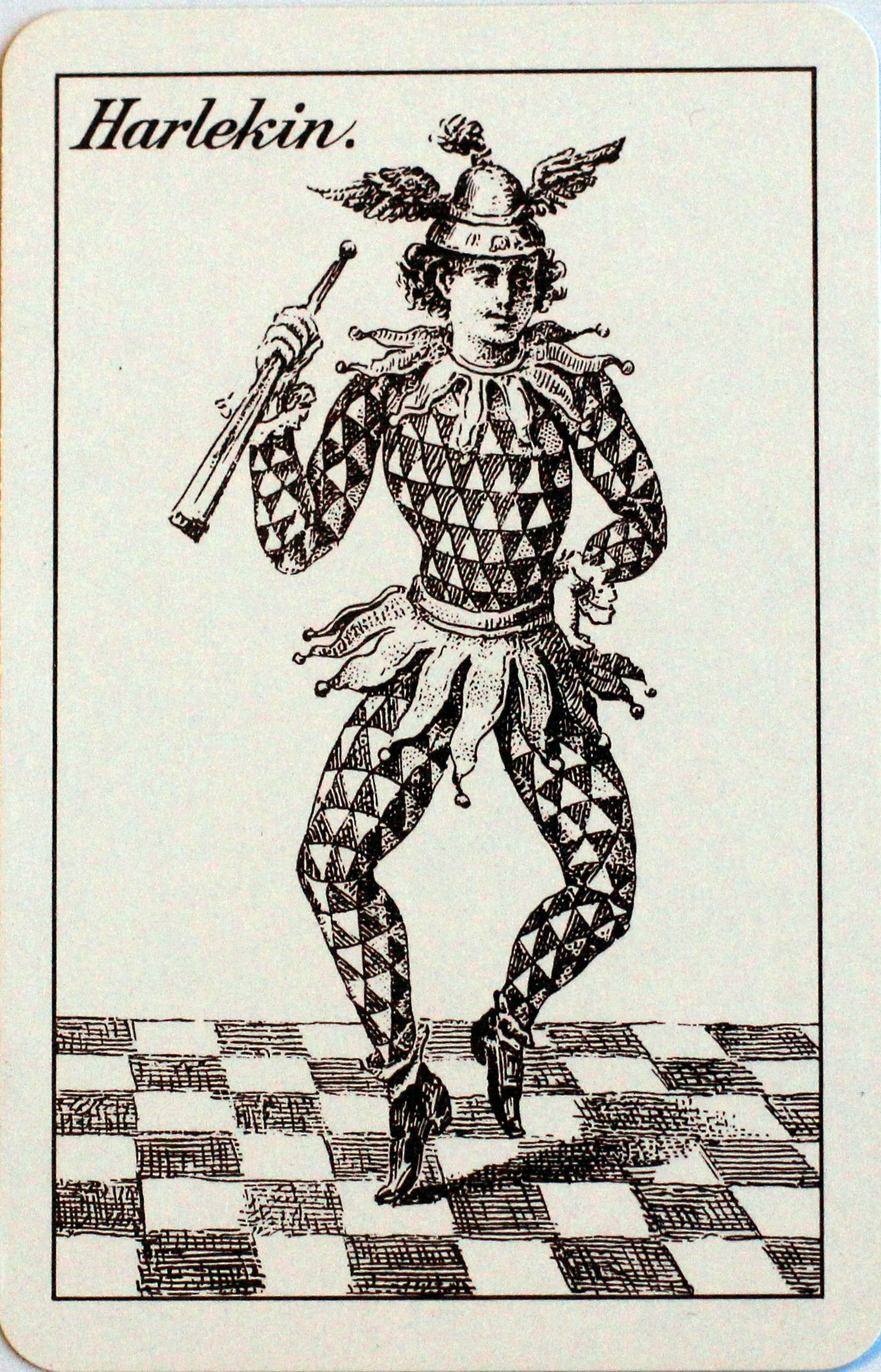
The Harlequin

Other rules:

- Exchanging with the stock: The dealer goes last. If the dealer wants to exchange, this must be done with the stock. Likewise a player who wanted to exchange with the dealer if the dealer has the Cavalier or Inn, must exchange with the stock. If the Cavalier or Inn is drawn from the stock, it is not exchanged.
- Cards that are exposed during an exchange remain exposed for the remainder of the deal.
- Harlequins are exchanged face up. If a Harlequin is dealt or drawn from the stock, it ranks as the highest card. If it is exchanged, it becomes the lowest card. Variant: If a Harlequin is drawn from the stock or if it is one of two Harlequins that meet in an exchange, it ranks as the highest card. Otherwise, it is the lowest card.

When there is a showdown, either because all players had the opportunity to make an exchange or because a player has encountered a Cuckoo, the player who has the lowest card apart from the Harlequins is out along with players that were knocked out by a Hussar or a Pig and players who have a low-ranking Harlequin. It is possible for several players to fulfil at least one of these criteria.

Variant: When there are only two or three players left, the player to the dealer's left may propose a new deal. If the dealer accepts, the cards are thrown in and the same dealer deals again. If the dealer rejects the proposition, the play continues. If there is a third player, the dealer may remit the decision to the third player who then must accept or reject the proposition.

It is possible to re-enter the game for another stake, but only three times: the first time for a single stake, the second time for half the pot, and the last time for a full pot. The players must re-enter in the deal after the one in which they were knocked out. Variant: Players may only re-enter twice. The first time, they re-enter for a double stake. They may only re-enter in the deal after the first one in which only three players were left. (If there is no such deal, for example because three players were knocked out in a deal with four active players, they may not re-enter.) The second time, they re-enter for half the pot or for a full pot. They may only re-enter a second time in the deal after the first one in which only two players were left.

When two players remain, the cards are re-dealt if one of them has received the Harlequin, and there is an immediate showdown if one of them has received the Cuckoo. A player who tries to exchange with the Pig or Hussar has immediately lost.

== Other games with Kille cards ==
- Femkortskille (Knackkille) with its variants Auction Kille or Poker Kille
- Krypkille with its variants Sneaky Kille or Åland Kille

== Bibliography ==
- Glimne, Dan (2016), Kortspelshandboken (3rd, expanded ed.), Stockholm: Känguru, pp. 405–426, ISBN 978-91-7663-115-7
- Torgny, Ove (2003), Tio spel med spader kung, Stockholm: Bilda, pp. 90–100, ISBN 91-574-7484-2
- Werner, Einar; Sandgren, Tore (1975), Kortoxen (9th, rev. ed.), Stockholm: Forum, pp. 103–111, ISBN 91-37-05798-7
- A. G. Smith (1991). "The Cambio Packs and the Games Played with Them. I – Hexenspiel and Quittli". The Playing-Card. XIX (3): 93–103.
- A. G. Smith (1991). "The Cambio Packs and the Games Played with Them. II – Hypp, Gnav and Kille". The Playing-Card. XIX (4): 118–127.
