= Haggis (card game) =

Type of card game

- Players: 2, 3
- Setup time: 1 minute
- Playing time: 45 minutes
- Chance: Medium
- Age range: 13+
- Skills: Strategic thought

Haggis is a shedding card game similar to Tichu, Zheng Fen, and other East Asian climbing games. Haggis has received praise for being the first to successfully create a climbing, trick-taking game, designed from the start for two to three players, where most previous games required four players or more. The evenly distributed, face card "bombs" are a notable innovation for the genre, helping even out hand strength enough to make two-person play workable, and enhancing the strategic element of the game.

The game's designer, Sean Ross, developed Haggis over a period of several years, with first publication in late 2010 by Indie Boards and Cards. The game was named after haggis partly in a nod to Ross' Scottish heritage, but also because the game brought together the "guts" (scoring and play mechanisms) of several other climbing games. Haggis was a nominee for "Best Card Game" in the 2010 Golden Geek Awards by BoardGameGeek.

== Rules summary ==
Players attempt to accumulate points; the first to reach a predetermined score (usually 250 or 350) is the winner. The scoring of Haggis gives incentives for capturing cards and for going out first. Successful players balance these two goals to strive for the most points. Additional points may be gained by successfully betting you'll be the first to shed your hand.

A valid card combination may be a set, a sequence or a bomb:

- a "set" is a group of any number of cards of the same rank (ex: one "8", two "5", ...).
- a "sequence" is a group of 3 or more cards of the same color with consecutive rank (ex: red 8, red 9, red 10)
- a "sequence" can also be a group of 2 or more pairs or larger sets of consecutive rank sharing the same suits between sets (ex: blue 3, green 3, blue 4, green 4, blue 5, green 5)
- a "bomb" is one of the following combinations (ranked below from weakest to strongest):
  - 3-5-7-9 (in 4 different colors, "rainbow bomb")
  - J-Q
  - J-K
  - Q-K
  - J-Q-K
  - 3-5-7-9 (in one color, "suited bomb")

Face cards can be used as wild cards to replace any cards in a "set" or a "sequence". Each player starts a round with a Jack, a Queen and a King. These face cards are public. The face cards can also be used individually as their actual rank, thus a single Jack can be played to beat a single 10, a Queen to beat a Jack, etc. Two face cards may not be played as a pair, such as a Jack and King played as a pair of Kings, because this combination is a bomb and must be played as such.

On their turns, players must play higher ranking combinations with exactly the same type and same number of card as the first combination played, or pass. Bombs are an exception: players can play a bomb to beat any combination, except a higher bomb.

When all but one player pass in succession, the player who played the highest combination capture all cards played. But if the highest combination is a bomb, cards are captured by the player with the next higher combination. Then, a new trick starts. The winner of the last trick leads the new trick with any combination.

== Setup ==
- For a two-player game:
  - Remove a Jack, a Queen, and a King
  - Remove one complete suit
- Each player is dealt a Jack, a Queen, and a King face up in front of them. These cards are part of the player's hand, but are played from the face-up position.
- Shuffle the remaining cards and deal 14 to each player.
- The remainder of the deck is the "Haggis" and is set aside until scoring.

== Scoring ==
Points can be gained from three sources:

1. Cards remaining in opponents' hands
2. Cards captured from winning tricks
3. Bets

When a player goes out, they immediately count the number of cards held by the opponent with the most cards remaining in hand, and gains 5 points for each card counted. Remember that unplayed face cards count as part of the hand.

All point cards captured during the game give their points to the players who captured them. Odd-numbered cards are worth one point each, and each Jack, Queen, and King are worth 2, 3 and 5 points respectively. Even-numbered cards score nothing.

If a bettor is successful in going out first, the player gains the number of points wagered (30 points for a successful "Big bet", 15 points for a successful "Little bet"). However, if a bettor fails to go out first, the points are awarded to the player who did manage to go out first, and to any third player who made no bets in that round.
