= Coucou =

French card game

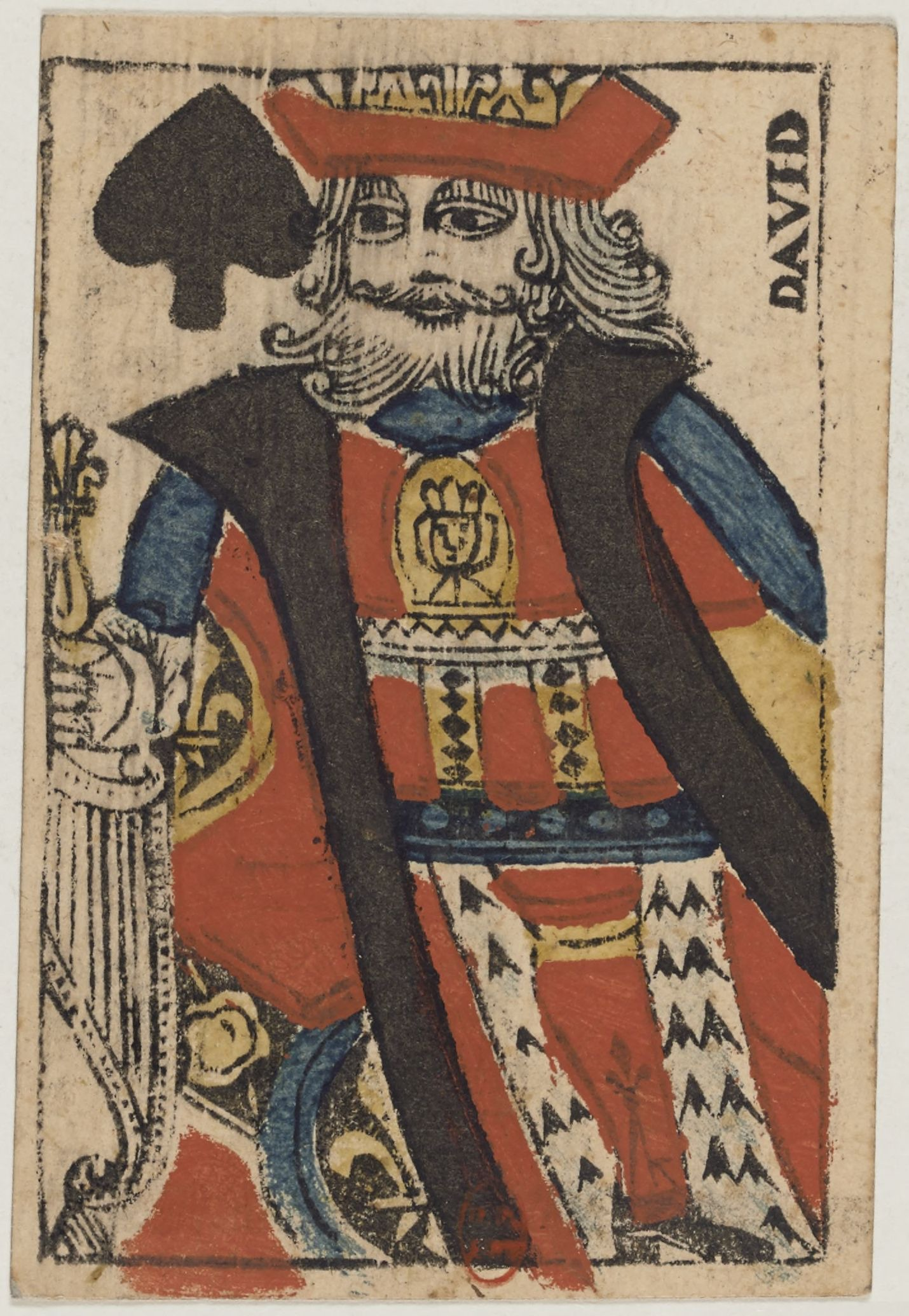
- If a player attempts to trade their card for a king, the holder of the king cries "Coucou!"
- Origin: France
- Alternative names: As qui court, Hère
- Type: social game, game of chance
- Family: Cuckoo group
- Players: 5 – 20
- Age range: 6+
- Cards: 32 or 52
- Deck: Piquet or standard pack
- Rank (high→low): K Q J 10 9 8 7 (6 – 2) A
- Play: Anticlockwise
- Playing time: 10 – 45 minutes

Related games
- Cuccù, Tontine, Vogelspiel, Kille, Ranter-Go-Round

Coucou ("Cuckoo") is an historical French card game that uses a pack of 32 or 52 cards and is played by five to twenty players. It is unusual for being played with only a single card in hand. As a shedding game, there is only one winner who may claim the stakes, if there are any. The game has also been called As Qui Court or Hère.

== History ==
The earliest references to the game date to the early 16th century in France where it was known by the name of Mécontent (also Méscontent, Maucontent or Malcontent) and was played with a standard 52-card deck. The first rules appear under the name Hère in 1690 and as Coucou in 1721. The name As Qui Court appears in the mid-19th century, but the name Coucou ("cuckoo") persisted and the game is still played in France today under that name. (Note: See e.g. Mora (2000), pp. 57–58.)

The game migrated to England by 1881 as Ranter-Go-Round, but is now also sometimes known as Cuckoo.

== Cards ==
The game uses a regular 52-card pack, or a smaller 32-card deck (with 2s through 6s absent) if fewer than seven are playing. Suits are not relevant; only the card ranks are important. Regardless of whether the 32 or 52 cards is used, the lowest card is always the Ace and the highest the King.

== Deal ==
The first dealer of the game is determined by lots as agreed between the players. The dealer deals in an anti-clockwise direction starting with first hand, the player to the right, dealing one card to each opponent and three as the dealer's hand. (Note: This naturally gives the dealer an advantage.)

After consulting the dealer's three-card hand, the dealer keeps the highest and puts the other two, face down, underneath the remainder of the deck (known as the talon). The talon is then placed between the dealer and the player to the right, who would become the next dealer.

At this point, all players have only one card.

Each players is also each given the same number of chips for scoring; for example, five.

== Play ==
Players view their cards; then the eldest hand (the player to the right of the dealer) starts play.

Beginning with eldest, each player may decide to keep the card dealt if its value is reckoned to be high enough. In this case, the player announces: "I'm keeping", and play passes to the right. If, on the other hand, the value is considered too low, the card may be exchanged with the neighbour's to the right, announcing: "I'm exchanging". The neighbour cannot refuse the exchange, unless they are holding a King, in which case they announce (without revealing the card) "Cuckoo!" to the first player, and no exchange takes place. If the neighbour does not say "Cuckoo", the two players must exchange cards.

Each player, in turn, exchanges to the right. The last player, to the left of the dealer, does not exchange a card with the dealer, but instead with the card on top of the talon. If this card turns out to be a King, no exchange is allowed.

The dealer is obliged to keep the card selected at the outset, having taken advantage of the privilege of choosing from the initial three cards at the time of the deal.

The exchanges being thus finished, players reveal their cards and the player (or players) with the lowest card rank are the losers of the round. Each loser deposits a chip into a basket. When a player has no chips remaining, they must withdraw from the game and are eliminated. The number of players taking part in the game thus decreases as the game progressed, except in the case where all players have the same card rank.

== Winning ==
The game ends when only one player remains in the game, all the others having been eliminated. That player wins the game and sweeps the agreed stake.

If the game is played for stakes, each player at the beginning of the game antes an agreed stake in a basket. The pool thus formed becomes the stake that the winner will win. The larger the number of players at the start of the game, the higher the amount at stake, which means that in "Cuckoo" the winner usually wins a significant amount, while each of the other participants only loses a relatively small amount.

The low financial risk and the simplicity of the game led Lebrun (1828) to classify Coucou as a "game of entertainment".

== Duration ==
The duration of the game depends partly on how quickly each deal is played and partly on how many players there are. In the literature, for example, there is mention of a game lasting three quarters of an hour.

== Other names ==
=== As Qui Court ===
The name 'As Qui Court' ("Running Ace", lit. "the Ace that Runs") is later than Coucou and only appears in the literature around the middle of the 18th century. It is so named because the Ace, as the lowest card, is passed from hand to hand until it returns to the talon unless a King blocks it on the way.

According to Méry (1847), the only difference between As Qui Court and Coucou is that a player who holds a King in hand may refuse the exchange as in Coucou, but instead of announcing "Cuckoo!", reveals the King. However, Méry's rules for As Qui Court also contain the following three significant differences from the rules of Coucou given in L'Académie des jeux compendia published during the 18th century and the rules according to Lacombe (1792):

- the dealer takes only one card instead of three;
- the player to the left of the dealer exchanges with the dealer;
- the dealer can only exchange this card with the talon and only if an Ace was received from the previous player; being the dealer is now a disadvantage.

=== Hère ===
While the name Coucou remains the one adopted by the reference works of the 18th century – the Académie universelle des jeux and Dictionnaire des jeux – the Académie française dictionary never mentions it, preferring instead the name 'Hère'.

According to Lalanne, it is impossible to determine with any certainty whether the "type of card game" mentioned under the name Hère in the first edition of Académie française dictionary in 1694, refers to Coucou or another game, because of a lack of detail. In the 1721 edition of La Plus Nouvelle Académie Universelle des Jeux, the card game called Hère does not correspond in any way to Coucou, but rather to a game of combinations possibly similar to modern poker. This Hère disappears in the 1725 edition of the Académie universelle des jeux, and Coucou makes its appearance there. On the other hand, the fourth edition of the same dictionary, in 1762, partly removes the ambiguity by specifying that Hère refers to a card game where only one of the players wins. The fifth edition of 1798, taking up the previous definition, says "This game is also called As Qui Court."

Meanwhile Furétiere, in the 1690 edition of Dictionnaire Universel, gives a brief description of Here as a game in which each person is given only one card and may exchange it with his or her neighbour; the player ending up with the lowest card losing the deal. Here is also the name of an Ace left in a player's hand causing that player to lose the deal. it is described as "the game of fathers, because they play it even with the smallest children."

Lebrun (1828) does not describe L'As Qui Court but simply Coucou with traditional rules. In a footnote, the author points out that Coucou is also called Her, specifying that when a player receives a King instead of saying "Cuckoo!", announces "Her!"

== See also ==
- Le her
- Kille (card game), a Swedish card game of the Coucou family

== Bibliography ==
- _ (1694). Le dictionnaire de l’Académie française.
- _ (1762). Dictionnaire de l'Académie française. 4th edn. Vol. 1. A-K. Paris: Bernard Brunet. p. 872.
- _ (1792). Dictionnaire de l'Académie française. 5th edn. Vol. 1. A-K. Paris: Bossange. p. 685.
- _ (1799). Dictionnaire de jeux mathématiques. Paris: Agasse. p. 414.
- _ (1881). Cassell's Book of In-Door Amusements, Card Games and Fireside Fun. Cassell.
- Greco, Gioachino and Abbé Bellecour (1721). plus nouvelle académie universelle des jeux, Vol. 1. Leide: van der Aa.
- Lacombe, Jacques (1792). Dictionnaire des jeux, Paris: Panckoucke.
- Le Gras, Théodore (1725). Académie universelle des jeux, Paris.
- Lebrun, M. (1828), Manuel des jeux de calcul et de hasard, Paris: Roret.
- Méry, Joseph (1847). L'Arbitre des jeux, Paris, Gabriel de Gonet.
- Mora, Dolorès (2000). 50 Tours et Jeux de Cartes. Champigny-sur-Marne: Lito.
