= The Playing-Card =

Card game magazine

- Editor: Elettra Deganello
- Former editors: Peter Endebrock
- Frequency: Quarterly
- Publisher: International Playing-Card Society
- First issue: 1972; 54 years ago
- Language: English
- ISSN: 0305-2133
- OCLC: 63765414

The Playing-Card is a quarterly publication, publishing scholarly articles covering all aspects of playing cards and of the games played with them, produced by the International Playing-Card Society (IPCS). The Playing-Card's articles are mostly in English, but also in French, German, Italian, and Spanish.

== History ==
The journal was founded in 1972, as The Journal of the Playing-Card Society (until 1980). Since then it has produced an annual volume of four (formerly six) issues. It has an index of its articles for the years 1972–1997, and contents listings for issues from 1980 to the present.

== Impact ==
According to card game historian David Parlett, card game research has become "a particular pursuit" of the IPCS and many of its field researchers publish their findings in The Playing-Card. This has contributed to "a growing awareness that a society's indoor games are as distinctive of its culture as its arts, cuisine, or social customs, and are worth recording for the light they throw on that community's personality."

== Editors ==
The editors of The Playing-Card and its predecessor have been:

- Sylvia Mann: August 1972 (1/1) – November 1978 (8/2)
- Eddie Cass: February 1979 (8/3) – November 1984 (13/2)
- Trevor Denning: February 1985 (13/3) – May 1990 (18/4)
- Stuart Lawrence: August 1990 (19/1) – May 1995 (23/4)
- George Beal: July/August 1995 (25/1) – Jan/Feb 1998 (26/4)
- Michael Cooper: July/August 1998 (27/1) – April/June 2006 (34/4)
- Peter Endebrock: June/Sept 2006 (35/1) – April/June 2023 (51/4)
- Elettra Deganello: July/Sept 2023 (51/1) – present.

== See also ==
- Games Unplugged

== Bibliography ==
- Parlett, David (2008). The Penguin Book of Card Games, Penguin, London. ISBN 978-0-141-03787-5
