= Card game =

Game using playing cards as the primary device

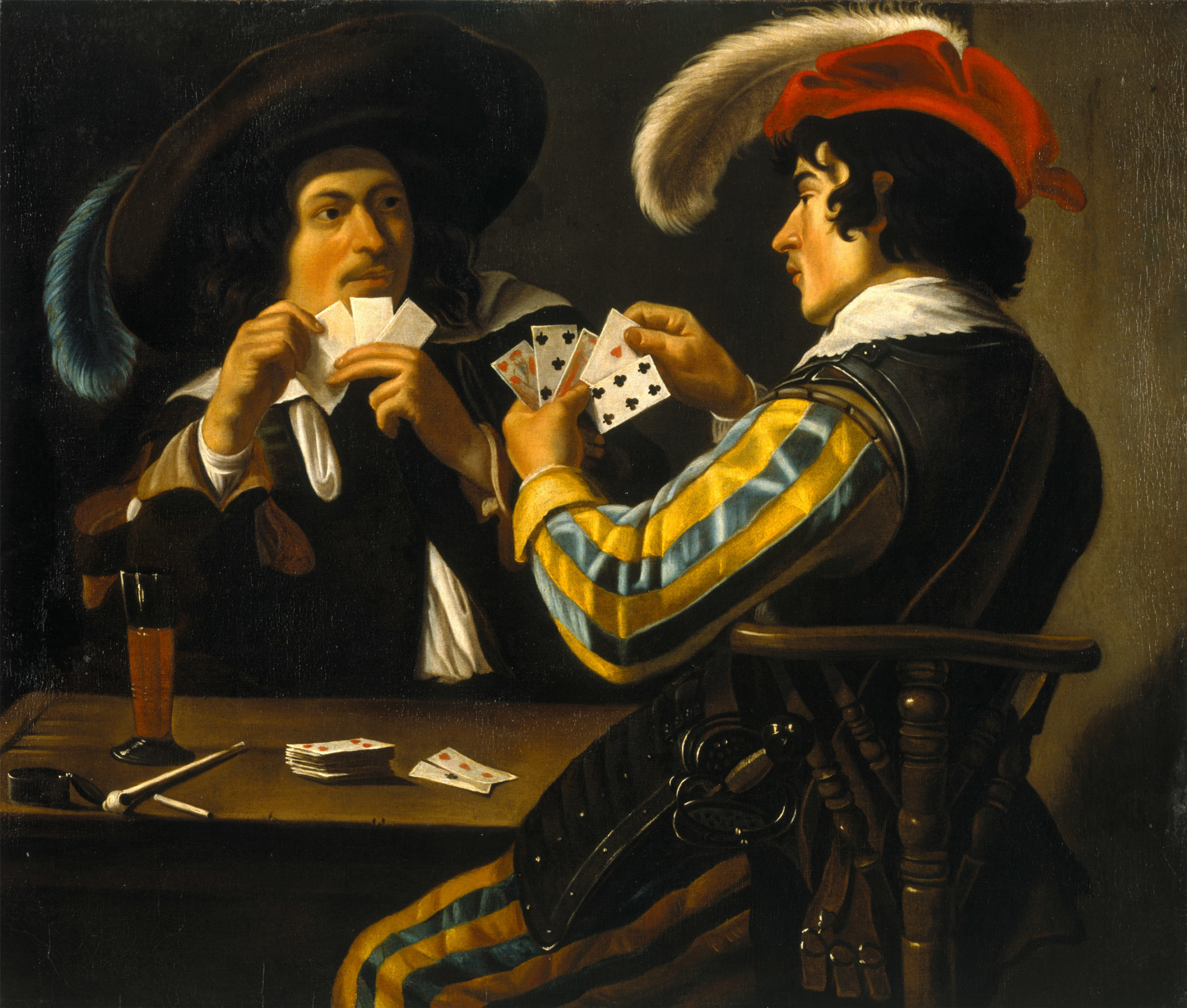
The Card Players, 17th-century painting by Theodoor Rombouts

A card game is any game that uses cards as the primary device with which the game is played, whether the cards are of a traditional design or specifically created for the game (proprietary). Countless card games exist, including families of related games (such as poker). A small number of card games played with traditional decks have formally standardized rules with international tournaments being held, but most are folk games whose rules may vary by region, culture, location or from circle to circle.

Traditional card games are played with a deck or pack of playing cards which are identical in size and shape. Each card has two sides, the face and the back. Normally the backs of the cards are indistinguishable. The faces of the cards may all be unique, or there can be duplicates. The composition of a deck is known to each player. In some cases several decks are shuffled together to form a single pack or shoe. Modern card games usually have bespoke decks, often with a vast amount of cards, and can include number or action cards. This type of game is colloquially regarded as part of the broader "board game" hobby.

Games using playing cards exploit the fact that cards are individually identifiable from one side only, so that each player knows only the cards they hold and not those held by anyone else. For this reason card games are often characterized as games of "imperfect information"—as distinct from games of perfect information, where the current position is fully visible to all players throughout the game. Many games that are not generally placed in the family of card games do in fact use cards for some aspect of their play.

Some games that are placed in the card game genre involve a board. The distinction is that the play in a card game chiefly depends on the use of the cards by players (the board is a guide for scorekeeping or for card placement), while board games (the principal non-card game genre to use cards) generally focus on the players' positions on the board, and use the cards for some secondary purpose.

== History ==
=== 9th to 13th centuries ===
Playing cards were likely invented during the Tang dynasty around the 9th century due to the technological impact of woodblock printing. A 9th-century text known as the Collection of Miscellanea at Duyang (Chinese: 杜阳杂编; pinyin: Dùyáng zábiān) by Tang writer Su E references a leaf game that has been cited as a card game. However it is uncertain if it was actually a card game.

The reference describes Princess Tongchang, daughter of Emperor Yizong of Tang, playing the "leaf game" in 868 with her husband's family. The first known book on the "leaf" game was called the Yezi Gexi and allegedly written by a Tang woman. It received commentary by writers of subsequent dynasties. The Song dynasty (960–1279) scholar Ouyang Xiu (1007–1072) asserts that the "leaf" game existed at least since the mid-Tang dynasty and associated its invention with the development of printed sheets as a writing medium. However, Ouyang also claims that the "leaves" were pages of a book used in a board game played with dice, and that the rules of the game were lost by 1067.

The earliest dated instance of a game involving cards occurred on 17 July 1294 when the Yuan dynasty Department of Punishments caught two gamblers, Yan Sengzhu and Zheng Zhugou, playing with paper cards. Wood blocks for printing the cards were impounded, together with nine of the actual cards. No description of the card game being played was provided.

Other games revolving around alcoholic drinking involved using playing cards of a sort from the Tang dynasty onward. However, these cards did not contain suits or numbers. Instead, they were printed with instructions or forfeits for whoever drew them. A playing card for a wine drinking game dating to the Yuan period (1271–1368) reads:

Card #7: The man from Qi begs for leftovers
Begging for leftovers is truly despicable,
Not satisfied, he goes off elsewhere.
His wife and concubine mock him in turn.
But happily he comes home still wanting to brag.
Instructions: He who gets this order receives an old cup of wine, drinks a little and then begs for wine and food from the guests. Then he brags. If there are courtesans in the party, they pretend to be his wife and concubine and scold him. If there are no courtesans, his two neighbours act as wife and concubine.

— History of Liao

=== 14th and 15th centuries ===
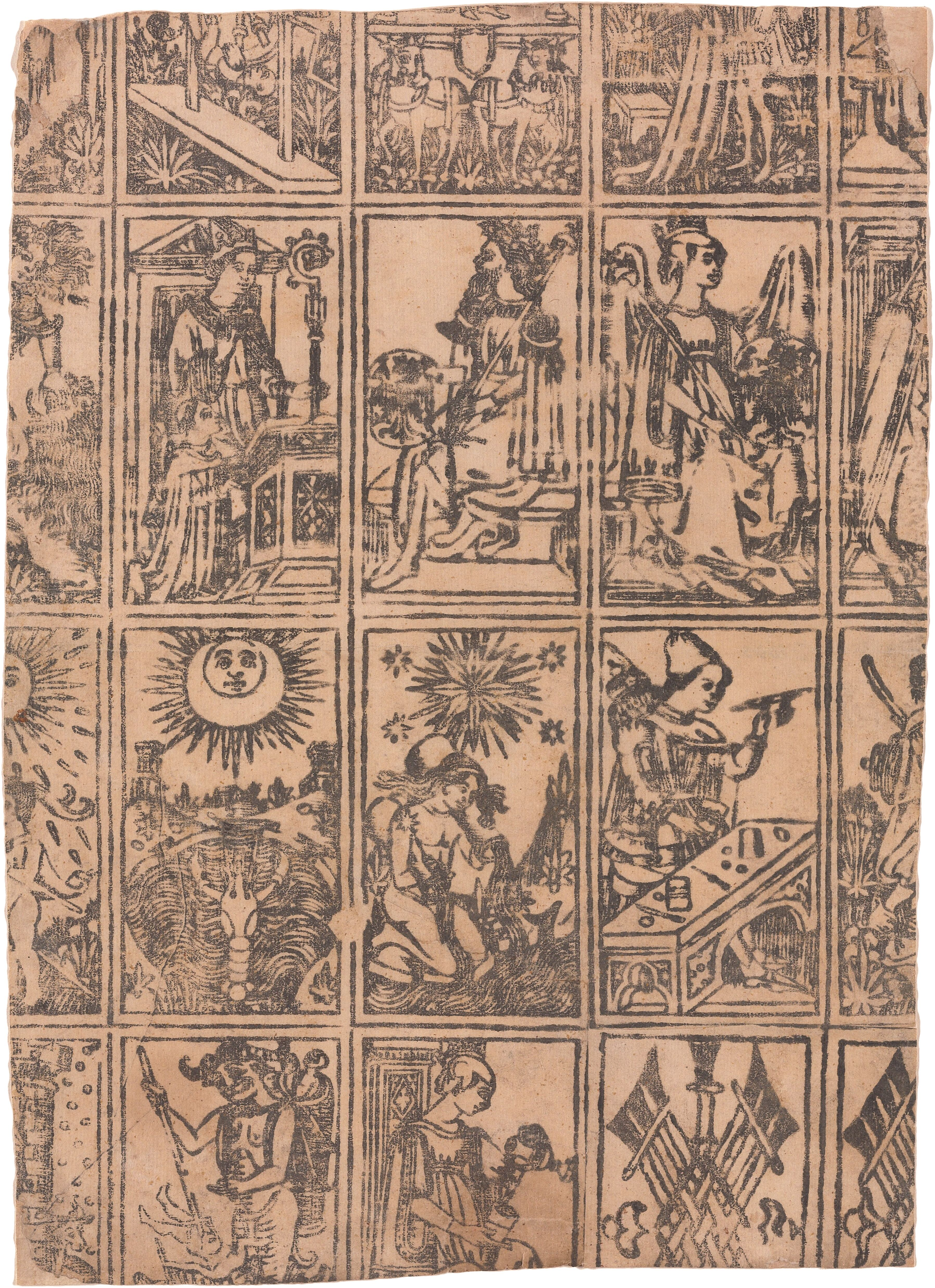
Trionfi sheet

The earliest European mention of playing cards appears in 1371 in a Catalan language rhyme dictionary. This suggests that cards may have been "reasonably well known" in Catalonia (now part of Spain) at that time, perhaps introduced as a result of maritime trade with the Mamluk rulers of Egypt. It is not until 1408 that the first card game is described in a document about the exploits of two card sharps; although it is evidently very simple, the game is not named. In fact the earliest game to be mentioned by name is Karnöffel, first mentioned in 1426 and which is still played in several forms today, including Bruus, Knüffeln, Kaiserspiel and Styrivolt. Ronfa and Condemnade are also recorded during the 15th century.

Since the arrival of trick-taking games in Europe in the late 14th century, there have only been two major innovations. The first was the introduction of trump cards with the power to beat all cards in other suits; the other being the idea of bidding. Such cards were initially called trionfi and first appeared with the advent of Tarot cards in which there is a separate, permanent trump suit comprising a number of picture cards. The first known example of such cards was ordered by the Duke of Milan around 1420 and included 16 trumps with images of Greek and Roman gods. Thus games played with Tarot cards appeared very early on and spread to most parts of Europe with the notable exceptions of the British Isles, the Iberian Peninsula, and the Balkans. However, we do not know the rules of the early Tarot games; the earliest detailed description in any language being those published by the Abbé de Marolles in Nevers in 1637.

The concept of trumps was sufficiently powerful that it was soon transferred to games played with far cheaper ordinary packs of cards, as opposed to expensive Tarot cards. The first of these was Triomphe, the name simply being the French equivalent of the Italian trionfi. Although not testified before 1538, its first rules were written by a Spaniard who left his native country for Milan in 1509 never to return; thus the game may date to the late 15th century.

Other games that may well date to the 15th century are Gleek, Pochen – the game of Bocken or Boeckels being attested in Strasbourg in 1441 – and Thirty-One, which is first mentioned in a French translation of a 1440 sermon by the Italian, Saint Bernadine, the name actually referring to two different card games: one like Pontoon and one like Commerce.

=== 16th century ===
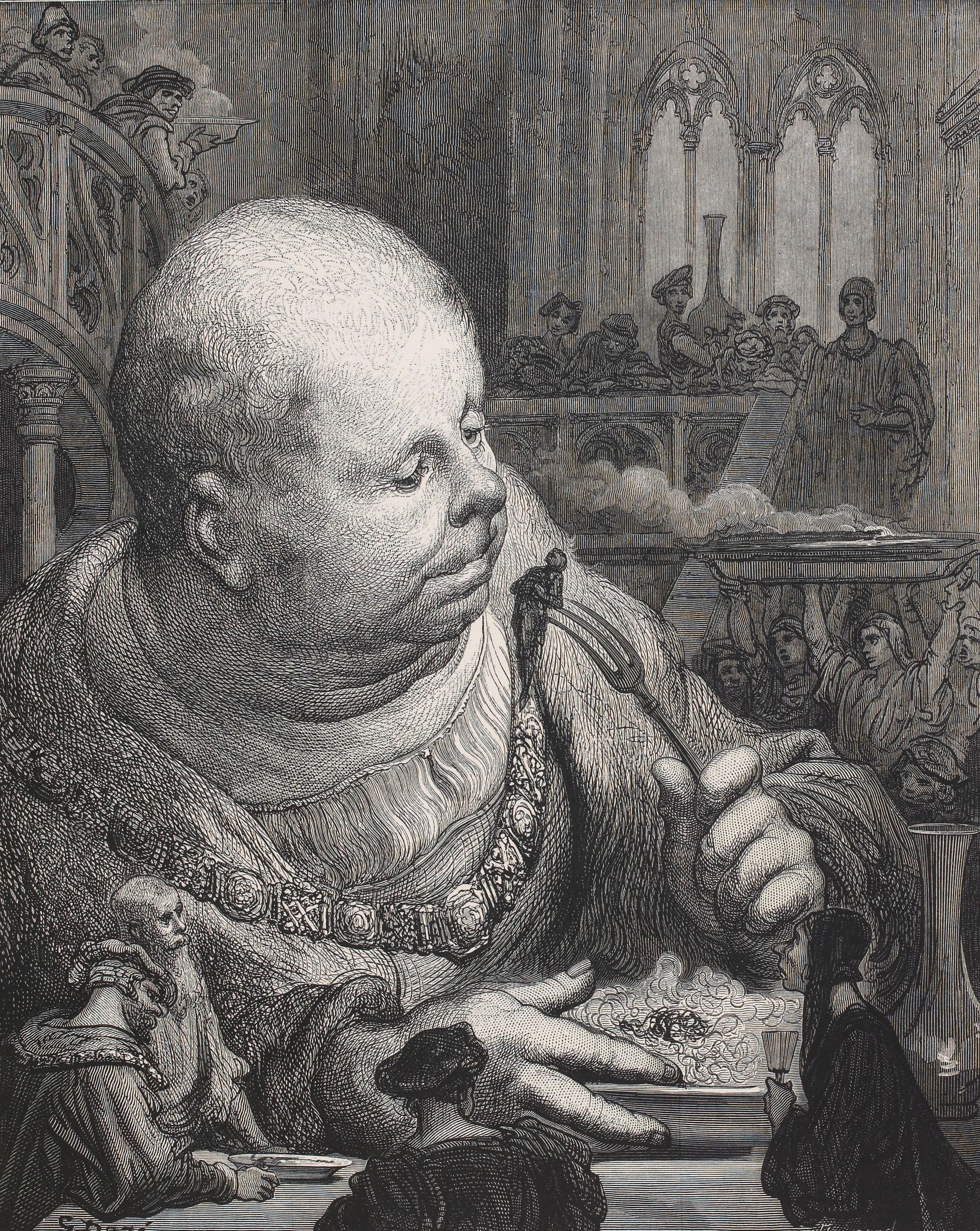
François Rabelais’s giant Gargantua is depicted as a great player of card games

In the 16th century printed documents replace handwritten sources and card games become a popular topic with preachers, autobiographists and writers in general. A key source of the games in vogue in France and Europe at that time is François Rabelais, whose fictional character Gargantua played no less than 30 card games, many of which are recognisable. They include: Aluette, Bête, Cent, Coquimbert, Coucou, Flush or Flux, Gé (Pairs), Gleek, Lansquenet, Piquet, Post and Pair, Primero, Ronfa, Triomphe, Sequence, Speculation, Tarot and Trente-et-Un; possibly Rams, Mouche and Brandeln as well. Girolamo Cardano also provides invaluable information including the earliest rules of Trappola. Among the most popular were the games of Flusso and Primiera, which originated in Italy and spread throughout Europe, becoming known in England as Flush and Primero.

In Britain the earliest known European fishing game was recorded in 1522. Another first was Losing Loadum, noted by Florio in 1591, which is the earliest known English point-trick game. In Scotland, the game of Mawe, testified in the 1550s, evolved from a country game into one played at the royal Scottish court, becoming a favorite of James VI. The ancestor of Cribbage – a game called Noddy – is mentioned for the first time in 1589, "Noddy" being the Knave turned for trump at the start of play.

=== 17th century ===
The 17th century saw an upsurge in the number of new games being reported as well as the first sets of rules, those for Piquet appearing in 1632 and Reversis in 1634. The first French games compendium, La Maison Académique, appeared in 1654 and it was followed in 1674 by Charles Cotton's The Compleat Gamester, although an earlier manuscript of games by Francis Willughby was written sometime between 1665 and 1670. Cotton records the first rules for the classic English games of Cribbage, a descendant of Noddy, and Whist, a development of English Trump or Ruff ('ruff' then meaning 'rob') in which four players were dealt 12 cards each and the dealer 'robbed' from the remaining stock of 4 cards.

In the 17th century, a French, five-trick, gambling game called Bête became popular and spread to Germany, where it was called La Bete and England where it was named Beast. It was a derivative of Triomphe and was the first card game in history to introduce the concept of bidding.

Piquet was a two-player, trick-taking game that originated in France, probably in the 16th century and was initially played with 36 cards before, around 1690, the pack reduced to the 32 cards that gives the Piquet pack its name. Reversis is a reverse game in which players avoid taking tricks and appears to be an Italian invention that came to France around 1600 and spread rapidly to other countries in Europe.

In the mid-17th century, a certain game named after Cardinal Mazarin, prime minister to King Louis XIV, became very popular at the French royal court. Called Hoc Mazarin, it had three phases, the final one of which evolved into a much simpler game called Manille that was renamed Comète on the appearance of Halley's Comet in 1682. In Comète the aim is to be first to shed all one's hand cards to sequences laid out in rows on the table. However, there are certain cards known as 'stops' or hocs: cards that end a sequence and give the one who played it the advantage of being able to start a new sequence. This concept spread to other 17th- and 18th-century games, including Poque, Comete, Emprunt, Manille, Nain Jaune and Lindor, all except Emprunt being still played in some form today.

It was the 17th century that saw the second of the two great innovations being introduced into trick-taking games: the concept of bidding. This first emerged in the Spanish game of Ombre, an evolution of Triomphe that "in its time, was the most successful card game ever invented." Ombre's origins are unclear and obfuscated by the existence of a game called Homme or Bête in France, ombre and homme being respectively Spanish and French for 'man'. In Ombre, the player who won the bidding became the "Man" and played alone against the other two. The game spread rapidly across Europe, spawning variants for different numbers of players and known as Quadrille, Quintille, Médiateur and Solo. Quadrille went on to become highly fashionable in England during the 18th century and is mentioned several times, for example, in Jane Austen's Pride and Prejudice.

The first rules of any game in the German language were those for Rümpffen published in 1608 and later expanded in several subsequent editions. In addition, the first German games compendium, Palamedes Redivivus appeared in 1678, containing the rules for Hoick (Hoc), Ombre, Picquet (sic), Rümpffen and Thurnspiel.

=== 18th century ===
The evolution of card games continued apace, with notable national games emerging like Briscola and Tressette (Italy), Schafkopf (Bavaria), Jass (Switzerland), Mariage, the ancestor of Austria's Schnapsen and Germany's Sixty-Six, and Tapp Tarock, the progenitor of most modern central European Tarot games. Whist spread to the continent becoming very popular in the north and west. In France, Comet appeared, a game that later evolved into Nain Jaune and the Victorian game of Pope Joan.

== Types ==
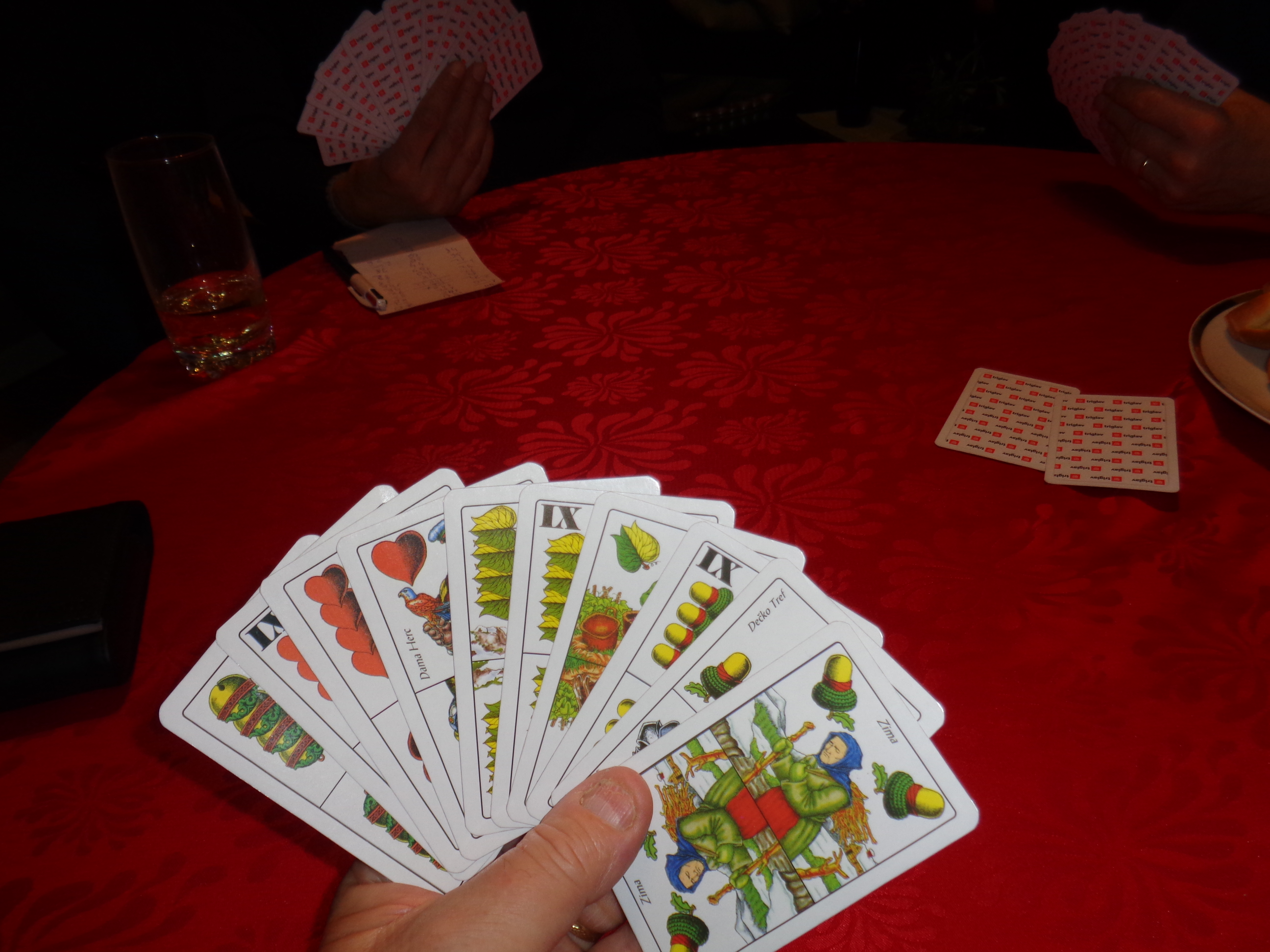
Preferans, a trick-taking card game version popular in Croatia

Card games may be classified in different ways: by their objective, by the equipment used (e.g. number of cards and type of suits), by country of origin or by mechanism (how the game is played). Parlett and McLeod predominantly group cards games by mechanism of which there are five categories: outplay, card exchange, hand comparison, layout and a miscellaneous category that includes combat and compendium games. These are described in the following sections.

== Outplay games ==
Easily the largest category of games in which players have a hand of cards and must play them out to the table. Play ends when players have played all their cards.

=== Trick-taking games ===
Trick-taking games are the largest category of outplay games. Players typically receive an equal number of cards and a trick involves each player playing a card face up to the table – the rules of play dictating what cards may be played and who wins the trick.

There are two main types of trick-taking game with different objectives. Both are based on the play of multiple tricks, in each of which each player plays a single card from their hand, and based on the values of played cards one player wins or "takes" the trick. In plain-trick games the aim is to win a number of tricks, a specific trick or as many tricks as possible, without regard to the actual cards. In point-trick games, the number of tricks is immaterial; what counts is the value, in points, of the cards captured.

==== Plain-trick games ====
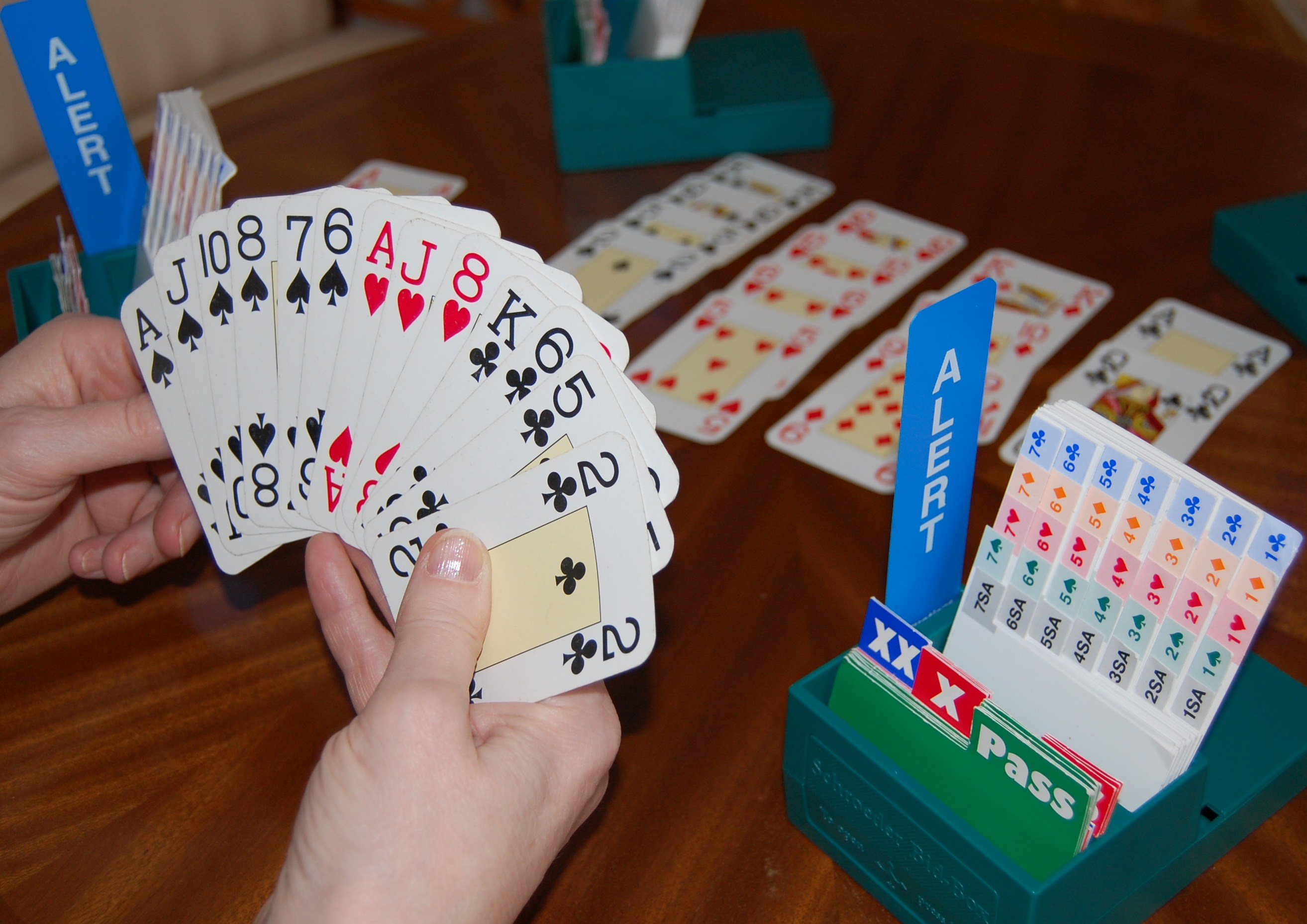
Bridge is a popular plain-trick game

Many common Anglo-American games fall into the category of plain-trick games. The usual objective is to take the most tricks, but variations taking all tricks, making as few tricks (or penalty cards) as possible or taking an exact number of tricks. Bridge, Whist and Spades are popular examples. Hearts, Black Lady and Black Maria are examples of reverse games in which the aim is to avoid certain cards. Plain-trick games may be divided into the following 11 groups:

- Whist group. A standard Whist pack is used with cards ranking in their natural order and four players playing in partnerships of two. Usually a trump suit is nominated through turning a card or bidding and the aim is to win as many tricks as possible.
- No trump games. As above but there is no trump suit.
- Put group. In Put, tricks are won by the highest card regardless of suit. Treys are usually highest.
- Last trick group. The player who makes the last trick wins (or loses) the hand.
- Trump group. Either trump games in which fewer cards are dealt (e.g. 5) or in which there are chosen suits.
- Ombre group. Ombre introduced one of the two most significant features in the history of card games: bidding. Other common characteristics of this family are 3 matadors and a talon of undealt cards.
- Boston group. Games of the Boston group are played like Whist, but players form alliances of two or three players depending on the outcome of bidding.
- Auction Whist group. Auction or Bid Whist games involved fixed partnerships and an auction to determine the contract to be played.
- Preference group. Games of the Préférence family are typically for three players who are dealt 10 cards each from a 32-card pack and bid to play alone against the other two.
- Exact bidding group. Players bid the exact number of tricks they expect to take and must achieve that to win.
- Multi-trick group. Mostly Oriental games in which several cards may be led to a trick at once. However, some European games of the trump group, such as Bruus, also include this feature.

==== Point-trick games ====
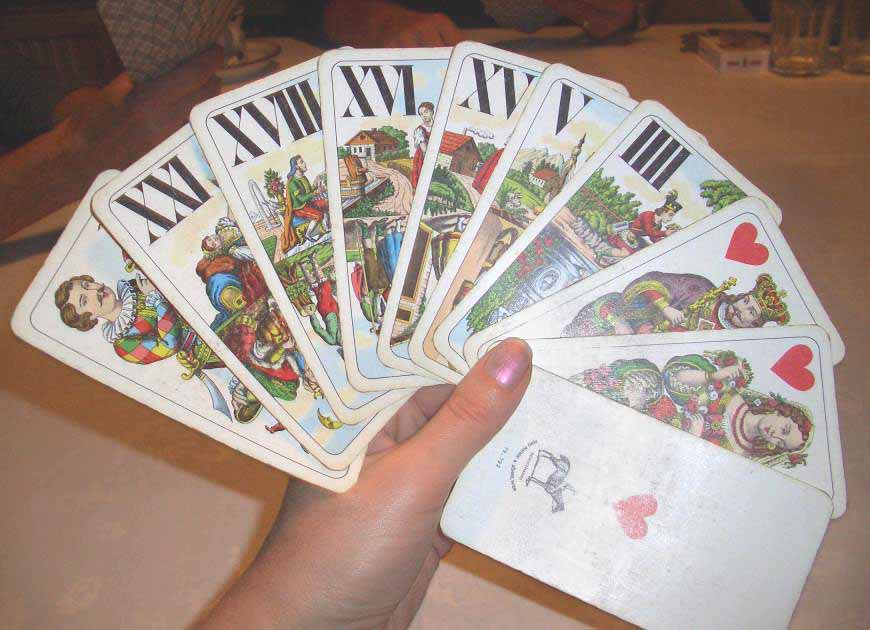
A person holding Austrian-style tarot cards

Point-trick games are all European or of European origin and include the Tarot card games. Individual cards have specific point values and the objective is usually to amass the majority of points by taking tricks, especially those with higher value cards. There are around nine main groups:

- Tarot games. All Tarot games use Tarot cards for their original purpose of playing games and are either French- or Spanish-suited. The tarots form a special trump suit and the counting cards are the highest, second highest and lowest trumps along with the court cards. There are usually bonuses for certain feats or card combinations and most games have multiple contracts which the players may bid for. Notable examples include German Cego, Austrian Tarock, French Tarot and Italian Minchiate.
- Manille group. A small group of mainly French and Spanish games originating in "Malille" characterized by the top card being the 9 in Spanish games or the 10 in Belgian and French games. Additional counters are the AKQJ.
- Couillon group. A small group from the Benelux countries in which the counters and highest cards are the ace (4), king (3), queen (2) and jack (1). A typical member is Luxembourgisch Konter a Matt.
- Trappola group. This family is virtually extinct. Its progenitor, Trappola, was a Venetian game that emerged in the 1500s and was played with a special pack that is still available from Piatnik today. The counters are the ace (6), king (5), knight (4) and jack (3). There were bonuses for certain trick-winning feats.
- All fours group. Based on the old English game of all fours in which there were game points for High (highest trump), Low (lowest trump), Jack (of trumps) and Game (most card points). Surviving members of the group include American Pitch, British Phat and Irish Don.
- Ace–ten games. The ace–ten family includes most of the national games of Europe including German Skat, French Belote, Dutch Klaverjas, Austrian Schnapsen, Spanish Tute, Swiss Jass, Portuguese Sueca, Italian Briscola and Czech Mariáš. Pinochle is an American example of French or Swiss origin. Ace–ten games may be further subdivided into the Schafkopf group, marriage group (which includes the Jass group), the Sedma group and the German Tarok group (which includes American games like frog and six-bid solo.
- Tresette group. Tressette is an Italian game with the odd card ranking of 32AKQJ7654. Aces count 1 point, treys, deuces and courts are worth 1/3 point each. Most are Italian variants of Tressette, but Les Quatre Sept is played in Canada.
- Reverse games. Historically the most significant was Reversis, now rarely played. The best known reverse game today is Black Lady, often called Hearts although that name also refers to a simpler reverse game. Reverse games often feature in compendium games.
- Miscellaneous games. These include small families of Oriental games such as the King-Ten-Five group, in which the counters are the kings and tens (10 each) and fives (5), and Picture group, in which the AKQJT are worth 1 point each and in which Elfern is the only Western example. Of historical interest are Gleek and Penneech, while Cucco is one played with a special Cucco pack.

=== Beating games ===
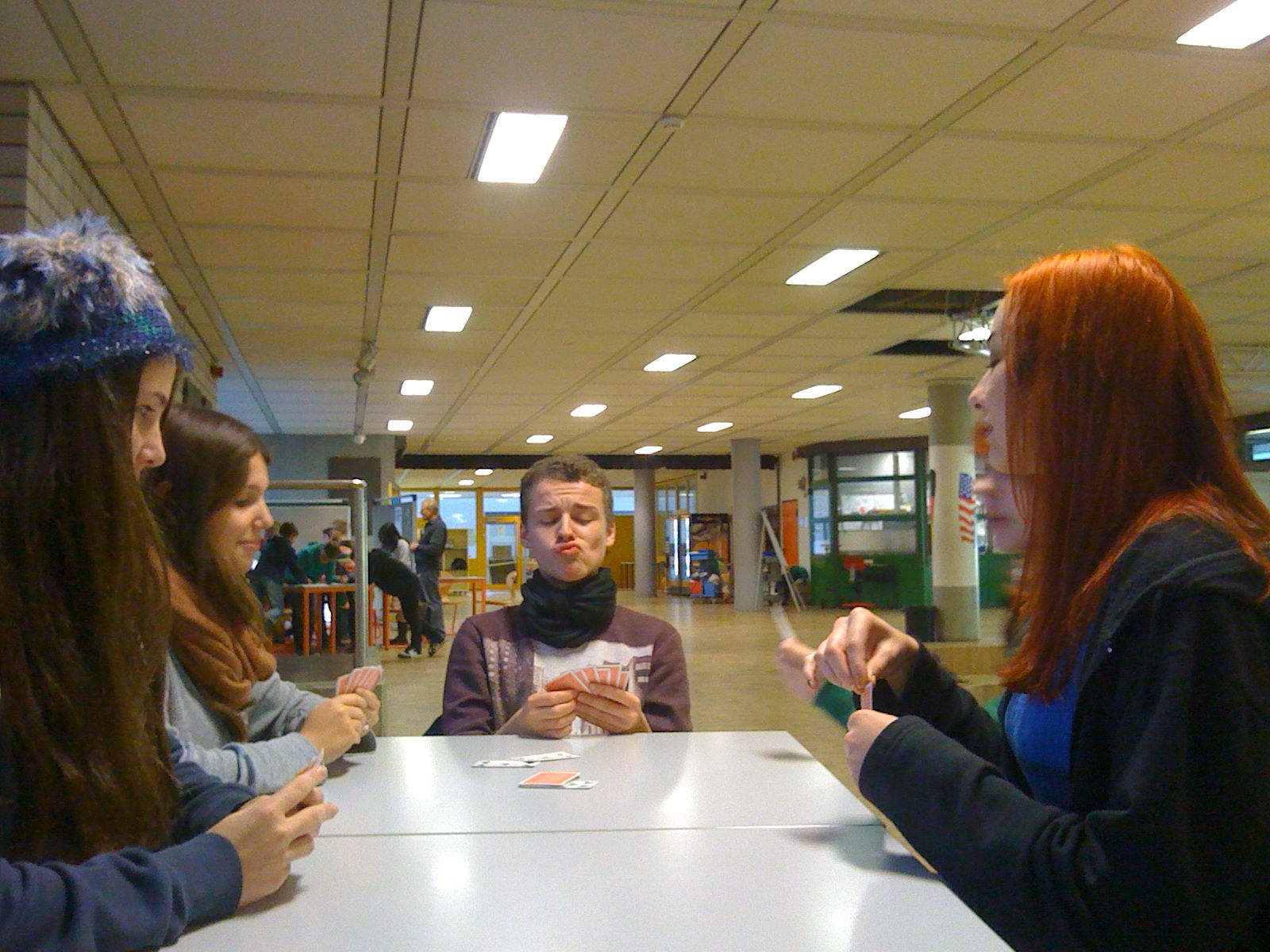
People playing durak, a beating and shedding game

In beating games the idea is to beat the card just played if possible, otherwise it must be picked up, either alone or together with other cards, and added to the hand. In many beating games the objective is to shed all one's cards, in which case they are also "shedding games". Well known examples include Crazy Eights, Mau Mau, Durak, and Skitgubbe.

=== Adding games ===
This is a small group whose ancestor is Noddy, now extinct, but which generated the far more complex games of Costly Colours and Cribbage. Players play in turn and add the values of the cards as they go. The aim is to reach or avoid certain totals and also to score for certain combinations.

=== Fishing games ===
In fishing games, cards from the hand are played against cards in a layout on the table, capturing table cards if they match. Fishing games are popular in many nations, including China, where there are many diverse fishing games. Scopa is considered one of the national card games of Italy. Cassino is the only fishing game to be widely played in English-speaking countries. Zwicker has been described as a "simpler and jollier version of Cassino", played in Germany. Tablanet (tablić) is a fishing-style game popular in Balkans.

=== Matching games ===
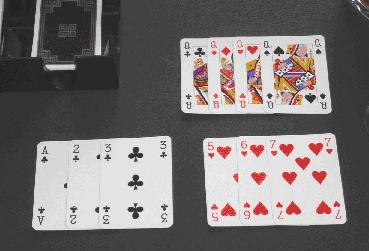
In gin rummy, players assemble groups of the same rank, or runs within a suit

The object of a matching (or sometimes "melding") game is to acquire particular groups of matching cards before an opponent can do so. In Rummy, this is done through drawing and discarding, and the groups are called melds. Mahjong is a very similar game played with tiles instead of cards. Non-Rummy examples of match-type games generally fall into the "fishing" genre and include the children's games Go Fish and Old Maid.

=== War group ===
In games of the war group, also called "catch and collect games" or "accumulating games", the object is to acquire all cards in the deck. Examples include most War type games, and games involving slapping a discard pile such as Slapjack. Egyptian Ratscrew has both of these features.

=== Climbing games ===
Climbing games are an Oriental family in which the idea is to play a higher card or combination of cards than the one just played. Alternatively a player must pass or may choose to pass even if able to beat. The sole Western example is the game of President, which is probably derived from an Asian game.

== Card exchange games ==
Card exchange games form another large category in which players exchange a card or cards from their hands with table cards or with other players with the aim, typically, of collecting specific cards or card combinations. Games of the rummy family are the best known.

=== Draw and discard group ===
In these games players draw a card from stock, make a move if possible or desired, and then discard a card to a discard pile. Almost all the games of this group are in the rummy family, but Golf is a non-rummy example.

=== Commerce group ===
As the name might suggest, players exchange hand cards with a common pool of cards on the table. Examples include Schwimmen, Kemps, James Bond and Whisky Poker. They originated in the old European games of Thirty-One and Commerce.

=== Cuckoo group ===
A very old round game played in different forms in different countries. Players are dealt just one card and may try and swap it with a neighbor to avoid having the lowest card or, sometimes, certain penalty cards. The old French game is Coucou and its later English cousin is Ranter Go Round, also called Chase the Ace and Screw Your Neighbour.

A family of such games played with special cards includes Italian Cucù, Scandinavian Gnav, Austrian Hexenspiel and German Vogelspiel.

=== Quartet group ===
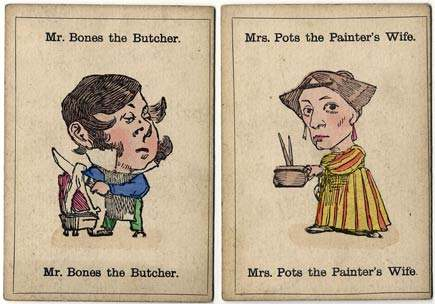
Happy Families cards

Games involving collecting sets of cards, the best known of which is Happy Families. Highly successful is its German equivalent, Quartett, which may be played with a Skat pack, but is much more commonly played with proprietary packs.

=== Card passing group ===
Games involving passing cards to your neighbors. The classic game is Old Maid which may, however, be derived from German Black Peter and related to the French game of Vieux Garçon. Pig, with its variations of Donkey and Spoons, is also popular.

== Layout games ==
=== Patience or solitaire games ===
Most patience or card solitaire games are designed to be played by one player, but some are designed for two or more players to compete.

==== Single player patiences or solitaires ====
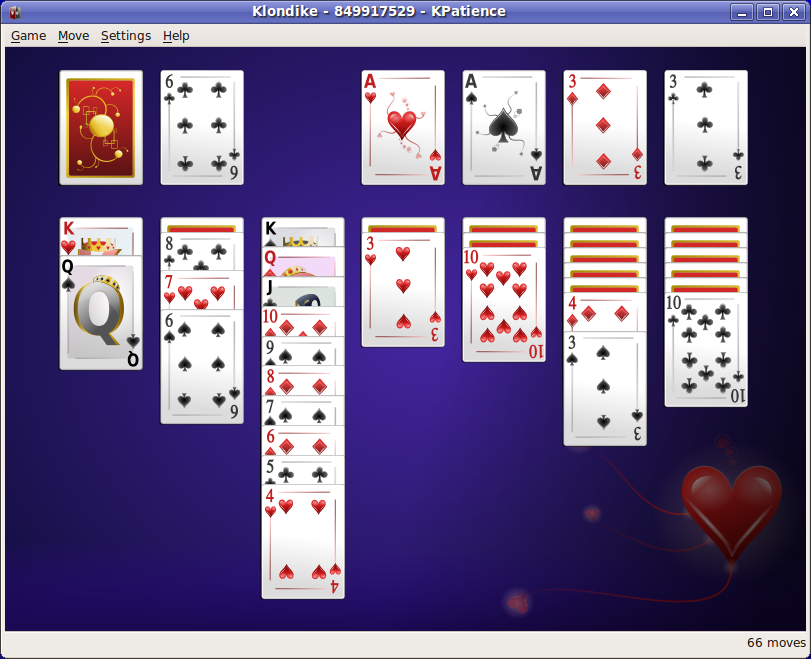
Digital Klondike solitaire

Patience games originated in northern Europe and were designed for a single player, hence its subsequent North American name of solitaire. Most games begin with a specific layout of cards, called a tableau, and the object is then either to construct a more elaborate final layout, or to clear the tableau and/or the draw pile or stock by moving all cards to one or more discard or foundation piles.

==== Competitive patiences ====
In competitive patiences, two or more players compete to be first to complete a patience or solitaire-like tableau. Some use a common layout; in others each player has a separate layout. Popular examples include Spite and Malice, Racing Demon or Nerts, Spit, Speed and Russian Bank.

=== Connecting games ===
The most common of these is Card Dominoes also known as Fan Tan or Parliament in which the idea is to build the four suits in sequence from a central card (the 7 in 52-card games or the Unter in 32-card packs). The winner is the first out and the loser the last left in holding cards.

== Hand comparison games ==
Hand comparison games, also called comparing card games, are mostly gambling games that use cards. Players lay their initial stakes, are dealt cards, may or may not be able to exchange or add to them, and may or may not be able to raise their stakes, and the outcome is decided by some form of comparison of card values or combinations. The main groups are vying and banking games. A smaller mainly Oriental group are partition games in which players divide their hands before comparing.

=== Vying games ===
Vying games, are those in which players bet or "vie" on who has the best hand. The player with the best combination of hand cards in a "showdown", or the player able to bluff the others into folding, wins the hand. Easily the best known of the group around the world is Poker, which itself is a family of games with over 100 variants. Other examples include English Brag and the old Basque game of Mus. Most may be classified as gambling games and, while they may involve skill in terms of bluffing and memorizing and assessing odds, they involve little or no card playing skill.

==== Poker games ====
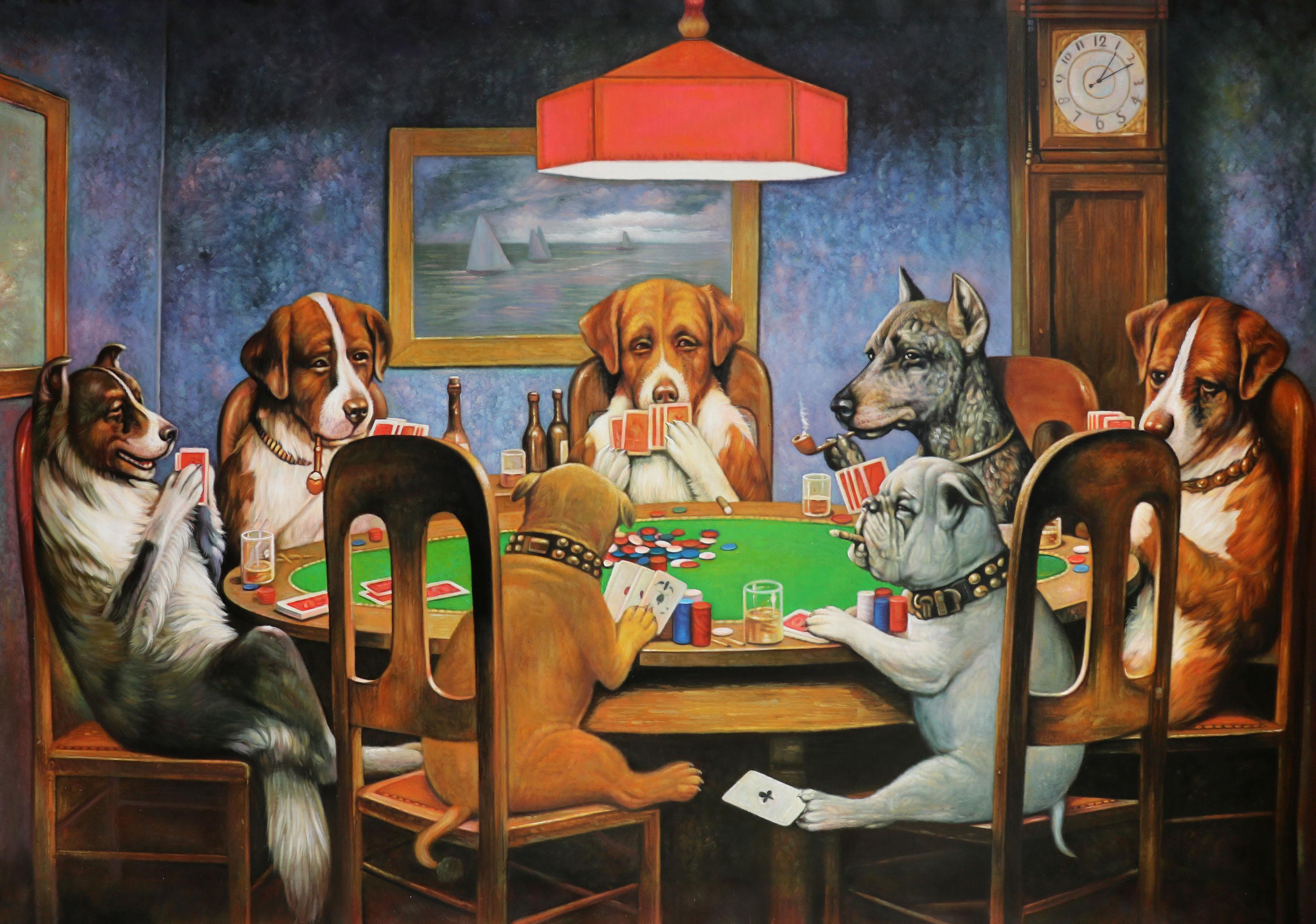
A Friend in Need, from the Dogs Playing Poker series by C. M. Coolidge

Poker is a family of gambling games in which players bet into a pool, called the pot, the value of which changes as the game progresses that the value of the hand they carry will beat all others according to the ranking system. Variants largely differ on how cards are dealt and the methods by which players can improve a hand. For many reasons, including its age and its popularity among Western militaries, it is one of the most universally known card games in existence.

=== Banking games ===
These are gambling games played for money or chips in which players compete, not against one another, but against a banker. They are commonly played in casinos, but many have become domesticized, played at home for sweets, matchsticks or points. In casino games, the banker will have a 'house advantage' that ensures a profit for the casino. Popular casino games include Blackjack and Baccarat, while Pontoon is a cousin of Blackjack that emerged from the trenches of the First World War to become a popular British family game.

== Miscellaneous games ==
These games do not fit into any of the foregoing categories. The only traditional games in this group are the compendium games, which date back at least 200 years, and Speculation, a 19th-century trading game.

=== Compendium games ===
Compendium games consist of a sequence of different contracts played in succession. A common pattern is for a number of reverse deals to be played, in which the aim is to avoid certain cards, followed by a final contract which is a domino-type game. Examples include: Barbu, Herzeln, Lorum and Rosbiratschka. In other games, such as Quodlibet and Rumpel, there is a range of widely varying contracts.

=== Combat games ===
A new genre not recorded before 1970, most of which use proprietary cards of the collectible card game type (see below). The earliest example is Cuttle and the best known is Magic: The Gathering. Pokemon is another famous example. It is a genre that has become popular in indie gameplay, with games like Yomi, Mage Knight, and Slay the Spire.

== Card games by objective ==
Another broad way of classifying card games is by objective. There are four main types as well as a handful of games that have miscellaneous objectives.

=== Capturing games ===
In these games the objective is to capture cards or to avoid capturing them. These break down into the following:

- Most cards. The aim is to capture as many cards as possible. Most plain trick games fall into this group.
- Fewest cards. Common in compendium games, otherwise rare. Often occurs as a contract within a game known as a Misère, Bettel, Null or Nolo.
- Exact number of cards. To win games of the exact bidding group a player must take the exact number of tricks bid.
- Most points. In point-trick games and most fishing games, the aim is to capture the most points in cards.
- Fewest points. Some or all cards incur penalty points and so the aim is to capture as few points as possible.
- Exact points. A small group in which players aim to score a specific number of points e.g. Differenzler Jass.
- Most or fewest points. In some Jass games e.g. Molotov, the aim is to secure either the most or fewest points, leaving the player in the middle as the loser.
- Win last trick. In games like Tuppen, the player who takes the last trick wins; all earlier tricks are irrelevant. Some games also have a bonus or extra points for winning the last trick or winning it with a specific card.
- Lose last trick. In a few games, e.g. Krypkille, the aim is to lose the last trick.
- Mixed objectives. Some games, e.g. Kaiser, have both positive and negative point cards.

=== Shedding games ===
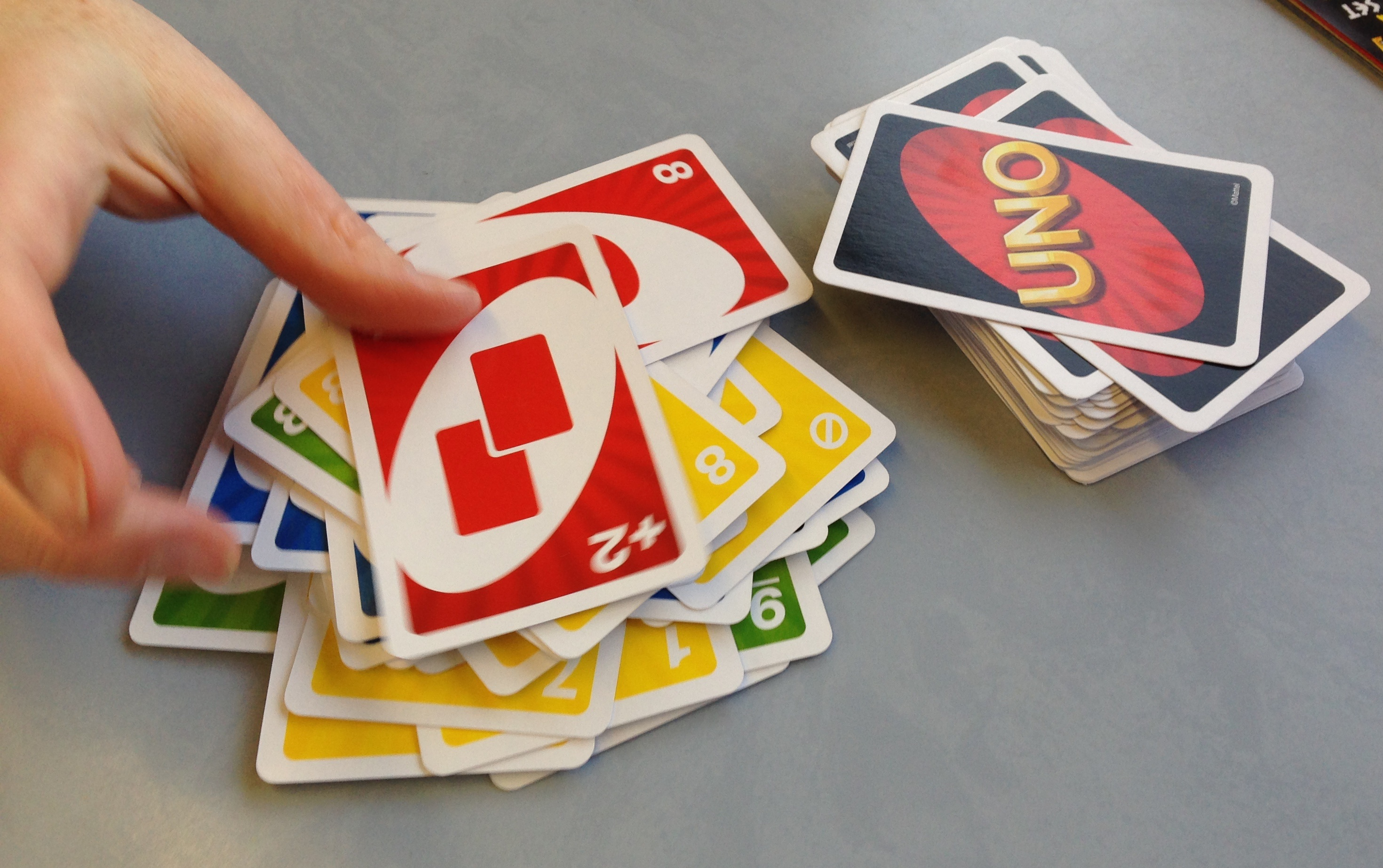
Uno is a popular commercial shedding game

In a shedding game, also called an accumulating game, players start with a hand of cards, and the object of the game is to be the first player to discard all cards from one's hand. Common shedding games include Crazy Eights (commercialized by Mattel as Uno) and Daihinmin. Similar games are Switch, Mau Mau or Whot!. Some matching-type games are also shedding-type games; some variants of Rummy such as Paskahousu, Phase 10, Rummikub, the bluffing game I Doubt It, and the children's games Musta Maija and Old Maid, fall into both categories.

=== Combination games ===
In many games, the aim is to form combinations of cards: by addition, by matching sets or forming sequences. All Rummy games are based on the last two principles, although in the basic variants, the end objective is to shed cards which makes them shedding games (see above). However, meld scoring variants such as Canasta or Rommé are true combination games.

=== Comparing games ===
Comparing card games are those where hand values are compared to determine the winner, also known as "vying" or "showdown" games. Poker, blackjack, mus, and baccarat are examples of comparing card games. As seen, nearly all of these games are designed as gambling games.

== Drinking games ==
Drinking card games are drinking games using cards, in which the object in playing the game is either to drink or to force others to drink. Many games are ordinary card games with the establishment of "drinking rules"; President, for instance, is virtually identical to Daihinmin but with additional rules governing drinking. Poker can also be played using a number of drinks as the wager. Another game often played as a drinking game is Toepen, quite popular in the Netherlands. Some card games are designed specifically to be played as drinking games.

== Proprietary games ==
These are card games played with a dedicated deck. Many other card games have been designed and published on a commercial or amateur basis. In a few cases, the game uses the standard 52-card deck, but the object is unique. In Eleusis, for example, players play single cards, and are told whether the play was legal or illegal, in an attempt to discover the underlying rules made up by the dealer.

Most of these games however typically use a specially made deck of cards designed specifically for the game (or variations of it). The decks are thus usually proprietary, but may be created by the game's players. Uno, Phase 10, Set, and 1000 Blank White Cards are popular dedicated-deck card games; 1000 Blank White Cards is unique in that the cards for the game are designed by the players of the game while playing it; there is no commercially available deck advertised as such.

=== Collectible card games (CCGs) ===
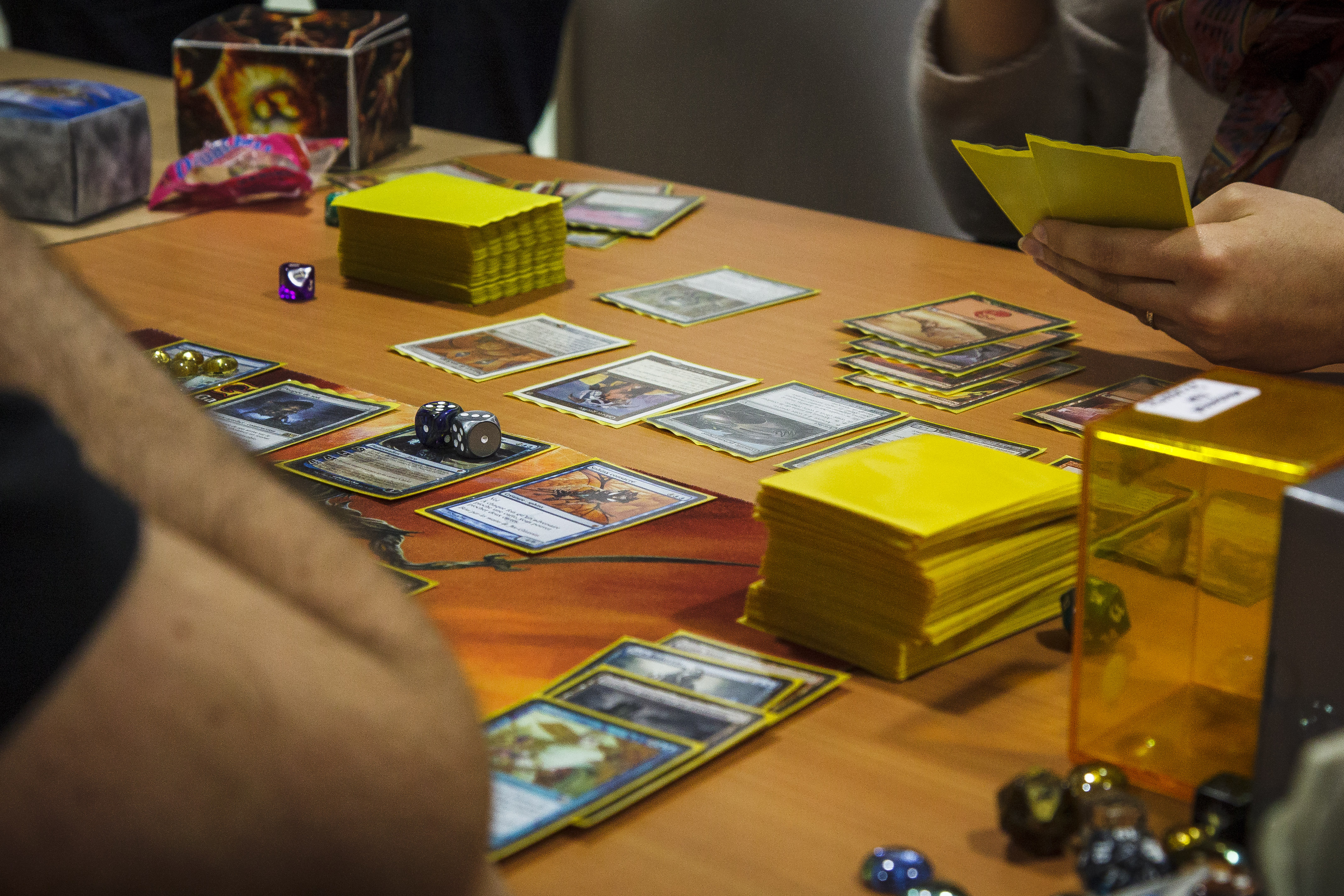
People playing Magic: The Gathering

Collectible card games (CCG) are proprietary playing card games. CCGs are games of strategy between two or more players. Each player has their own deck constructed from a very large pool of unique cards in the commercial market. The cards have different effects, costs, and art. New card sets are released periodically and sold as starter decks or booster packs. Obtaining the different cards makes the game a collectible card game, and cards are sold or traded on the secondary market. Magic: The Gathering, Pokémon, and Yu-Gi-Oh! are well-known collectible card games.

=== Living card games (LCGs) ===
Living card games (LCGs) are similar to collectible card games (CCGs), with their most distinguishing feature being a fixed distribution method, which breaks away from the traditional collectible card game format. While new cards for CCGs are usually sold in the form of starter decks or booster packs (the latter being often randomized), LCGs thrive on a model that requires players to acquire one core set in order to play the game, which players can further customize by acquiring extra sets or expansions featuring new content in the form of cards or scenarios. No randomization is involved in the process, thus players that get the same sets or expansions will get the exact same content. The term was popularized by Fantasy Flight Games (FFG) and mainly applies to its products, however some tabletop gaming companies can be seen using a very similar model.

=== Simulation card games ===
A deck of either customized dedicated cards or a standard deck of playing cards with assigned meanings is used to simulate the actions of another activity, for example card football.

== Fictional card games ==
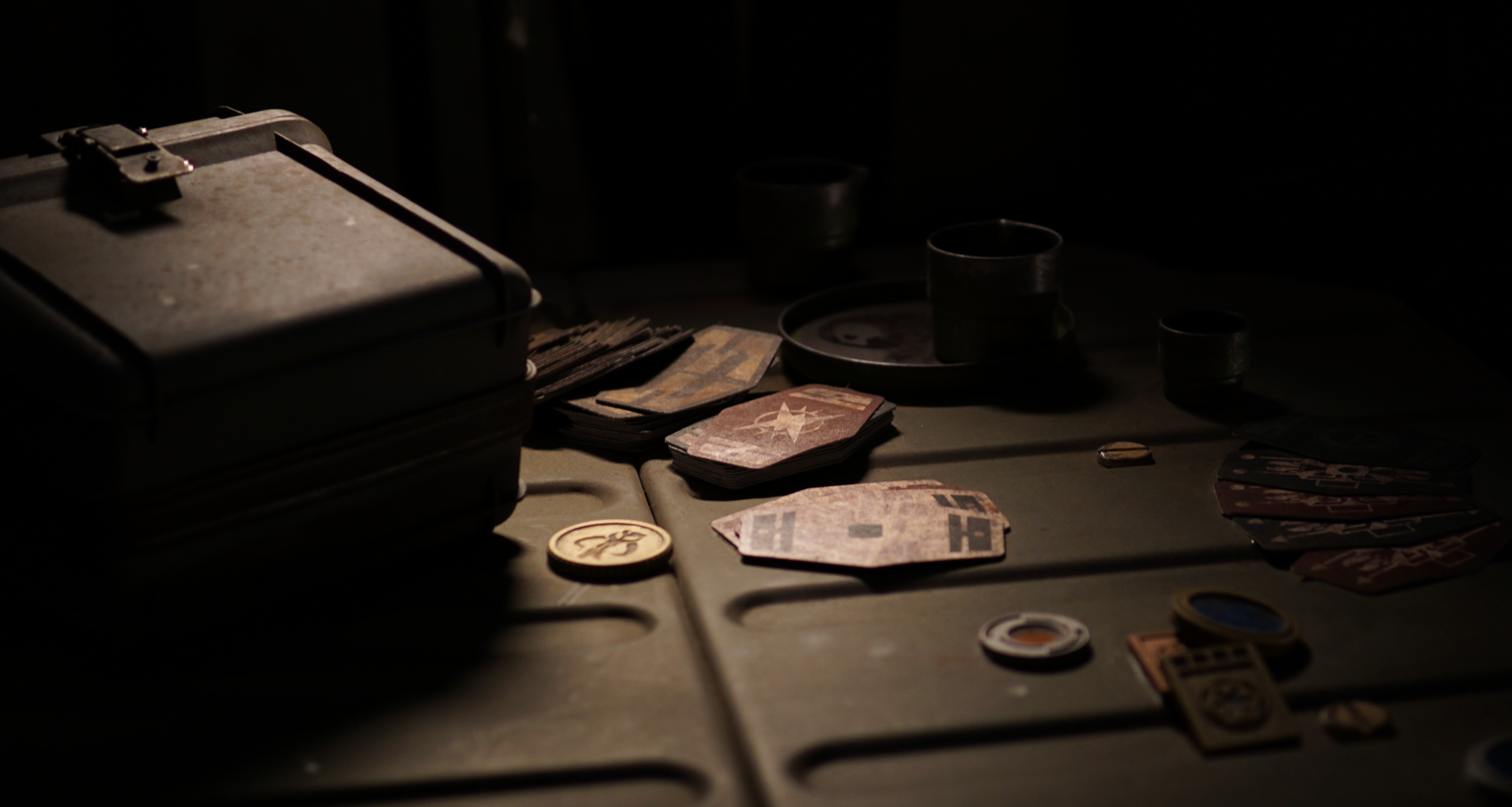
Sabacc at Star Wars: Galaxy's Edge.

Many games, including card games, are fabricated by science fiction authors and screenwriters to distance a culture depicted in the story from present-day Western culture. They are commonly used as filler to depict background activities in an atmosphere like a bar or rec room, but sometimes the drama revolves around the play of the game. Some of these games become real card games as the holder of the intellectual property develops and markets a suitable deck and ruleset for the game, while others lack sufficient descriptions of rules, or depend on cards or other hardware that are infeasible or physically impossible.

== Typical structure of card games ==
=== Number and association of players ===
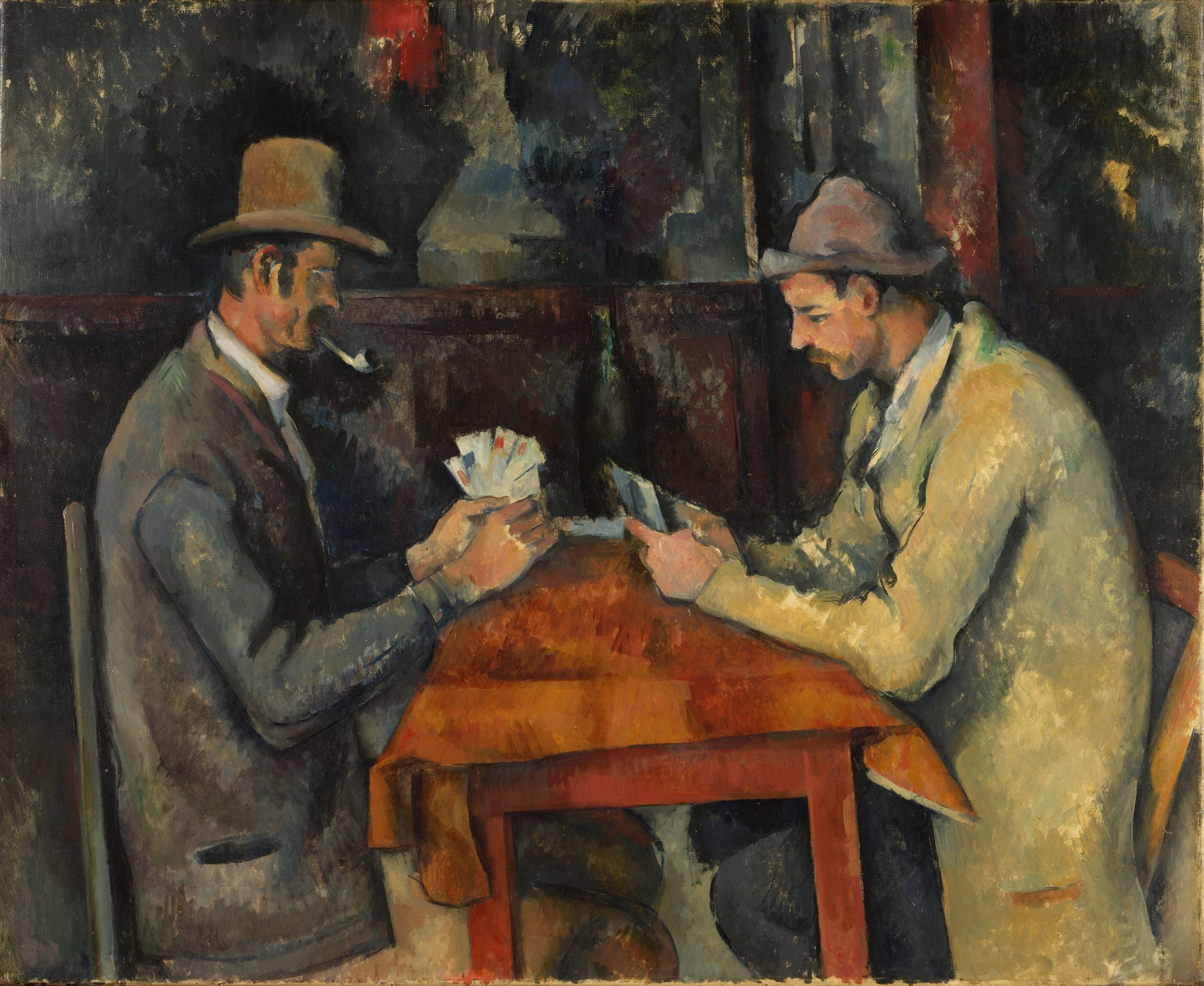
The Card Players, 1895 by Paul Cézanne

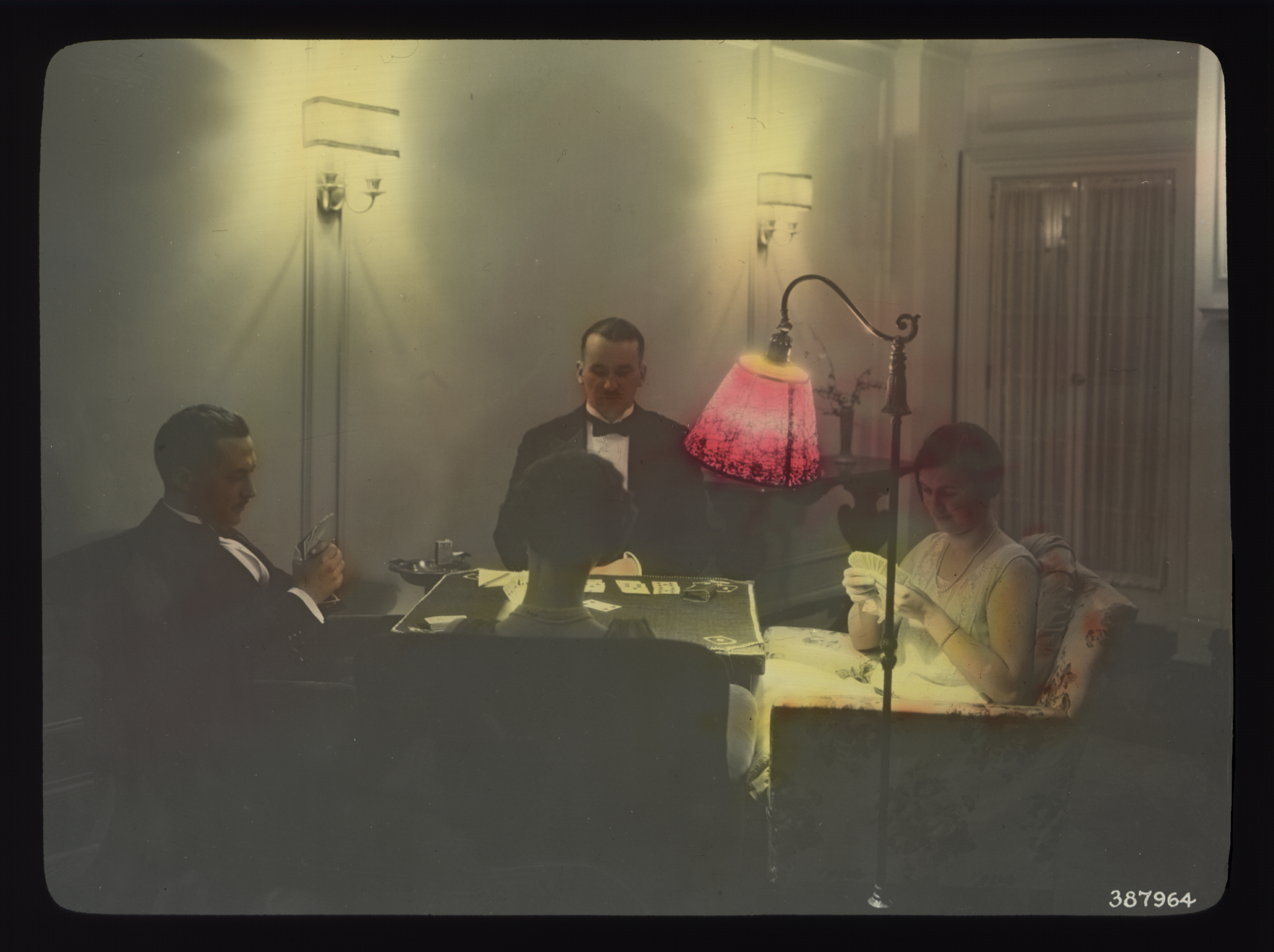
Historically, card games such as whist and contract bridge were opportunities for quiet socializing, as shown in this 1930s magic lantern slide photo taken in Seattle, Washington.

Any specific card game imposes restrictions on the number of players. The most significant dividing lines run between one-player games and two-player games, and between two-player games and multi-player games. Card games for one player are known as solitaire or patience card games. (See List of solitaire card games.) Generally speaking, they are in many ways special and atypical, although some of them have given rise to two- or multi-player games such as Spite and Malice.

In card games for two players, usually not all cards are distributed to the players, as they would otherwise have perfect information about the game state. Two-player games have always been immensely popular and include some of the most significant card games such as piquet, bezique, sixty-six, klaberjass, gin rummy and cribbage. Many multi-player games started as two-player games that were adapted to a greater number of players. For such adaptations a number of non-obvious choices must be made beginning with the choice of a game orientation.

One way of extending a two-player game to more players is by building two teams of equal size. A common case is four players in two fixed partnerships, sitting crosswise as in whist and contract bridge. Partners sit opposite to each other and cannot see each other's hands. If communication between the partners is allowed at all, then it is usually restricted to a specific list of permitted signs and signals. 17th-century French partnership games such as triomphe were special in that partners sat next to each other and were allowed to communicate freely so long as they did not exchange cards or play out of order.

Another way of extending a two-player game to more players is as a cut-throat or individual game, in which all players play for themselves, and win or lose alone. Most such card games are round games, i.e. they can be played by any number of players starting from two or three, so long as there are enough cards for all.

For some of the most interesting games such as ombre, tarot and skat, the associations between players change from hand to hand. Ultimately players all play on their own, but for each hand, some game mechanism divides the players into two teams. Most typically these are solo games, i.e. games in which one player becomes the soloist and has to achieve some objective against the others, who form a team and win or lose all their points jointly. But in games for more than three players, there may also be a mechanism that selects two players who then have to play against the others.

=== Direction of play ===
The players of a card game normally form a circle around a table or other space that can hold cards. The game orientation or direction of play, which is only relevant for three or more players, can be either clockwise or counterclockwise. It is the direction in which various roles in the game proceed. (In real-time card games, there may be no need for a direction of play.) Most regions have a traditional direction of play, such as:

- Counterclockwise in most of Asia and in Latin America.
- Clockwise in North America and Australia.

Europe is roughly divided into a clockwise area in the north and a counterclockwise area in the south. The boundary runs between England, Ireland, Netherlands, Germany, Austria (mostly), Slovakia, Ukraine and Russia (clockwise) and France, Switzerland, Spain, Italy, Slovenia, Balkans, Hungary, Romania, Bulgaria, Greece and Turkey (counterclockwise).

Games that originate in a region with a strong preference are often initially played in the original direction, even in regions that prefer the opposite direction. For games that have official rules and are played in tournaments, the direction of play is often prescribed in those rules.

=== Determining who deals ===
Most games have some form of asymmetry between players. The roles of players are normally expressed in terms of the dealer, i.e. the player whose task it is to shuffle the cards and distribute them to the players. Being the dealer can be a (minor or major) advantage or disadvantage, depending on the game. Therefore, after each played hand, the deal normally passes to the next player according to the game orientation.

As it can still be an advantage or disadvantage to be the first dealer, there are some standard methods for determining who is the first dealer. A common method is by cutting, which works as follows. One player shuffles the deck and places it on the table. Each player lifts a packet of cards from the top, reveals its bottom card, and returns it to the deck. The player who reveals the highest (or lowest) card becomes dealer. In the case of a tie, the process is repeated by the tied players. For some games such as whist this process of cutting is part of the official rules, and the hierarchy of cards for the purpose of cutting (which need not be the same as that used otherwise in the game) is also specified. But in general, any method can be used, such as tossing a coin in case of a two-player game, drawing cards until one player draws an ace, or rolling dice.

=== Hands, rounds and games ===
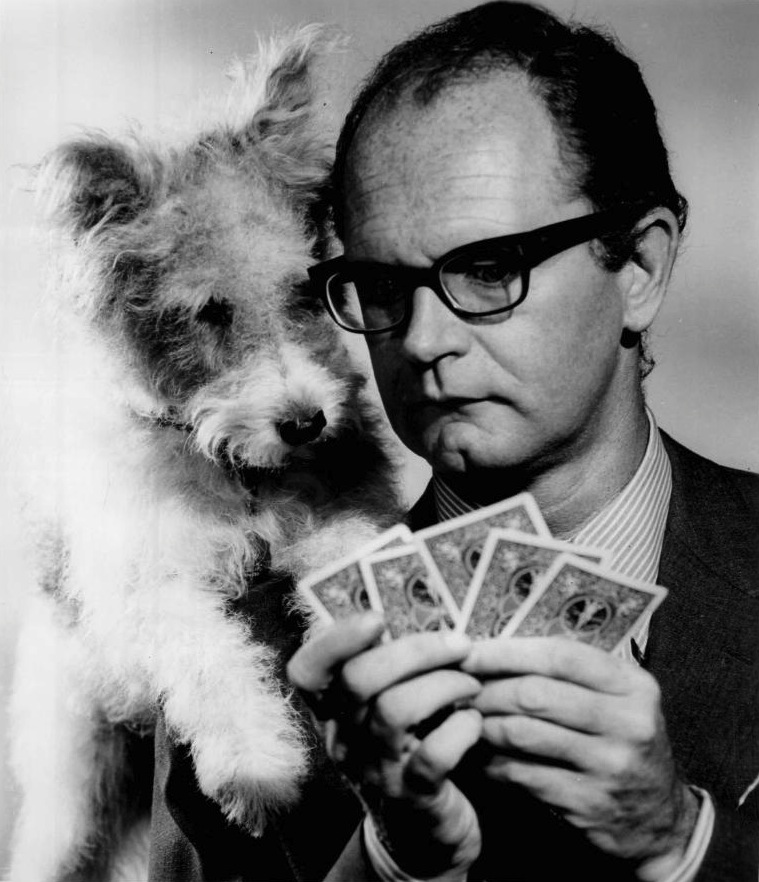
Charles Nelson Reilly holds a hand of cards

A hand, also called a deal, is a unit of the game that begins with the dealer shuffling and dealing the cards as described below, and ends with the players scoring and the next dealer being determined. The set of cards that each player receives and holds in his or her hands is also known as that player's hand.

The hand is over when the players have finished playing their hands. Most often this occurs when one player (or all) has no cards left. The player who sits after the dealer in the direction of play is known as eldest hand (or in two-player games as elder hand) or forehand. A game round consists of as many hands as there are players. After each hand, the deal is passed on in the direction of play, i.e. the previous eldest hand becomes the new dealer. Normally players score points after each hand. A game may consist of a fixed number of rounds. Alternatively it can be played for a fixed number of points. In this case it is over with the hand in which a player reaches the target score.

=== Shuffling ===
A person performing a standard riffle shuffle

Shuffling is the process of bringing the cards of a pack into a random order. There are a large number of techniques with various advantages and disadvantages. Riffle shuffling is a method in which the deck is divided into two roughly equal-sized halves that are bent and then released, so that the cards interlace. Repeating this process several times randomizes the deck well, but the method is harder to learn than some others and may damage the cards. The overhand shuffle and the Hindu shuffle are two techniques that work by taking batches of cards from the top of the deck and reassembling them in the opposite order. They are easier to learn but must be repeated more to sufficiently randomize the deck. A method suitable for small children consists in spreading the cards on a large surface and moving them around before picking up the deck again. This is also the most common method for shuffling tiles such as dominoes.

For casino games that are played for large sums it is vital that the cards be properly randomized, but for many games this is less critical, and in fact player experience can suffer when the cards are shuffled too well. The official skat rules stipulate that the cards are shuffled well, but according to a decision of the German skat court, a one-handed player should ask another player to do the shuffling, rather than use a shuffling machine, as it would shuffle the cards too well. French belote rules go so far as to prescribe that the deck never be shuffled between hands.

=== Dealing ===
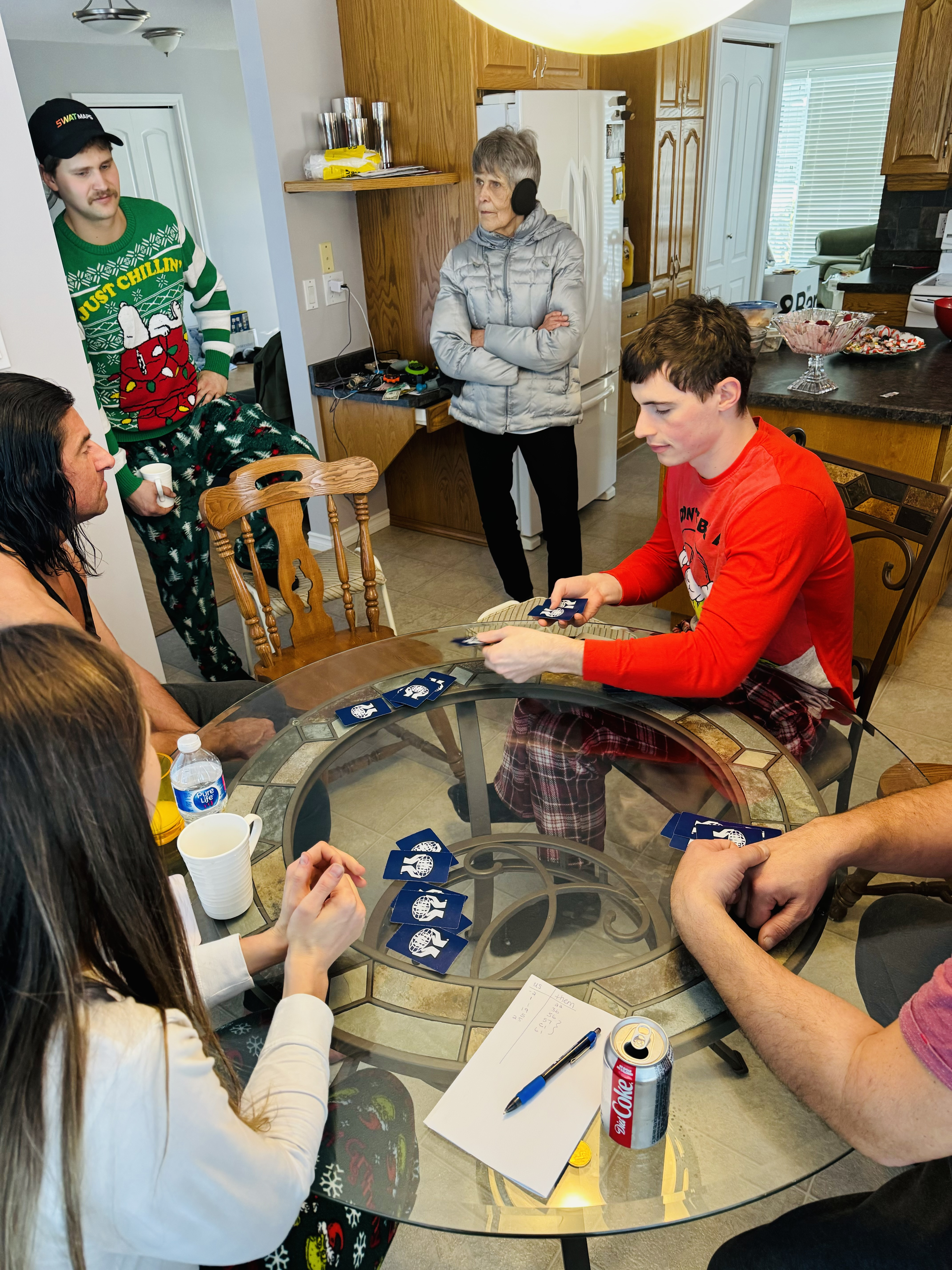
A man dealing cards to the other players before a game

The dealer takes all of the cards in the pack, arranges them so that they are in a uniform stack, and shuffles them. In strict play, the dealer then offers the deck to the previous player (in the sense of the game direction) for cutting. If the deal is clockwise, this is the player to the dealer's right; if counterclockwise, it is the player to the dealer's left. The invitation to cut is made by placing the pack, face downward, on the table near the player who is to cut: who then lifts the upper portion of the pack clear of the lower portion and places it alongside. (Normally the two portions have about equal size. Strict rules often indicate that each portion must contain a certain minimum number of cards, such as three or five.) The formerly lower portion is then replaced on top of the formerly upper portion. Instead of cutting, one may also knock on the deck to indicate that one trusts the dealer to have shuffled fairly.

The actual deal (distribution of cards) is done in the direction of play, beginning with eldest hand. The dealer holds the pack, face down, in one hand, and removes cards from the top of it with his or her other hand to distribute to the players, placing them face down on the table in front of the players to whom they are dealt. The cards may be dealt one at a time, or in batches of more than one card; and either the entire pack or a determined number of cards are dealt out. The undealt cards, if any, are left face down in the middle of the table, forming the stock (also called the talon, widow, skat or kitty depending on the game and region).

Throughout the shuffle, cut, and deal, the dealer should prevent the players from seeing the faces of any of the cards. The players should not try to see any of the faces. Should a player accidentally see a card, other than one's own, proper etiquette would be to admit this. It is also dishonest to try to see cards as they are dealt, or to take advantage of having seen a card. Should a card accidentally become exposed, (visible to all), any player can demand a redeal (all the cards are gathered up, and the shuffle, cut, and deal are repeated) or that the card be replaced randomly into the deck ("burning" it) and a replacement dealt from the top to the player who was to receive the revealed card.

When the deal is complete, all players pick up their cards, or "hand", and hold them in such a way that the faces can be seen by the holder of the cards but not the other players, or vice versa depending on the game. It is helpful to fan one's cards out so that if they have corner indices all their values can be seen at once. In most games, it is also useful to sort one's hand, rearranging the cards in a way appropriate to the game. For example, in a trick-taking game it may be easier to have all one's cards of the same suit together, whereas in a rummy game one might sort them by rank or by potential combinations.

== Signalling ==
Normally communication between partners about tactics or the cards in their hands is forbidden. However, in a small number of games communication and/or signaling is permitted and very much part of the play. Most of these games are very old and, often, have rules of play that allow any card to be played at any time. Such games include:

- Karnöffel, the oldest card game in Europe still played in some form today, played with German-suited cards, and its surviving descendants:
  - Knüffeln (north Germany) and Styrivolt (Faroes) played with 48 French-suited cards
  - Kaiserspiel, Swiss game with a Swiss-suited pack of 48 cards
- Mus, a Basque game known since the 18th century, played with a Spanish deck of forty cards;
- Brisca, a Spanish game adapted from the French Brisque, is played with a Spanish pack of forty cards;
- Watten, a Bavarian and Austrian game, is played with 36 German-suited cards;
- Perlaggen, a Tyrolean game played with 33 German-suited cards;
- Truc y Flou, a card game of Aragonese origin.
- Trut or Truc, reported in the west of France from the 16th century, also known in Catalonia and South America (as Truco).

== Rules ==
A new card game starts in a small way, either as someone's invention, or as a modification of an existing game. Those playing it may agree to change the rules as they wish. The rules that they agree on become the "house rules" under which they play the game. A set of house rules may be accepted as valid by a group of players wherever they play, as it may also be accepted as governing all play within a particular house, café, or club.

When a game becomes sufficiently popular, so that people often play it with strangers, there is a need for a generally accepted set of rules. This need is often met when a particular set of house rules becomes generally recognized. For example, when Whist became popular in 18th-century England, players in the Portland Club agreed on a set of house rules for use on its premises. Players in some other clubs then agreed to follow the "Portland Club" rules, rather than go to the trouble of codifying and printing their own sets of rules. The Portland Club rules eventually became generally accepted throughout England and Western cultures.

There is nothing static or "official" about this process. For the majority of games, there is no one set of universal rules by which the game is played, and the most common ruleset is no more or less than that. Many widely played card games, such as Canasta and Pinochle, have no official regulating body. The most common ruleset is often determined by the most popular distribution of rulebooks for card games. Perhaps the original compilation of popular playing card games was collected by Edmund Hoyle, a self-made authority on many popular parlor games. The U.S. Playing Card Company now owns the eponymous Hoyle brand, and publishes a series of rulebooks for various families of card games that have largely standardized the games' rules in countries and languages where the rulebooks are widely distributed. However, players are free to, and often do, invent "house rules" to supplement or even largely replace the "standard" rules.

If there is a sense in which a card game can have an official set of rules, it is when that card game has an "official" governing body. For example, the rules of tournament bridge are governed by the World Bridge Federation, and by local bodies in various countries such as the American Contract Bridge League in the U.S., and the English Bridge Union in England. The rules of skat are governed by The International Skat Players Association and, in Germany, by the Deutscher Skatverband which publishes the Skatordnung. The rules of French tarot are governed by the Fédération Française de Tarot. The rules of Schafkopf are laid down by the Schafkopfschule in Munich. Even in these cases, the rules must only be followed at games sanctioned by these governing bodies or where the tournament organisers specify them. Players in informal settings are free to implement agreed supplemental or substitute rules. For example, in Schafkopf there are numerous local variants sometimes known as "impure" Schafkopf and specified by assuming the official rules and describing the additions e.g. "with Geier and Bettel, tariff 5/10 cents".

=== Rule infractions ===
An infraction is any action which is against the rules of the game, such as playing a card when it is not one's turn to play or the accidental exposure of a card, informally known as "bleeding."

In many official sets of rules for card games, the rules specifying the penalties for various infractions occupy more pages than the rules specifying how to play correctly. This is tedious but necessary for games that are played seriously. Players who intend to play a card game at a high level generally ensure before beginning that all agree on the penalties to be used. When playing privately, this will normally be a question of agreeing house rules. In a tournament, there will probably be a tournament director who will enforce the rules when required and arbitrate in cases of doubt.

If a player breaks the rules of a game deliberately, this is cheating. The rest of this section is therefore about accidental infractions, caused by ignorance, clumsiness, inattention, etc.

As the same game is played repeatedly among a group of players, precedents build up about how a particular infraction of the rules should be handled. For example, "Sheila just led a card when it wasn't her turn. Last week when Jo did that, we agreed ... etc." Sets of such precedents tend to become established among groups of players, and to be regarded as part of the house rules. Sets of house rules may become formalized, as described in the previous section. Therefore, for some games, there is a "proper" way of handling infractions of the rules. But for many games, without governing bodies, there is no standard way of handling infractions.

In many circumstances, there is no need for special rules dealing with what happens after an infraction. As a general principle, the person who broke a rule should not benefit from it, and the other players should not lose by it. An exception to this may be made in games with fixed partnerships, in which it may be felt that the partner(s) of the person who broke a rule should also not benefit. The penalty for an accidental infraction should be as mild as reasonable, consistent with there being a possible benefit to the person responsible.

== Playing cards ==
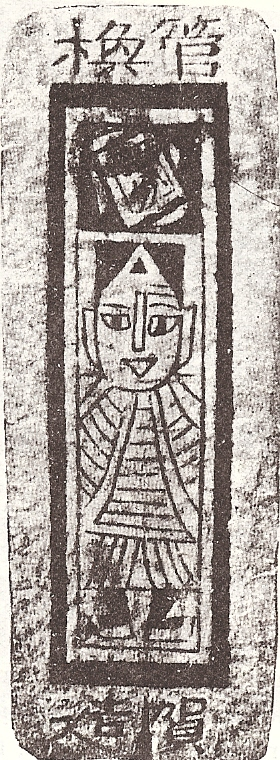
A Chinese playing card dated c. 1400 AD, Ming dynasty

The oldest surviving reference to the card game in world history is from the 9th century China, when the Collection of Miscellanea at Duyang, written by Tang-dynasty writer Su E, described Princess Tongchang (daughter of Emperor Yizong of Tang) playing the "leaf game" with members of the Wei clan (the family of the princess's husband) in 868 . The Song dynasty statesman and historian Ouyang Xiu has noted that paper playing cards arose in connection to an earlier development in the book format from scrolls to pages.

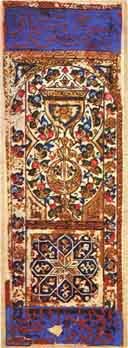
Mamluk playing card (king of cups), c. 15th century

Playing cards first appeared in Europe in the last quarter of the 14th century. The earliest European references speak of a Saracen or Moorish game called naib, and in fact an almost complete Mamluk Egyptian deck of 52 cards in a distinct oriental design has survived from around the same time, with the four suits swords, polo sticks, cups and coins and the ranks king, governor, second governor, and ten to one.

The 1430s in Italy saw the invention of the tarot deck, a full Latin-suited deck augmented by suitless cards with painted motifs that played a special role as trumps. Tarot card games are still played with (subsets of) these decks in parts of Central Europe. A full tarot deck contains 14 cards in each suit; low cards labeled 1–10, and court cards valet (jack), chevalier (cavalier/knight), dame (queen), and roi (king), plus the fool or excuse card, and 21 trump cards. In the 18th century the card images of the traditional Italian tarot decks became popular in cartomancy and evolved into "esoteric" decks used primarily for the purpose; today most tarot decks sold in North America are the occult type, and are closely associated with fortune telling. In Europe, "playing tarot" decks remain popular for games, and have evolved since the 18th century to use regional suits (spades, hearts, diamonds and clubs in France; leaves, hearts, bells and acorns in Germany) as well as other familiar aspects of the English-pattern pack such as corner card indices and "stamped" card symbols for non-court cards. Decks differ regionally based on the number of cards needed to play the games; the French tarot consists of the "full" 78 cards, while Germanic, Spanish and Italian Tarot variants remove certain values (usually low suited cards) from the deck, creating a deck with as few as 32 cards.

The French suits were introduced around 1480 and, in France, mostly replaced the earlier Latin suits of swords, clubs, cups and coins. (which are still common in Spanish- and Portuguese-speaking countries as well as in some northern regions of Italy) The suit symbols, being very simple and single-color, could be stamped onto the playing cards to create a deck, thus only requiring special full-color card art for the court cards. This drastically simplifies the production of a deck of cards versus the traditional Italian deck, which used unique full-color art for each card in the deck. The French suits became popular in English playing cards in the 16th century (despite historic animosity between France and England), and from there were introduced to British colonies including North America. The rise of Western culture has led to the near-universal popularity and availability of French-suited playing cards even in areas with their own regional card art.

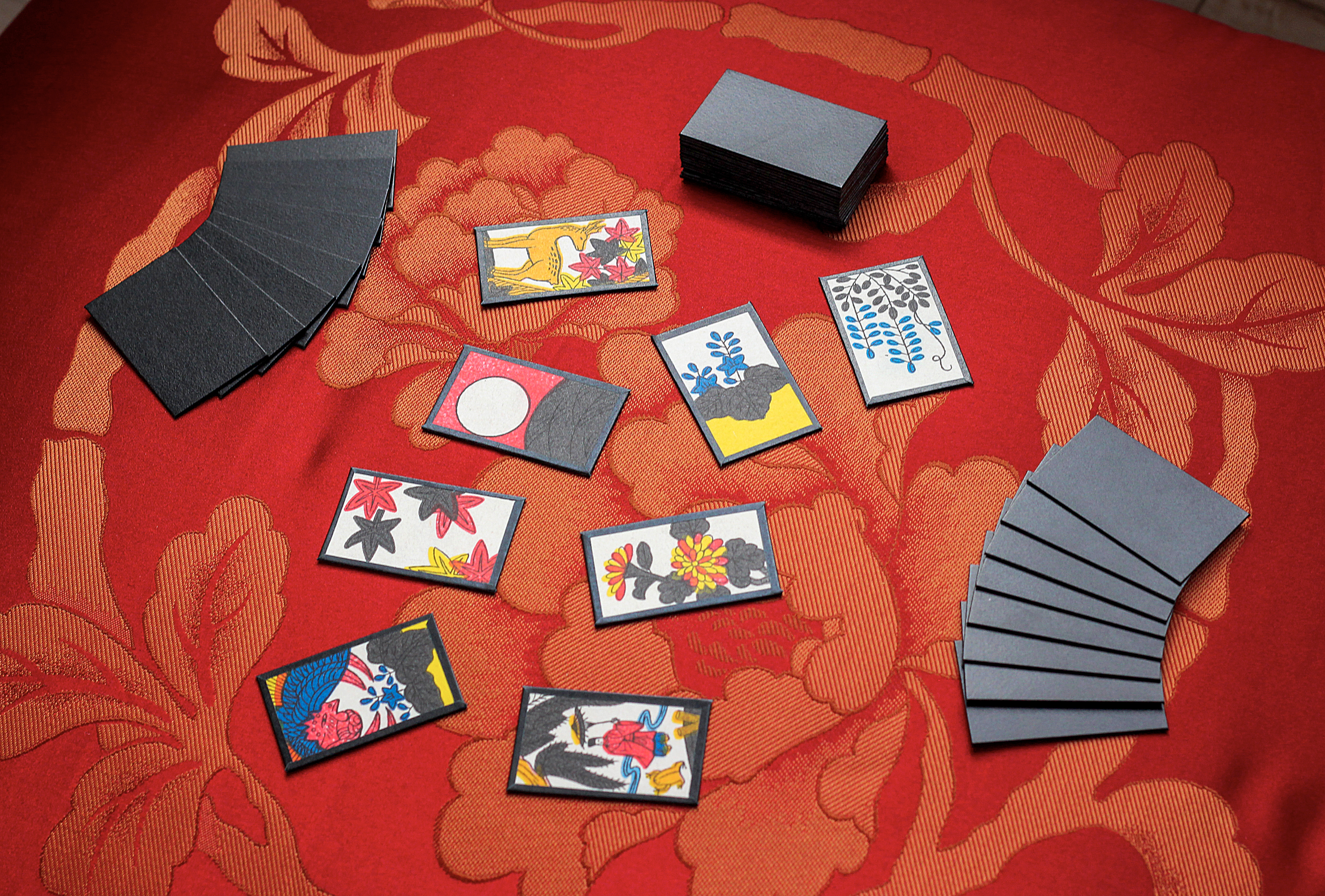
Hanafuda cards developed their unique design due to laws passed banning playing cards

In Japan, a distinct 48-card hanafuda deck is popular. It is derived from 16th-century Portuguese decks, after undergoing a long evolution driven by laws enacted by the Tokugawa shogunate attempting to ban the use of playing cards

The best-known deck internationally is the English pattern of the 52-card French deck, also called the International or Anglo-American pattern, used for such games as poker and contract bridge. It contains one card for each unique combination of thirteen ranks and the four French suits spades, hearts, diamonds, and clubs. The ranks (from highest to lowest in bridge and poker) are ace, king, queen, jack (or knave), and the numbers from ten down to two (or deuce). The trump cards and knight cards from the French playing tarot are not included.

Originally the term knave was more common than "jack"; the card had been called a jack as part of the terminology of all-fours since the 17th century, but the word was considered vulgar. (Note the exclamation by Estella in Charles Dickens's novel Great Expectations: "He calls the knaves, Jacks, this boy!") However, because the card abbreviation for knave ("Kn") was so close to that of the king, it was very easy to confuse them, especially after suits and rankings were moved to the corners of the card in order to enable people to fan them in one hand and still see all the values. (The earliest known deck to place suits and rankings in the corner of the card is from 1693, but these cards did not become common until after 1864 when Hart reintroduced them along with the knave-to-jack change.) However, books of card games published in the third quarter of the 19th century evidently still referred to the "knave", and the term with this definition is still recognized in the United Kingdom.

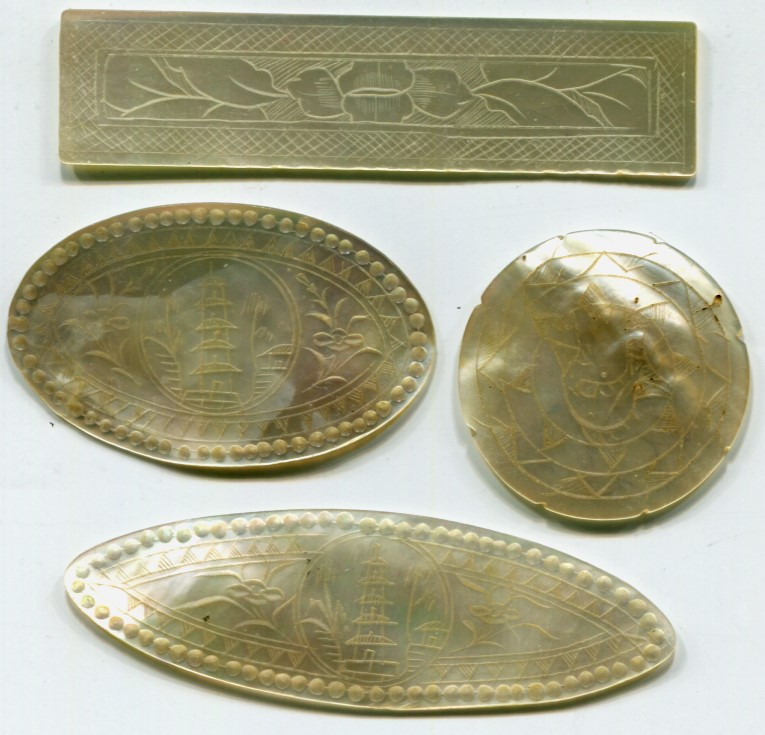
Chinese mother-of-pearl gambling tokens used in scoring and bidding of card games

Chinese handmade mother-of-pearl gaming counters were used in scoring and bidding of card games in the West during the approximate period of 1700–1840. The gaming counters would bear an engraving such as a coat of arms or a monogram to identify a family or individual. Many of the gaming counters also depict Chinese scenes, flowers or animals. Queen Charlotte is one prominent British individual who is known to have played with the Chinese gaming counters. Card games such as Ombre, Quadrille and Pope Joan were popular at the time and required counters for scoring. The production of counters declined after Whist, with its different scoring method, became the most popular card game in the West.

Playing cards developed an association with gambling or idle frivolity. Based on the association of card games and gambling, Pope Benedict XIV of the Catholic Church banned card games on October 17, 1750. The early Methodists did not participate in, and condemned, "worldly habits" including "playing cards, racing horses, gambling, attending the theater, dancing (both in frolics and balls), and cockfighting." The mother of Methodism Barbara Heck observed fellow Irish immigrants playing cards and then took them and "swept the cards into the fire". Methodist minister Harlie W. Smith described that following his experience of being born again, "three decks of cards and my dice went into the furnace." To the present-day, a number of Methodist denominations aligned with the holiness movement, such as the Allegheny Wesleyan Methodist Connection and Christ's Sanctified Holy Church, oppose card games.

== See also ==
- Game of chance
- Game of skill
- R. F. Foster (games)
- Henry Jones (writer) who wrote under the pseudonym "Cavendish"
- John Scarne
- Dice game
- List of card games by number of cards

== Bibliography ==
- Denning, Trevor (1996). The Playing Cards of Spain. London: Cygnus Arts. ISBN 978-0838637470.
- Depaulis, Thierry (1985). "Le Jeu de Cartes: Quelques Regles du Passe" in The Playing-Card. Vol. XIII (3). February 1985. ISSN 0305-2133 pp. 74–80.
- Depaulis, Thierry (1990). "Pochspiel: an 'International' Card Game of the 15th Century – Part I" in The Playing-Card, Vol. 19, No. 2 (November 1990), pp. 52–67.
- Florio, John (1591). Second Frutes. London: Woodcock.
- Needham, Joseph (1954), Science and Civilisation in China: Volume 1, Introductory Orientations, Cambridge University Press
- Needham, Joseph (2004) [1962], Science and Civilisation in China: Volume 4, Physics and Physical Technology; Part 1, Physics, Cambridge University Press, ISBN 0-521-05802-3
- Needham, Joseph; Tsien, Tsuen-hsuin (1985), Science and Civilization in China: Volume 5, Chemistry and Chemical Technology, Part 1, Paper and Printing, Cambridge University Press, ISBN 0-521-08690-6
- Parlett, David (1990), The Oxford Guide to Card Games, Oxford University Press, ISBN 978-0-19-214165-1
- Parlett, David (2007). "The origins of Euchre" in The Playing-Card, 35 (4), Apr–June 2007. ISSN 1752-671X pp. 255–261.
- Parlett, David (1991). A History of Card Games, OUP, Oxford. ISBN 0-19-282905-X
- * Skelton (1522). Why not to Court. Cited in the OED. See David Parlett's article: Laugh and Lie Down.
