= Musta Maija =

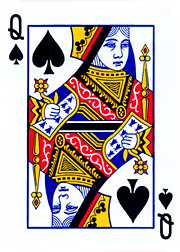
- Origin: Finland
- Alternative names: Black Maria
- Type: Shedding-type
- Players: 3-6
- Age range: Primarily for children, but interesting for adults too
- Cards: 52
- Deck: Anglo-American
- Rank (high→low): A K Q J 10 9 8 7 6 5 4 3 2
- Play: Clockwise

Musta Maija (Finnish pronunciation: [ˈmustɑˌmɑi̯jɑ]; "Black Mary") is a Finnish card game. It is primarily a children's game, but due to its tactical possibilities, it can be enjoyed by adults as well.

== Rules ==
The game is suitable for 3-5 players and uses the standard pack of 52 cards. Aces are high (meaning they have the highest value in the deck). Each player is dealt five cards and the remainder form a face-down stock. The top card of the stock is placed face up under the stock and determines the trump suit. If it is Spades, the card is returned into the middle of the stock, and a new card turned to determine trumps.

The Queen of Spades is a special card called Maija (Black Maria).

During play, whenever a player has fewer than five cards in their hand and there are cards left in the stock, the player must draw cards from the stock so that they have five cards.

Each player in turn plays one or more cards from the hand to the table with the following restrictions: the cards must all be of the same suit (for this purpose, Maija counts as a spade). Their number must not exceed the number of cards that the player to the left has in hand. Playing cards to the table is one action and the player may not draw cards from the stock while playing cards to the table.

After that, the player to the left tries to beat the cards on the table. A card can be beaten by a higher card of the same suit. A non-trump card can be beaten by any trump. A card can beat only one card. Musta Maija cannot be beaten, but cannot beat any other cards. Beating cards is one action and the player is not allowed to draw cards from the stock while following.

The entire trick is removed from play.

If the player to the left beat all the cards on the table, it is their turn to lead. If the player could not or did not want to beat all the cards on the table, they must pick up the remaining cards and the turn passes to the next player on the left.

Players who get rid of all their cards after the stock is exhausted are 'out' and do not participate further in the game. The last one left holding cards (including Maija) is the loser.
