= Speculation (card game) =

18th century card game

- A "mild domestic gambling game"
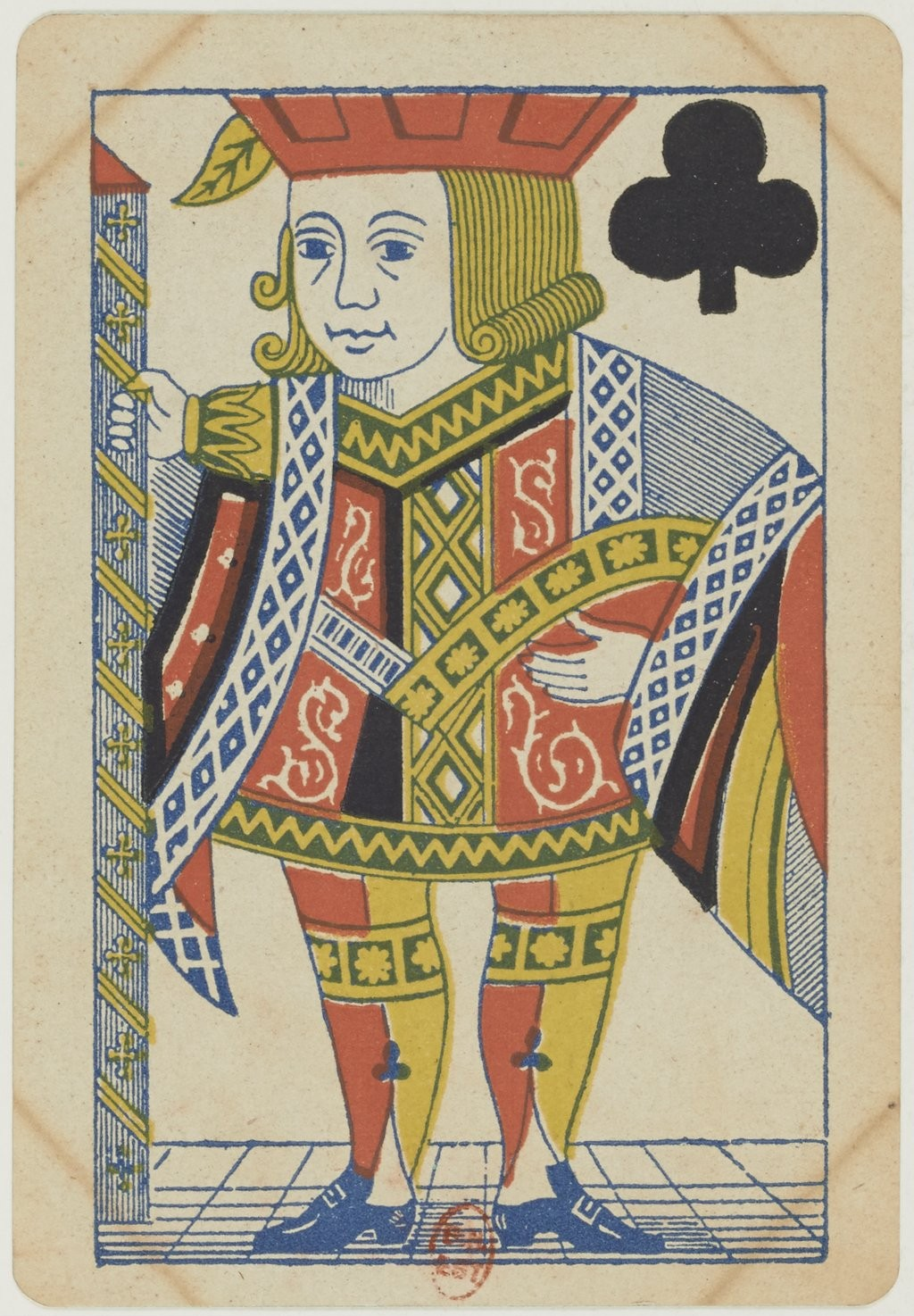
- Revealing a Jack incurs a penalty stake
- Origin: England
- Family: Trick-taking
- Players: any
- Cards: 52
- Deck: English
- Rank (high→low): A K Q J T 9 8 7 6 5 4 3 2
- Play: Clockwise

Related games
- Commerce

Speculation is a form of "mild domestic gambling game" that appeared in the late 18th century and was popular during the 19th century, but then disappeared. Rules first appear in the 1800 English edition of Hoyle's Games Improved. It is mentioned at times by Jane Austen, in Mansfield Park for example, and by Charles Dickens.

== Rules ==
=== Object ===
To hold the highest trump card when all cards in play have been revealed.

=== Cards ===
A 52-card English pattern pack is used with cards ranking in their natural order, Aces high.

=== Set-up ===
The dealer antes six chips. The other players each ante four.

The dealer gives each player three cards, face down. One additional card is placed face up. This card determines the trump suit, and the card belongs to the dealer.

=== Play ===
If the trump determining card was an Ace, the dealer wins immediately. Otherwise, the dealer may choose to keep it or to sell it to another player. Play passes to the left. If the trump-determining card was purchased, play passes to the left of the purchaser. Each player in his turn reveals a card. If the card is the highest current trump, he may keep the card or attempt to sell it to the highest bidder.

The holder of the current high trump does not take a turn revealing his cards unless all other cards have been revealed.

If no trump is revealed in the round, the pot carries over to the next round.

=== Variations ===
1. Anyone at any time may offer to buy any number of face down cards from another player. Cards purchased in this fashion are placed face down at the bottom of the purchaser's stack.
2. Anyone who reveals a Jack or a Five adds a chip to the pot.
3. An extra hand is dealt. If, at the end of the round, the extra hand is shown to hold the high trump card, the pot carries over to the next round.

== In literature ==
The game is mentioned in several books, both from the period and in later historical novels:

Mansfield Park and The Watsons - by Jane Austen
Nicholas Nickleby - by Charles Dickens
The Emancipator's Wife - by Barbara Hambly
The Thirteen Gun Salute - by Patrick O'Brian
Throne of Jade - by Naomi Novik
False Colours, The Quiet Gentleman and A Civil Contract - by Georgette Heyer

== Bibliography ==
- Jones, Charles, ed. (1800). Hoyle's Games Improved. London: Ritchie.
- Hoyle's Games (London, 1847)
