= Cuttle =

Card game

Cuttle is a two-player card game played with a standard deck of 52 playing cards and is likely the earliest example of a combat card game. The game has existed since at least the 1970s, but its exact date of its creation is unknown.

== History ==
The earliest surviving ruleset is an informal FAQ published online by Richard Sipie in 2000. He gives a mostly-complete description, but notes that in several situations the rules he gives are his own invention, and he's not sure if they match the original intention. In 2015, John McLeod added an expanded rules document to pagat.com, introducing the term "permanent effect" and structuring the rules in a more traditional and authoritative way. He also lists a number of variants suggested by players, some of which went on to become standard in competitive play. This document refers to a 2009 Mind Sports Olympiad Cuttle tournament, but it is currently unknown who competed, what rules were used, or how many times this event was held.

In 2022, Ryan Emberling launched cuttle.cards, an online platform for playing Cuttle against human opponents in real time, and established the World Championship tournament series described below. It features a slowly-evolving ruleset that has been shaped by the community in response to issues that arose during competition.

== Gameplay ==
The rules given here are from the earliest surviving source, the Sipie FAQ, with updated terminology from the Pagat page. There are some minor discrepancies and ambiguities discussed at the end of this section. Several variants also exist, notably the "cuttle.cards standard" ruleset below, which is used in modern competition.

=== Objective ===
The objective of cuttle is to assemble a collection of point cards that meet or exceed a goal, which starts at 21 points. The game ends as soon as a player meets this condition; that player is the winner. The game may also end in a draw if three passes occur in succession.

=== Setup ===
The play area is divided into four regions: The draw pile, the scrap pile, and each player's side, a region of the table where cards they control are displayed. Cards can also be held in each player's hand.

=== Dealing ===
At the beginning of the game a dealer is chosen randomly. The dealer deals five cards to their opponent and six to themself. These cards form the initial hands of both players. The remaining cards are placed face down between the players and become the draw pile.

=== Turn structure ===
The non-dealer goes first, and players alternate turns. On their turn a player must do one of the following:

- Draw a card from the draw pile, adding it to their hand.
- Pass the turn. This is only allowed if the draw pile is empty.
- Play a card from their hand, in one of four ways, elaborated below:
  - Play a point card
  - Play a card for its one-off effect
  - Play a card for its permanent effect
  - Scuttle an opponent's point card with a higher card

=== Playing a point card ===
To play a point card, a player puts a numeral card from their hand face up on their side under their control. It contributes points towards the controlling player's goal equal to its rank; Aces have rank 1.

=== Playing a card for its one-off effect ===
To play a card as for its one-off effect, a player reveals the card from their hand and announces their intention to use its one-off effect, and names the target if it is a 2 or a 9. The other player then has an opportunity to counter it with the one-off effect of a 2, moving it and the 2 to the scrap pile with no further effect. If they do, this creates another opportunity to counter that 2, and so on. If the effect is not countered, the player follows the instructions in the table below, and then the played card is moved to the scrap pile.

Card	Ability
Ace	Move all point cards to the scrap pile.
Two	1. Move a permanent effect card to the scrap pile. This is a targeted effect.; 2. Counter a one-off effect card. This is a targeted effect.
Three	Choose a card in the scrap pile and move it to your hand. Despite acting on a single card, this is not a targeted effect — the choice is made after the opportunity to counter.
Four	Force your opponent to discard two cards of their choice from their hand to the scrap pile.
Five	Draw two cards from the draw pile.
Six	Move all permanent effect cards to the scrap pile.
Seven	Draw a card and play it as if it were in your hand. If you can't, put it in the scrap pile. You must play it if possible, even if this requires giving away a point card with a Jack.
Nine	Move a card on either player's side to its controller's hand. This is a targeted effect.

=== Playing a card for its permanent effect ===
To play a card for its permanent effect, a player moves the card from their hand to their side. As long as it remains there, it creates the effect listed in the table below. The 8 is played sideways to differentiate it from an 8 played as point card, and is known as the "glasses 8". The Jack targets a point card, and is kept physically on top of that point card and any other Jacks already there.

Card	Effect
Eight	Your opponent plays with their hand revealed.
Jack	Switch control of the targeted point card for as long as you control the Jack.
Queen	None of your other cards may be targeted. The one-off effects of the 2 and 9 and the permanent effect of the Jack are the only cards that target.
King	Your point goal is reduced to 14. A second King reduces it to 10, a third to 7, and a fourth to 5.

=== Scuttling ===
To scuttle a point card, a player chooses a point card controlled by their opponent and moves that card and a point card of higher value from their hand to the scrap pile. For this purpose, suits are considered, in the traditional Bridge order (Clubs (lowest), Diamonds, Hearts, Spades). For example, the Nine of Hearts can scuttle the Nine of Clubs, and the Ten of Spades can scuttle any point card.

=== Ambiguities and other issues ===
There are a few considerations players should take into account before using this original ruleset.

==== Deck exhaustion ====
Richard Sipie notes that the ability to pass at the end is his invention, and implies that the original design may have called for the game to simply end at that point. However, he does not consider the third possibility of play continuing but disallowing the draw action, with a player with no moves either losing or causing a stalemate. It is unknown what the original design called for.

==== Hand size ====
Competitive play has shown that players often wish to draw large numbers of cards before playing anything. The original rules put no limitation on this, which can result in games with both players holding dozens of cards. This is often considered undesirable, so modern competitions have added a rule disallowing players from drawing when they already hold 8 cards.

==== Threes ====
As written, all variants of Cuttle allow players to use a 3 to retrieve a different 3 from the scrap. If both players wish to do this, the game can enter an infinite loop. This can be ruled a draw, disallowed entirely, disallowed immediately after the first time, or disallowed immediately after the second time.

==== Jacks and Nines ====
The pagat rules declare the effect of the 9 in the original ruleset to be "almost useless", excluding the case of winning by targeting a Jack, and suggest a variant in which a card targeted by a 9 can't be played the next turn. This is the rule used in modern competition. However, in the context of the original game, this only makes sense under a mistaken interpretation of the rules for Jacks. The Sipie FAQ makes it clear that a Jack switches control of the point card, rather than giving control to the Jack's controller. This is made explicit in the example about a 7 forcing a detrimental Jack play. Therefore, under these rules, the 9 is situationally very powerful: if a player Jacks a point card and their opponent Jacks it back, the first player can 9 their own Jack back to their hand, giving them control of the card via the opponent's remaining Jack and allowing them to replay their Jack.

This sequence is unambiguously allowed by the rules in the Sipie FAQ, but it is unclear whether it was known to him or other players prior to the publication of those rules. The modern competitive community has decided that it is not a desirable play pattern, and thus uses a more straightforward rule for Jacks, under which they give the controlling player control of the point card, and can never be detrimental.

The Sipie FAQ also uses the words "owner" and "controller" somewhat loosely. It's possible that the original ruleset intended 9s to be able to bounce a Jacked point card back to one's own hand. However, as written, it would bounce that point card to the opponent's hand.

==== Queens ====
The Pagat page erroneously states that two Queens on the same side do not protect each other, and lists this as a variant. However, the Sipie FAQ makes it clear that they do.

== Variants ==
There are many variations on Cuttle. Several variants are listed below.

=== cuttle.cards Standard ===
Online play at cuttle.cards uses several minor changes to the rules written above, in order to fine-tune the game's balance for competitive play:

- The most important change is the addition of an 8-card hand limit. Players cannot draw when they have 8 cards in hand and playing a 5 when you have 8 cards already draws you just one card so you go up to 8.
- Seven one-offs: reveal the top two cards of the deck (instead of one), and the active player chooses one of the cards to play, and puts the other back on top of the deck.
- Five one-offs: discard one card, then draw three cards. If you have no other cards after playing the 5, skip discarding and simply draw 3.
- Nine one-offs: return target permanent to its controller's hand. It cannot be played next turn.
- Having 3 kings reduces a player's goal to 5 points (from 7), and having all 4 kings reduces a player's goal to 0 points (from 5) and causes that player to immediately win.

=== Cutthroat cuttle (1v1v1) ===
Cutthroat is a fast-paced 1v1v1 version of Cuttle. It is played with the same rules as the cuttle.cards Vanilla rules, with the following changes:

- The win condition is reduced. Players need 14 points to win by default, 9 points with one King in play, 5 points with two Kings in play, and having 3 Kings in play immediately wins (goal becomes zero).
- To start play, deal each player 5 cards and the player to the left of the dealer goes first. Which player is the dealer rotates clockwise each game.
- Shuffle two Jokers into the deck. Jokers count as Royals with the effect "Steal target Royal".
- The hand limit is reduced to 7 (from 8).
- When playing a glasses 8, instead of forcing players to play open handed, the player with the glasses may request to see either opponent's hand at any time

=== Team cuttle (2v2) ===
Team Cuttle is a 2v2 game where players sit across from their partner. A team wins if either of its players earns the required number of points, but players do not share cards in their hand or on their field (points are counted separately and your Royals do not directly affect your partner). Otherwise, the rules are the same as cuttle.cards Vanilla Cuttle, with the following changes:

- Each player is dealt 5 cards, play starts left of the dealer and proceeds clockwise from there.
- Shuffle two Jokers into the deck. Jokers count as Royals with the effect "Steal target Royal". Similar to Jacks, they may transfer control of a Royal from any player to any other player.
- The hand limit is reduced to 7 (from 8).
- Jacks may be played to transfer control of any point card to any other player. You may therefore "steal" points from yourself (or anyone else) in order to give them to your partner, potentially winning on your turn with their points (their goal is still determined by the count of their own Kings on the field).
- Nines can be played for an alternative, similar effect. Whenever an opponent plays a Royal, you may immediately play a Nine in response to return that card to its owner's hand immediately, preventing its effect from taking place. Doing so may be done out of turn and does not take your turn, but does not prevent the target's owner from playing the card again on their next turn. Alternatively, you may still play a Nine for its original one-off effect on your turn (taking your turn to do so) to return a card to its controller's hand and prevent them from playing that card on their next turn.

== Competitive cuttle ==
The largest and longest-running competitive Cuttle league is hosted online at cuttle.cards. Players compete online in 1v1 matches that qualify them for Season Championship tournaments, and the top competitors in the Season Championships earn places in the annual Cuttle World Championship.

=== Competitive format ===
Competitive Cuttle divides the 52 weeks of the year into 4 seasons: Clubs, Diamonds, Hearts, and Spades, spanning 13 weeks each (mirroring the composition of a standard deck of 52 playing cards. Play is generally structured around first-to-two-wins matches (like best 2/3, but where stalemates are ignored and play continues until one player reaches 2 wins) between two opponents. Every week, players earn points for the number of matches they win against unique opponents relative to other players, as follows:

Points for Weekly Ranked Play
Weekly Placement	Points
1st place (defeated most unique opponents)	5 points
2nd place	4 points
3rd place	3 points
At least one win without placing	2 points
At least one match with 0 wins	1 point

At the end of each 13-week season, the Top 8 Players earn places in that season's Championship tournament. Contestants in those tournaments earn points towards a place in the annual Cuttle World Championship as follows:

Season Championship Points
Place in Season Championship	Points
1st Place	21 points
2nd Place	14 points
3rd Place	10 points
4th Place	7 points
5th Place	5 points
6th Place	3 points
7th Place	2 points
8th Place	1 point

At the end of the year, points are calculated from the 4 Season Championships (Clubs, Diamonds, Hearts, and Spades), and the Top 8 players with the most points earn places in the Cuttle World Championship.

=== History of competitive cuttle ===
Below is a record of the Cuttle tournaments that have taken place throughout the game's history.

==== Diamonds 2025 ====
The Diamonds 2025 season of competitive Cuttle ran from 2025/04/02 - 2025/07/02. The Diamonds 2025 Cuttle Season Championship tournament was a Double-elimination tournament using tie breakers and a bracket reset, with 8 competitors, who placed as follows:

1. Avi
2. MonarchMan
3. SUBMARINO
4. bbjme
5. aleph_one
6. saksham
7. ButterBothSides
8. veten

==== Clubs 2025 ====
The Clubs 2025 season of competitive Cuttle ran from 2025/01/01 - 2025/04/02. The Clubs 2025 Cuttle Season Championship tournament was a Double-elimination tournament using tie breakers and a bracket reset, with 8 competitors, who placed as follows:

1. ButterBothSides
2. Personman
3. SUBMARINO
4. aleph_one
5. bbjme
6. Avi
7. MonarchMan
8. saksham

==== Cuttle World Championship IV ====
The 4th Cuttle World Championship was conducted on March 8th, 2025 and it served as the culmination of the 2024 year of competitive Cuttle. Contestants earned their place in Cuttle World Championship IV based on their performance across the four season championships for 2024: Clubs 2024, Diamonds 2024, Hearts 2024, and Spades 2024, as seen in the official Cuttle World Championship leaderboard for 2024. The format was a Double-elimination tournament with 8 competitors who placed as follows:

1. Avi
2. bbjme
3. aleph_one
4. MonarchMan
5. ButterBothSides
6. gman232
7. SUBMARINO
8. Personman

==== Spades 2024 ====
The Spades 2024 season of competitive Cuttle ran from 2024/10/02 - 2025/01/01. The Spades 2024 Cuttle Season Championship tournament was a Double-elimination tournament using tie breakers and a bracket reset, with 8 competitors, who placed as follows:

1. SUBMARINO
2. aleph_one
3. bbjme
4. MonarchMan
5. ButterBothSides
6. saksham
7. Personman
8. Avi

==== Hearts 2024 ====
The Hearts 2024 season of competitive Cuttle ran from 2024/07/03 - 2024/10/02. The Hearts 2024 Cuttle Season Championship tournament was a Double-elimination tournament using tie-breakers and a bracket reset, with 8 competitors, who placed as follows:

1. MonarchMan
2. Personman
3. ButterBothSides
4. bbjme
5. aleph_one
6. Avi
7. Gold_General
8. SUBMARINO

==== Diamonds 2024 ====
The Diamonds 2024 season of competitive Cuttle ran from 2024/04/03 - 2024/07/03. The Diamonds 2024 Season Championship tournament was a Double-elimination tournament with 8 competitors who placed as follows:

1. MonarchMan
2. Personman
3. bbjme
4. Avi
5. ButterBothSides
6. aleph_one
7. SUBMARINO
8. GoldGeneral_0

==== Clubs 2024 ====
The Clubs 2024 season of competitive Cuttle ran from 2024/01/03 - 2024/04/03. The Clubs 2024 Season Championship tournament was a Double-elimination tournament using tie-breakers and a bracket reset, with 8 competitors who placed as follows:

1. aleph_one
2. MonarchMan
3. bbjme
4. Avi
5. gman232
6. Eorgosa
7. ButterBothSides
8. SUBMARINO

==== Cuttle World Championship III ====
The 3rd Cuttle World Championship was conducted on February 10, 2024 and it served as the culmination of the 2023 year of competitive Cuttle. Contestants earned their place in Cuttle World Championship III based on their performance across the four season championships for 2023: Clubs 2023, Diamonds 2023, Hearts 2023, and Spades 2023, as seen in the official Cuttle World Championship leaderboard for 2023. The format was a Double-elimination tournament with 8 competitors who placed as follows:

1. Avi
2. Launceleyn
3. aleph_one
4. SUBMARINO
5. ButterBothSides
6. Eorgosa
7. gman232
8. bbjme

==== Spades 2023 ====
The Spades 2023 season of competitive Cuttle ran from 2023/10/04 - 2024/01/03. The Spades 2023 Season Championship tournament was a Double-elimination tournament with 8 competitors who placed as follows:

1. aleph_one
2. meichthys
3. SUBMARINO
4. gman232
5. bbjme
6. Avi
7. ButterBothSides
8. MonarchMan

==== Hearts 2023 ====
The Hearts 2023 season of competitive Cuttle ran from 2023/07/05 - 2023/10/04. The Hearts 2023 Season Championship tournament was a Double-elimination tournament with 8 competitors who placed as follows:

1. Eorgosa
2. Avi
3. gman232
4. ButterBothSides
5. aleph_one
6. Pluka
7. SUBMARINO
8. bbjme

==== Diamonds 2023 ====
The Diamonds 2023 season of competitive Cuttle ran from 2023/04/05 - 2023/07/05. The Diamonds 2023 Season Championship tournament was a Double-elimination tournament with 8 competitors who placed as follows:

1. Eorgosa
2. gman232
3. Avi
4. aleph_one
5. bbjme, ButterBothSides (tie)
6. ButterBothSides
7. akuden, SUBMARINO (tie)

==== Clubs 2023 ====
The Clubs 2023 season of competitive Cuttle ran from 2023/01/04 - 2023/04/05. The Clubs 2023 Season Championship tournament was a Double-elimination tournament with 8 competitors who placed as follows:

1. SUBMARINO
2. lanceleyn
3. Eorgosa
4. aleph_one
5. gman232
6. ButterBothSides
7. dp
8. bbjme

==== Cuttle World Championship II ====
The Cuttle World Championship II was held on 2023/01/04. It was a Double-elimination tournament between 12 contestants, who placed as follows:

1. gman232
2. dp
3. hfromeo2
4. aleph_one
5. launceleyn & SUBMARINO (tie)
6. pfCuttle & DanMan422 (tie)
7. Eorgosa, Mxyon, byarmis, & dylanfryer (tie)

==== Spades 2022 ====
The Spades 2022 season of competitive Cuttle ran from 2022/10/19 - 2023/01/04. The Spades 2022 Season Championship tournament was a Double-elimination tournament with 8 competitors who placed as follows:

1. hfromeo2
2. dylanfryer
3. dp
4. DanMan422
5. ollien, theneosloth (tie)
6. Rismient, bbjme (tie)
7. Parma2

==== Hearts 2022 ====
The Hearts 2022 season of competitive Cuttle ran from 2022/07/20 - 2022/10/19. The Hearts 2022 Season Championship tournament was a Double-elimination tournament with 8 competitors who placed as follows:

1. aleph_one
2. gman232
3. SUBMARINO
4. launceleyn
5. Seriouslysean, Ben (tie)
6. pfcuttle, bbjme (tie)

==== Diamonds 2022 ====
The Diamonds 2022 season of competitive Cuttle ran from 2022/04/20 - 2022/07/20. The Diamonds 2022 Season Championship tournament was a Double-elimination tournament with 4 competitors who placed as follows:

1. gman232
2. lanceleyn
3. aleph_one
4. Ben

==== Clubs 2022 ====
The Clubs 2022 season of competitive Cuttle ran from 2023/01/19 - 2023/04/20. The Clubs 2022 Season Championship tournament was a Double-elimination tournament with 4 competitors who placed as follows:

1. gman232
2. aleph_one
3. TophYamato
4. SUBMARINO
