= Konter a Matt =

Four-player card game of Luxembourg

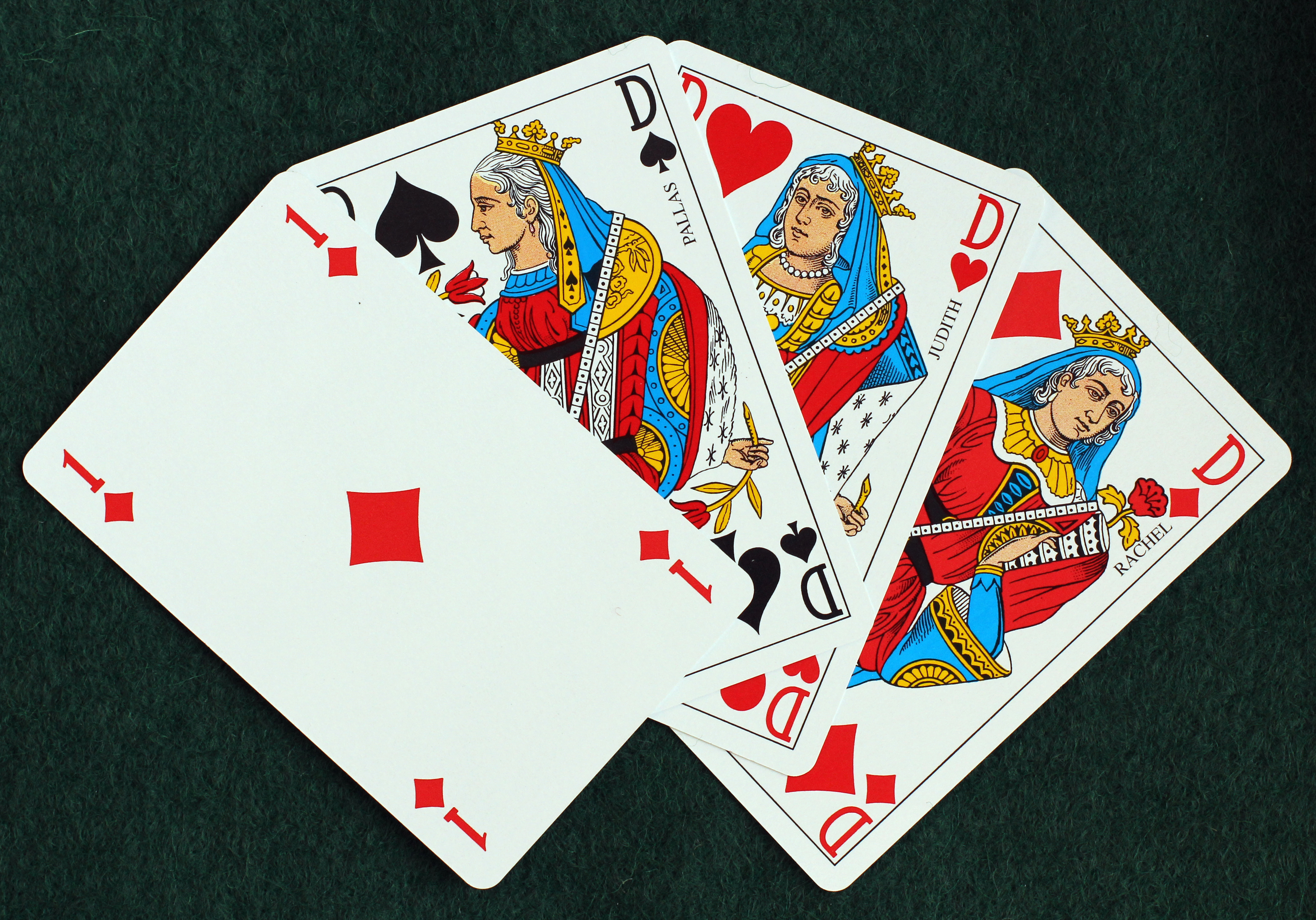
- The top cards when Diamonds are trumps
- Origin: Luxembourg
- Type: Point-trick
- Family: Couillon Group
- Players: 4 (2 teams of 2)
- Cards: 24
- Deck: French
- Rank (high→low): A ♠Q ♥Q ♦Q K (Q) 10 9
- Play: Anticlockwise

Related games
- Couillon, Kujong, Troeven

Konter a Matt, Kontra a Matt or Konter a Midd is a Luxembourgish trick-taking card game played by four players. The game is popular enough to have been televised on RTL, Luxembourg's leading TV station and for tournaments to be organised. (Note: For example, in 2013 in Bettenduerf and in 2016 in Junglinster.) Konter a Matt is one of a family of similar games, known as the Couillon Group, played in the Benelux area. Other games in the family include the Belgian game of Couillon, known as Kwajongen in Flemish areas and Kujong in Luxembourg, the Dutch game of Troeven and the Belgian games of Brûte and Gamelle.

== Rules ==
The following rules are based on those published online by Wellkomm.

=== Aim ===
Players form two teams of two with partners sitting opposite one another. In order to win a match, a team has to score over 21 card points. If each team gets 20 points, it is a draw.

=== Cards ===
A 24-card stripped deck is used with four suits each comprising Ace (A), King (K), Queen (Q), Jack (J), Ten (10) and Nine (9). The card values are: Ace 4, King 3, Queen 2, Jack 1, 10 and 9 nothing. There are three matadors which are permanent trumps and rank immediately behind the trump Ace: ♠Q, ♥Q and ♦Q. These cards give the game its name because the ♥Q and ♦Q are the two Konters or Kontras and the ♠Q is the Matt, Midd or Meedchen ("Girl").

As a consequence, in a match, there are 8 or 9 trumps depending on the suit. The four possibilities are (cards ranking from highest to lowest):

- Spades: ♠A ♠Q ♥Q ♦Q ♠K ♠J ♠10 ♠9
- Hearts: ♥A ♠Q ♥Q ♦Q ♥K ♥J ♥10 ♥9
- Diamonds: ♦A ♠Q ♥Q ♦Q ♦K ♦J ♦10 ♦9
- Clubs: ♣A ♠Q ♥Q ♦Q ♣K ♣Q ♣J ♣10 ♣9

=== Deal and declarations ===
Teams are decided and players take their seats accordingly. The dealer shuffles the cards and offers them to the person to the left to cut the pack. Forehand, the one to the dealer's right, is then dealt three cards, examines them and then declares trumps. The dealer waits until trumps are confirmed, then continues to deal. Every player receives six cards in two packets of three.

A player who has either the ♠Q or the ♥Q ♦Q pair or both and believes he or she can win, may announce this before playing a card by saying "Matt", "Konter" or "Konter a Matt" respectively. These announcements raise the game value, but must be made before the announcer plays a card to the first trick. A player making an announcement after this point is too late and the game value is not increased.

=== Play ===
Players must either follow suit or trump. So a player who can follow suit may not play a card of another side suit, but may play a trump. If a trump is led, a trump must be played if possible. If no trump is played, the suit that must be followed is that of the first card played. The highest card of this suit wins the trick. The value range is (highest to lowest): A, K, Q, J, 10 and 9. The person that wins the four cards of a trick places them face down to his or her side, taking care not to mix them with the other cards. Sometimes, it will be necessary to check whether somebody played a trump or not.

=== Winning ===
Initial scoring template

A match consists of at least three games. When beginning a match, the scorer draws the scoring diagram (1st illustration). A team wins a game if all of its lines have been crossed out. By convention the scorer's team is always shown in the lower row. Various factors affect the game score:

- A team may declare trumps and lose.
- The game values vary according whether Konter, Matt or Konter-Matt has been announced (a player must have the relevant cards to announce them.) A Konter or Matt is worth double, Konter a Matt triple.
- A team may lose without taking any tricks; this is a Kapo.
- A team may win or lose in the game following a drawn game.

If the declarers lose, they add as many lines as the winners erase (see 2nd illustration). If the other team got no draw at all, there will be one more stripe removed and eventually one more added. In the examples below, the scoring team loses each time:

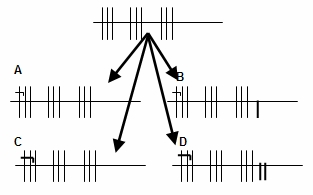
Scoring examples

- A. Simple game lost. Winners cross out 1 line.
- B. Simple game lost, but the losers (scoring team) chose trumps. Winners cross out 1 line; losers add 1 line.
- C. Game lost and either Konter or Matt were announced. Winners cross out 2 lines.
- D. Game lost and either Konter or Matt were announced; losers chose trumps. Winners cross out 2 lines; losers add two lines.
- Game lost and Konter a Matt was announced. Winners cross out 3 lines.
- Game lost and Konter a Matt was announced; losers chose trumps. Winners cross out 3 lines; losers add 3 lines.

A tie (20–20) is known as a Stänner or Rampo. In this case, no lines are erased, but the team that named trumps adds 1 to 3 lines, depending on any announcements made (an alternative rule is that the points are carried forward to the next game).

For the next game, forehand (the person who named trumps) becomes the dealer.

After a match, the losing team may ask for a "revenge", a new match with the same team setup. Otherwise, the team composition is changed.

== Strategy ==
Konter a Matt strategy is complex. Some high-level considerations are: If the trumps are equally distributed among the players, playing twice a trump may leave none or one trump. If the trumps are out, the Aces are the highest cards.

A good player always knows:

- how many trumps are still in the game.
- what cards are still in the game.
- how many points both teams have.

If a team has more than 20 points, they may put the rest of the cards on the table and declare that e.g. "we have 23".
