= Ronfa =

Card game

Ronfa was a 15th-century Italian card game, probably of French origin, and one of the two earliest known games in Europe. It may have been the name of a since lost game of dice or tables.

== History ==
The game probably originated in France as Ronfle and then migrated to Italy where it became known as Ronfa. The earliest reference appears in a sermon by an unknown Dominican friar which dates to the period 1450–1480. It is mentioned twice; once as a card game (Ronfa, ludus cartularum) and a second time, perhaps as a dice or tables game (Ronfa, Buffa Aragiato). By the last decade of the 15th century it was firmly established in Italy, being banned in Bergamo in 1491 and also being among the games played at the court of Ferrara. It continues to be frequently reported in Italy during the 16th century.

The game was known in France as Ronfle and first mentioned in 1458. (Note: See Depaulis in "The First Reference to Glic", International Playing-Card Society website.) As Depaulis explains, a ronfle in French was a flush, a combination of cards all of the same suit. In older French dictionaries it was the same as the point in the game of Piquet and was referred to in English as Ruff, although that later became a term that meant "trump".

Dummett assesses that Ronfa was probably not originally a trick-taking game and did not feature a trump suit. A reference dating to the period 1471–1495 states that Ronfa, a Neapolitan game, was played in Ferrara with a 48-card pack, the 10s being the cards omitted.

== Bibliography ==
- Depaulis, Thierry (1985). "Le Jeu de Cartes: Quelques Regles du Passe" in The Playing-Card. Vol. XIII (3). February 1985. ISSN 0305-2133 pp. 74–80.
- Dummett, Michael (1980). The Game of Tarot. London: Duckworth.
- Dummett, Michael (2004). "48-Card Packs in Italy" in The Playing-Card. Vol. 33 (1). July-September 2004. ISSN 0305-2133 pp. 24–26.
- Steele, Robert (1900). "A notice of the Ludus Triumphorum" in Archaeologia Vol. LVII, pp. 185–200.
