= James Bond (card game) =

Matching card game

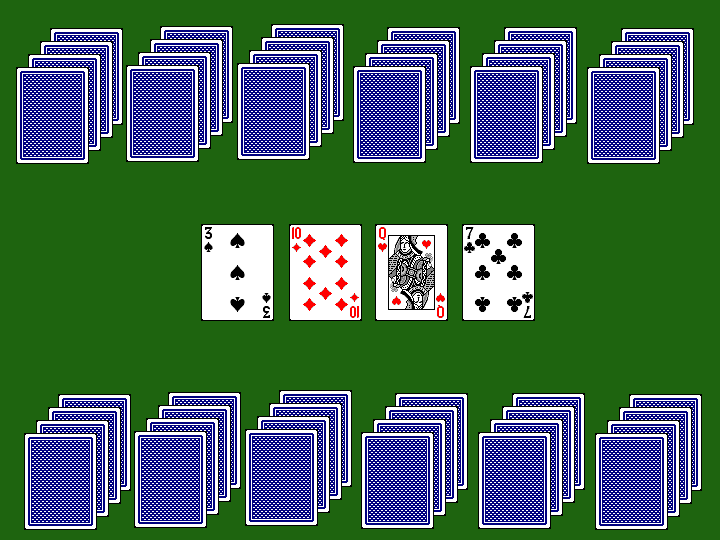
- Initial card layout for 2 players
- Origin: United States
- Alternative names: Atlantis, Chanhassen, Jellyfish
- Type: Matching
- Players: 2–4
- Age range: 4+
- Cards: 52
- Deck: French/standard
- Play: Simultaneous
- Playing time: 5-10 min.
- Chance: Medium

James Bond (also Lemon, Atlantis or Chanhassen) is a matching card game where players compete to see who can assemble piles of four-of-a-kind the fastest.

Pagat.com describes it in 2009 as a widespread children's game which "seems to be of fairly recent origin", and popular in California.

== Deal ==
Starting with a standard deck (54 cards), remove the two Joker cards. There will be 52 cards left. Deal four cards face up in the middle. The remaining 48 cards of the deck are dealt out into twelve face-down piles of four. In a two-player game, each player receives six of these piles to put in front of them; in a three-player game, they receive four; in a four-player game, they receive three.

== The play ==
When play begins each player views one pile of four cards. Players may trade cards in their hands with cards in the middle, as many as they like holding no more than four cards at a time. That is to say, players must discard their card(s) to the middle first and then pick up their new cards. Players may change as many cards (1–4) as they like. Players can, at any time, place their pile face down and pick up a different pile and continue to play. Players, at all times, may have no more than 4 cards in their hand. Likewise, they may not hold or look at more than one pile at a time. When a player has four of a kind in one pile, they place their pile face up.

A player wins when all their piles have four of a kind, are face up, and the player calls, "James Bond!" before the other player (or the name of the game, in the case of other versions).

== Teams ==
An alternative version for four players is to play with two teams of two such that a pair of players shares six piles and can then view two piles simultaneously.

== Three Players ==
When playing with three players, each player will be given 16 cards. The players will create four piles of cards, consisting of four cards each. Similar to the gameplay with two people, players will aim to have all four piles of cards with the same card type. The game ends when the first player to have all piles completed calls "James Bond" (or whichever name of the game, varying based on version) first.

== Four Players ==
When playing with four players, each player will be given 12 cards. The players will create three piles of cards, consisting of four cards each. With the same gameplay mechanics, the aim of the game if to have all piles with the same card type. The game will end when the first person to have completed the objective calls out "James Bond" (or whichever name depending on the version you play) first.
