= Hoc Mazarin =

French gambling game

- Old French gambling game of the Stops family
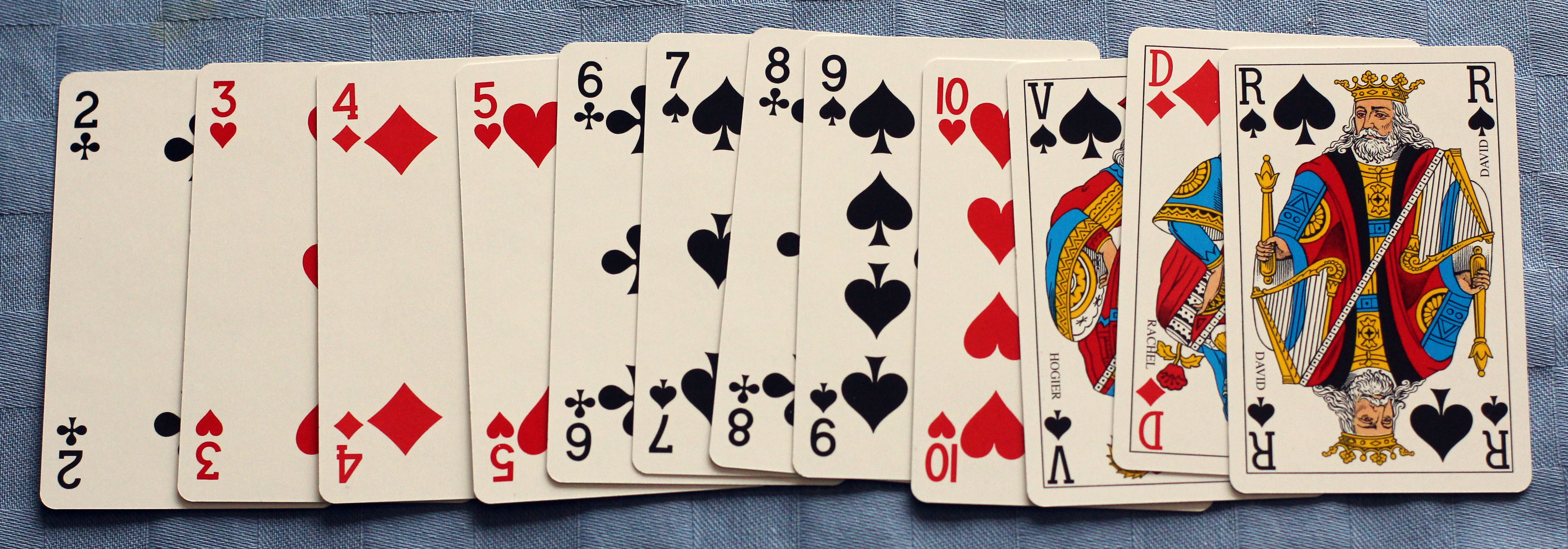
- A long run in Hoc Mazarin
- Origin: France
- Alternative names: Hoc
- Type: Vying and shedding
- Family: Stops group; Hoc family
- Players: 2–3
- Cards: 52
- Deck: Paris pattern, French-suited
- Play: Anticlockwise

Related games
- Comet, Emprunt, Nain Jaune, Newmarket

Hoc Mazarin, also just Hoc, is an historical French gambling game of the Stops family for two or three players. The game was popular at the court of Versailles in the 17th century and was named after Cardinal Mazarin, chief minister to the King of France.

== History ==
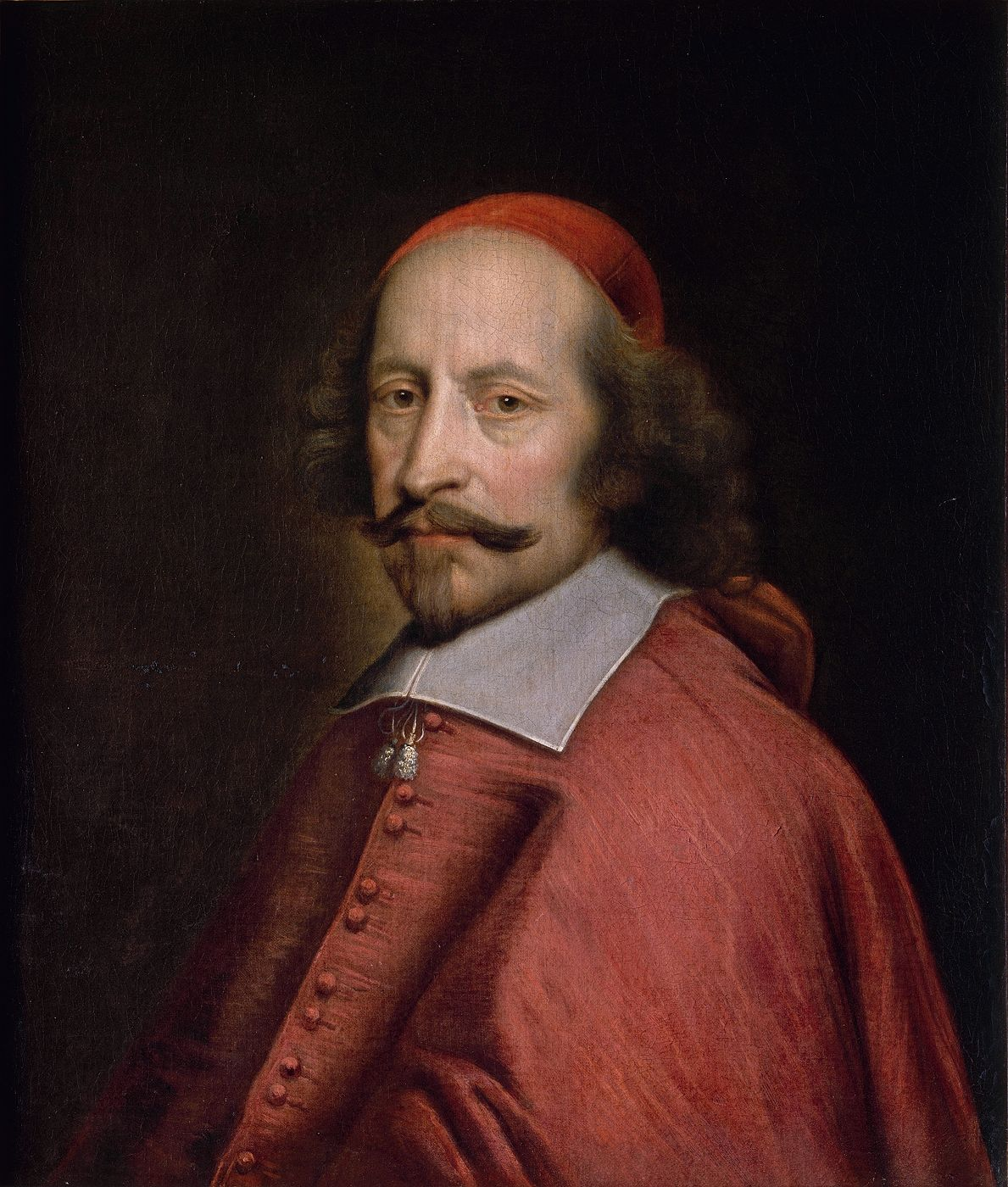
Cardinal Mazarin

Hoc Mazarin is named after Italian prelate Cardinal Mazarin (1602–1661), who served as the chief minister to the kings of France, Louis XIII and Louis XIV, from 1642 until 1661. Mazarin probably invented the game and he was certainly much in favour of it while at the court of Versailles. It is mentioned in the literature as early as 1649, where it is described as "an invention of the devil".

The rules first appeared in 1654 simply under the name of Hoc, even though the name Hoc Mazarin was already in vogue, but by 1730 they were being printed as rules for Hoc Mazarin which was described as one of two variants of Hoc. The second variant was Hoc de Lyon or Hoc de Lion which, however, is nowhere described. Rules for Hoc or Hoc Mazarin continued to be reprinted until the late 19th century.

== Rules ==
=== Overview ===
Hoc Mazarin is a multi-stake, vying game with two stages. In the first, each player is dealt 12 cards from a standard pack and compete for 3 stakes for point, sequence and tricon. In the second, they play a type of Hoc in which the aim is to be first to shed all one's hand cards. The following rules are based on the Académie des Jeux Oubliés.

=== Stage 1 ===
==== Preliminaries ====
A standard 52-card pack is used with card ranking in their natural order, Aces low.

Each player is typically given 20 jetons and 8 fiches at the start of the game, the equivalent of 100 jetons. The pack is fanned on the table, face down, and each player draws a card; the one with the lowest becomes the first dealer. The dealer shuffles, offers to the left for cutting and deals 15 cards (if two are playing) or 12 cards (if three play). The rest are placed face down to one side and are out of the game.

==== Stakes ====
Before each deal, players ante 3 jetons to the table as a pool, one for each of the following stakes:

- Point. The most cards of one suit in hand, declared by saying e.g. "5 cards". If two players have the same number, the one with the most card points wins, courts being worth 10 each and pips their face value. Aces are worth 1 point. If two players have the same number of points, positional priority applies.
- Sequence (Secance). The longest run of cards in hand, declared by saying "tierce" for 3 cards, "quart" (quatrième) for four and "quinte" for five cards or more. If two players have the same sequence, the highest ranking one wins, determined by the highest card of the sequence. Players declare this by stating the rank e.g. "Queen" (a la dame). A King sequence is a major and an Ace sequence a minor. If two players have the same ranking sequence, positional priority applies.
- Tricon. A combination of 3 or 4 cards of the same denomination, declared with "brelan" (3 cards) or "fredon" (4 cards). If two players have the same tricon, they declare the rank e.g. "Jacks" (de valet). A King tricon is a major, an Ace tricon, a minor.

==== Auction ====
Players vie separately for each of the three stakes. First hand opens the bidding and has three options: to declare, raise or pass. Subsequent players may hold (adding the same number of jetons as the player before, raise (by adding more jetons than the player before) or fold by saying "(it's) good". Raising is limited to a maximum of, usually, 20 jetons.

If only one player is left in at the end, that player wins that particular stake. If more than one player is left in, beginning with first hand they declare their hands and the winner is decided as explained above.

==== Winnings ====
Whether the game is single or double, the winner always sweeps the corresponding pool.

In Sequence or Tricon, the winner is also paid by the other players based on the combination declared and whether the game is valued single or double. The hand cards of a winner who is the only player left in need not be revealed, especially if the combination is not actually held (i.e. it was a bluff). The winner may claim payment for lower combinations held as well as the one declared. The payments for Sequence and Tricon in a normal game are:

Stake	Sequence			Tricon	
Combination	Tierce	Quart	Quinte	Brelan	Carré
Simple	1	2	3	2	4
Major	2	3	4	4	8

If the game is worth double, all the above payments are multiplied by 2. A "major" combination is one where the King is the only or highest card.

If more than one player has bluffed and none has a valid sequence or tricon, the winner is the one with higher positional priority and they are only paid the pool.

If any player is dealt a hand with no courts, this is a carte blanche and that player is paid 10 jetons by each other player. If two players have a carte blanche, they may show them but no payments are made.

=== Stage 2 ===
==== Aim ====
Stage 2 is a type of Hoc game in which players aim to be first to shed their cards using the same hands as were dealt in stage 1.

==== Play ====
First hand leads with any card, but usually the lowest of the longest sequence held. Cards must be played in ascending rank, the suit being irrelevant. Cards are declared as played and the player ends by naming the next card in sequence (which is not held) preceded by "without", e.g. "6, 7, without 8". On ending, the next player continues the sequence if possible or passes by saying "without 8". If no-one can play, the one who played the last card may start a new sequence with any card. It is compulsory to play if you can; a player who holds a card back illegally is fined 5 jetons. An exception is the Hoc (see below).

==== Hocs ====
The last card of a sequence is a hoc. There are two types. An incidental hoc is one that results from no players having the next card in hand because it is sleeping in the talon. In addition, there are 6 principal hocs: ♣K, ♠K, ♥K, ♦K, ♠Q, and ♦J. The principal hocs are wild and may be played as any card. Whenever a principal hoc is played, the player may begin a new sequence. As it is played, the player declares "Hoc!" and claims 1 jeton from each opponent. In the case of an incidental hoc, the player declares it on starting the new sequence.

==== Payment ====
The game ends as soon as one player sheds all hand cards, thus becoming the winner. The winner is paid by each opponent based on the number of cards they have left. For 1 card, 6 jetons; 2 cards, 8 jetons; 3–9 cards, 1 jeton per card; 10 or more cards, 2 jetons per card.

== Literature ==
- _ (1649). Le Funeste Hoc de Jules Mazarin. Paris: N. Boisset.
- D.L.M. (1654). Le Maison Acadèmique. Paris: Robert de Nain.
- _ (1730). Académie universelle des jeux. Paris: Legras.
- Bellecour, Abbé (1770). The Academy of Play. London: Newbery. English translation.
- Moulidars, Th. de (1888). Grande encyclopédie méthodique, universelle, illustrée des jeux et des divertissements de l'esprit et du corps. Paris.
- Parlett, David (1991). A History of Card Games, OUP, Oxford. ISBN 0-19-282905-X
