= Emprunt =

Historical French card game

- One of the Hoc family
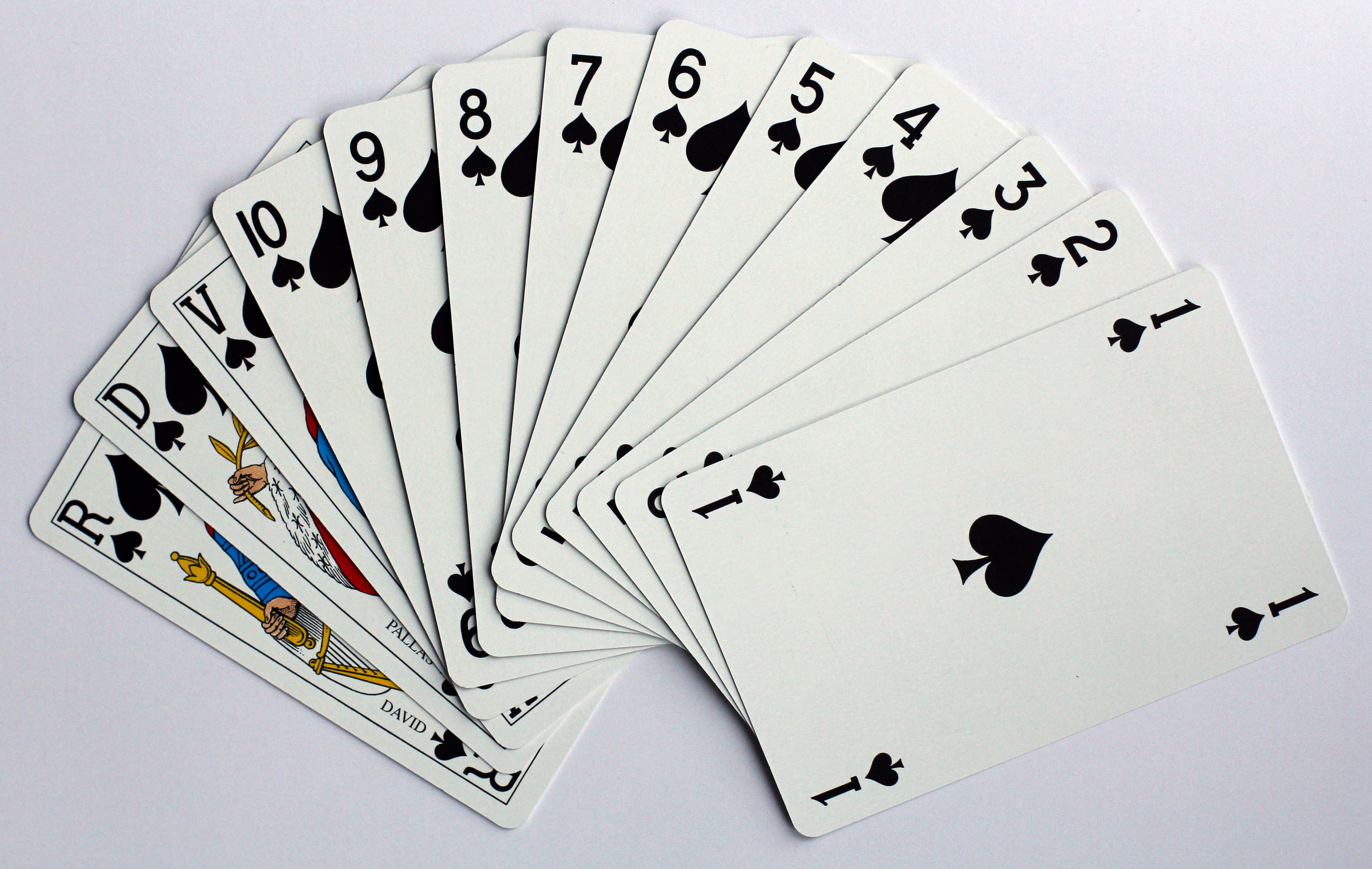
- Suit of Spades from a 52-card French pack.
- Origin: France
- Type: Shedding game
- Players: 3–6
- Cards: 52
- Deck: French-suited, Paris pattern
- Play: Anticlockwise

Related games
- Hoc Mazarin, Comet, Nain Jaune

Emprunt is an historical French card game of the Hoc family for three to six players that dates to at least the early 18th century.

== History ==
The earliest account of the rules of Emprunt date to 1718 and the game continues to be regularly included in French games compendia until the late 19th century but now appears obsolete. The name Emprunt means "loan" and stems from the "borrowing" feature of the game.

== Rules ==
The 1718 Académie Universelle des Jeux does not give a full account of the rules, describing the game as having "a lot of similarity to Hoc" but named Emprunt because it contains the distinguishing feature that players are allowed to "borrow" a card they do not have. The following rules are based on Lacombe (1800).

Emprunt may be played by three to six players using a standard French-suited pack of 52 cards. If six play, each is dealt eight cards with four going to the talon; if five play, each receives ten and there are two in the talon. If four play, the aces and twos are removed, reducing the pack to 44 cards; each player receives ten and four are left to the talon. If three play, the threes are also removed, leaving 40 cards in the pack; each player is dealt 21 and there is a talon of four.

The cards having been dealt, each player antes one or two jetons of an agreed value to the pool (poule). Players draw lots for first dealer, the one with the lowest having this privilege. (Note: Lacombe does not state how lots are drawn.) The dealer shuffles, has the cards cutting by the player to the left and then deals the requisite number of cards in anticlockwise order beginning with first hand, the player to the right.

First hand leads with any card from their hand. Second hand must follow this with the next card in suit sequence; (Note: Rules vary as to whether this is in ascending or descending sequence, but none is clear on whether sequences may turn the corner or whether fresh sequences in the same suit may be started. Lacombe is silent on these points.) if he does not hold it, he must "borrow" it from the player who has it and pay a jeton for it to that player. If no player has it, the player draws the card from the talon (wherein it must lie) and pays a jeton to the pool. Once the first suit is exhausted, the player who played the last card of that suit begins a new suit with any card held.

The first player to shed all their hand cards wins the game, sweeps the pool and receives from each opponent as many jetons as the opponent has cards left in hand.

== Bibliography ==
- _ (1718). Académie Universelle des Jeux. Théodore Le Gras, Paris.
- Lacombe, Jacques (1800). Encyclopédie Méthodique: Dictionaire des Jeux. Padoue.
- Moulidars, Th. de (1888). Grande Encyclopédie Méthodique. Paris.
