= Red nines =

Card game

Red Nines
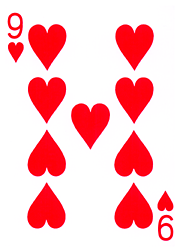
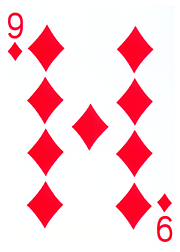
- The red nines
- Origin: England
- Type: Stops group
- Players: 4–8
- Age range: 5+
- Cards: 52 (4 players)
- Deck: French
- Rank (high→low): K Q J 10–2 A
- Play: Clockwise
- Chance: High

Related games
- Comet

Red Nines is a simple card game of the Stops family for four or more players. It is largely a game of luck, and is suitable for players of any age. Games with more than four players are best when played without hesitation. It has a modern variant called Pink Nines.

== History ==
Games of the Stops family trace their history back to the 17th century French game of Hoc de Mazarin, named after Cardinal Mazarin, prime minister to Louis XIV and an avid card player. Hoc was a three-stage game where the third stage involved getting rid of cards in numerical sequence with the aid of wild cards known as hocs or, in English, stops. It was this final stage that evolved into the much simpler game of Manille which was renamed Comet on the appearance of Halley's Comet in 1682, because the run of cards resembled a comet. In this game, the 9♦ was called the Manille or Comet and was a wild card. The entire pack was dealt to between three and five players and the aim was to empty one's hand by playing cards out in sequence up to the King, suits being irrelevant. In 1752, a variant called "New Comet" appeared which used two packs divided for play into a pack of red cards and a pack of black cards and in which the 9♣ became the wild card in the red pack. Comet may well have been played in royal circles in Britain as early as the 17th century, shortly after its renaming. (Note: In response to a question about the origin of the nickname of the 9♦ as the 'curse of Scotland', a correspondent of The Gentleman's Magazine in 1786, states that "when the Duke of York (a little before his succession to the crown) came to Scotland, he and his suite introduced a new game, there called 'comet,' where the ninth of diamonds is an important card. The Scots who were to learn the game felt it to their cost; and from that circumstance the ninth of diamonds was nicknamed the 'curse of Scotland'." This appears to refer to James II, formerly the Duke of York, who ascended the throne in 1685.)

Red Nines appears to be derived from the older version of Comet, but with the addition of the 9♥ as a wild card, the removal of certain cards from the pack, the dealing of cards to the table as 'stops' and a requirement to build in suit sequence. Only the first change has been retained in the modern rules, which thus look very like 'ancient' Comet as it was called. It also resembles Pope Joan, which also builds in sequences in suit and has the 9♦ as a special, albeit not wild, card.

Red Nines itself is an old game, recorded as early as 1812 in a diary entry by Miss Fanny Chapman of Bath who described it as "a new game [which was] a good deal like Pope Joan but more amusing." In 1841 it is recorded as being played by British Army officers and their wives stationed in Stony Hill, Jamaica with the 60th Foot. In 1858, it appears alongside Loo, Vingt-Un and Pounce Commerce in Holme Lee's Ashburn Rectory in 1858. The first account of its rules appeared in 1881. The game was still well known enough in Britain in 1908 to be mentioned without explanation in a novel Lady Julia's Emerald as being played by well to do young folk. It is known to have been played in south-west London during the 1950s.

Pink Nines appears to be a 20th-century variant played as early as 1930 and still listed in games compendia. (Note: For example, see Parlett (2008), p. 441.)

== Red Nines (1881) ==
The following description is based on H.K. (1881).

=== Overview ===
Red Nines is a round game playable by "any number of players". This description assumes eight. The aim is to be first to get rid of one's hand cards. Deal and play are clockwise and the deal rotates to the left after each game.

=== Equipment ===
A standard 52-card pack is used with the 2s and 3s removed to leave 44 cards. The red nines – 9♥ and 9♦ – are wild. Players receive e.g. 36 counters which are worth an agreed rate.

=== Deal ===
The cards are dealt singly and the first player to receive a Knave deals first. The dealer dresses two pools: the Red Nine pool with e.g. 6 counters and the Red Ace pool with half that number. The dealer shuffles and has the cards cut before dealing five cards to each player in turn and placing the remaining 4 cards face down on the table. Only the dealer may view the table cards.

=== Play ===
Eldest hand begins by playing any card to the table, face up, and following it if possible with further cards in ascending suit sequence. Aces and Kings are stops and allow a new sequence to be started. (Note: Aces are stops of course because the 2s and 3s have been removed.) The sequences are arranged in rows with the cards overlapping.

If a sequence cannot be continued because the required card is one of the table cards, the dealer (who knows what they are) cries "stop" and the player of the last card may start a new sequence, just as if an Ace or King had been played.

A player who is able to play the two red Aces sweeps the contents of the Red Ace pool.

=== Winning and settlement of the score ===
The aim is to be first to shed all one's cards. The player who achieves this is the winner and receives from each other player 1 counter per card held or 2 counters if it is a red 9.

A player who goes out with a red 9 sweeps the Red Nine pool and receives double payment from the opponents and quadruple for the other red 9 if held in another player's hand.

== Red Nines (20th century) ==
=== Overview ===
The aim is to have the lowest possible score by discarding as many cards as possible. At the end of each round of play, the value of the cards remaining in a player's hand counts against them. The player who ends the round by discarding the last of his or her cards scores zero in that round. Players play the number of rounds equal to the number of players. Deal and play are clockwise.

The main differences from the 19th century game are that:

- No cards are removed from the pack; thus Aces are not stops
- All cards are dealt and there are no table cards as stops
- Suits are irrelevant
- There are no pools or bonuses for 2 Aces or going out with a red 9

=== Cards ===
Four players use a complete 52-card pack (without jokers); an extra suit is added for each additional player. With an even number of players there should be an equal numbers of red and black suits. With an odd number of players there should be one more red suit than black suits.

=== Deal ===
All the cards are dealt, so that each player has 13 cards.

=== Play ===
Eldest hand commences play by discarding cards in ascending numerical sequence. (Note: Presumably suits are irrelevant.) The player may start with any card, and may lay more than one of the starting card's rank, but only one of each rank thereafter. (Note: It is not clear whether each card starts a separate sequence.) The player continues to discard cards in ascending numerical order until reaching a point where they do not have the next card, the stop. The next player then continues the sequence if able to do so, otherwise that player must miss a turn and play is continued by the first player able to lay the required card.

Players should announce their discards so that all players can follow what is happening easily; for example a player might say "Eight, nine, ten, jack, no queen". If the next player has a queen, it makes sense to lay it and if possible a king as well. Kings are stops (they stop the sequence) and so, one discarding a king, a player may start a new sequence at any number, including another king. Play continues until one player discards the last card in their hand or "goes out".

Sometimes no player will have the stop, everyone having announced e.g. "no Ten" (whatever the required card is). When this happens the player who was last able to discard plays again, beginning a fresh sequence at any point.

==== Red 9s ====
The red 9s (9♥ and 9♦) are wild cards and may be used to substitute for any card of a different rank. If a nine is the next number required in the ongoing sequence, a player with no nine other than a red one may say "no nine" and hold it in reserve. This could, however, be a risky strategy.

It is not necessary to announce the use of the red 9 to substitute for any other card. The player simply announces the card that the red 9 replaces as if it was that card. It is up to the other players to observe that a red 9 is being used.

==== First turn ====
Being the first to discard in a round confers a useful advantage, especially if the player has one or more aces. The player may, as stated above, play more than one card of the same rank initially. After this, no player may discard more than one card of the same rank at a time (although discarding a king and starting again with another king can give the appearance of laying more than one king as a discard).

==== Winning and scoring ====
Each player has one opportunity to be the first to discard, so the number of rounds equals the number of players. After the end of the final round all the scores are totalled and the player having the lowest score is declared the winner.

Each card from 2 to 10 scores its face value. Jacks score 11, queens 12 and kings 13. Aces, although representing 1 in the sequence, score 20. (Note: An alternative simpler scoring convention, favoured by American players, is for the jacks, queens and kings each to score 10 and the ace 11.) If a player is caught with a red 9 in hand when another player goes out, the caught player's score is doubled. Two red 9s would quadruple the score. Conversely if the last card discarded by the player going out is a red 9 that player should announce "out on a red 9", and the scores of all the other players are doubled.

== Pink Nines ==
Taylor and Parlett describe a game called Pink Nines which appears almost identical to 19th-century Red Nines. Virginia Woolf recalled playing it in 1930 and it was still played in England in the early 1970s when a magistrates court in Bletchley rejected an application for it to be played for money in a pub because "no one knew what it was" and the chairman of the bench saying that "it might be something we would deplore later on."

Pink Nines is only described by Taylor (1974) and Parlett (2008). Parlett confirms that the game is a member of the Stops family, its rules closely resembling those of Manille, also called Ancient Comet.

Pink Nines has the same two wild cards – 9♥ and 9♦. Players ante an agreed stake to a pool, no cards are removed from the pack, four are dealt face down to the table and the rest are equally divided between the players with any remainder being added to the table stops. Play is as in classic Red Nines except that suits are disregarded and Aces, not Kings, are high. If all pass, the last to play starts a new sequence. The first player to shed all cards wins the pool.

In Taylor's account, two or three players are dealt 13 cards and the rest left on the table. If four or more play, four cards are dealt to a blind and the rest distributed among the players.

== Strategy ==
Success in Red Nines is mainly determined by luck rather than skill, although there are some opportunities for strategic decisions to be made. In general it is desirable to discard higher scoring cards when starting a sequence, especially an ace even if the player has no two (“ace, no two”). Deciding when to play a red 9 can make a big difference–they can be very valuable to fill in a gap, but getting caught with one should be avoided.

== See also ==
- Curse of Scotland

== Bibliography ==
- _ (1718). Académie Universelle des Jeux. Paris: Le Gras.
- _ (1752). La Plus Nouvelle Académie Universelle des Jeux. Amsterdam and Leipzig: Arkstee and Merkus.
- _ (1786). The Gentleman's Magazine, Part II.
- _ (1849). Colburn's United Service Magazine and Naval and Military Journal, Part 1. p. 113.
- Chapman, Fanny (1812). The Diaries of Miss Fanny Chapman. 1812 diary. Original held by the Alexander Turnbull Library in the National Library of New Zealand.
- H.K. (1881). "Red Nines" in Chess Player's Chronicle: A Monthly Record of Provincial Chess, Volume 5. pp. 46–47.
- Lee, Holme (1858). "Ashburn Rectory" in Littell's Living Age, 3rd series, Vol. 1, ed. by E. Littell. New York: Stanford & Delisser; Boston: Littell, Son & Co. pp. 105–142.
- Macnaughtan, Sarah (1909). Us Four. J. Murray. p. 143. 'I believe she thought a game called "Catch the Ten" was admissible, but as she could never teach us the rules, we continued to play "Pope Joan", "Red Nines", "Five and Forty", "Loo", and, on birthdays, "Commerce" in the drawing-room.'
- Parlett, David (1990). The Oxford Guide to Card Games: a Historical Survey. Oxford: Oxford University Press, ISBN 978-0-19-214165-1
- Parlett, David (2008). The Penguin Book of Card Games, London: Penguin, ISBN 978-0-141-03787-5
- Taylor, Arthur (1974). "Pink Nines Anyone?" in Games and Puzzles, Issue 29, pp. 21–22.
- Tucker, Eva (2009). Becoming English. London: Starhaven. p. 19.
- Woolf, Virginia (1930). Letter dated 30 Oct 1930 in The Letters of Virginia Woolfe ed. by Harcourt Brace Jovanovich [1975]. p. 241.
- Wylde, Katharine (1908). Lady Julia's Emerald. J. Lane.
