= Malilla =

Malilla may refer to:

- Målilla, a Swedish settlement
- Malilla (card game), a popular Mexican card game
