= Jeux de hocs =

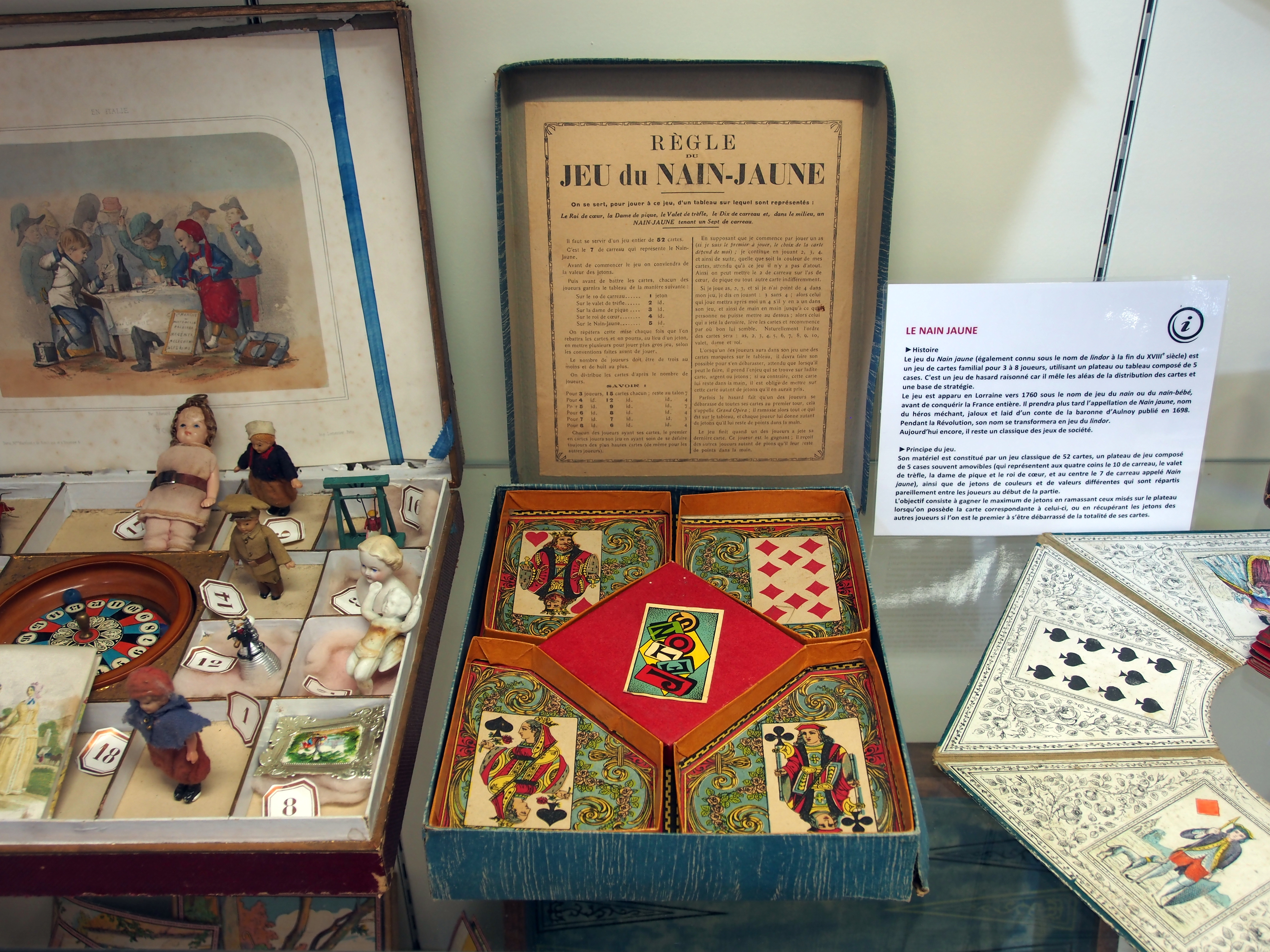
A game of Nain Jaune in the museum at Colmar

The jeux de hocs are a family of French card games in which the aim is to be first to shed all one's hand cards to sequences laid out in rows on the table. They all feature cards known as 'stops' or hocs: cards that end a sequence and give the one who played it the advantage of being able to start a new sequence. In some games, hocs attract bonuses.

The best known of the hoc games is Nain Jaune ("Yellow Dwarf"), which is a classic French family game still played today.

== History ==
The first game known to feature hocs was Hoc itself. This came in two variants, a multi-stake, vying game sometimes called Hoc Mazarin or Hoc de Mazarin and named after Cardinal Mazarin who was known to greatly favour it when at the court of Versailles in the mid-1600s. Another variant was Hoc de Lyon, about which little is known. The concept spread to other 17th and 18th century games including Poque, Comete, Emprunt, Manille, Nain Jaune and Lindor. All except Emprunt are still played in some form.

== Types of hoc ==
Four types of 'stop' card or hoc are distinguished:

- End-of-run hoc. The end-of-run hoc (hoc de fin de suite) is the highest card in a run, typically a King. It completes the row of cards. The player playing it calls "hoc!" and starts a new sequence with any desired card.
- Incidental hoc. An incidental hoc (hoc accidentel) is one that occurs because the next card in the sequence is not held by any player, e.g. because it is concealed within the talon or stock of cards left face down on the table. The player of the last card of the run calls "hoc!" and starts a new sequence as before.
- Permanent hoc. Within a particular game, certain cards may be designated as permanent hocs, for example, the ♠Q, ♣J and ♦10 in Nain Jaune. When such a card is played, the player announces "hoc!" and begins a new sequence.
- Chief Hoc. In some games a 'Chief Hoc' is designated. This has special powers: it may be used as a wild card in place of any other card in the pack and the holder may be allowed to withhold it even if it is the next card of a sequence. In Nain Jaune, the ♦7 is the Chief Hoc; in Hoc Mazarin there are six chief hocs.

== Literature ==
- Frisch, Johann-Leonhard (1746). Nouveau dictionnaire des passagers francois-allemand et allemand-francois. Leipzig: Johann Friedrich Gleditschen.
- Parlett, David (1991). A History of Card Games, OUP, Oxford. ISBN 0-19-282905-X
