= Poch =

Card game, recorded as early as 1441

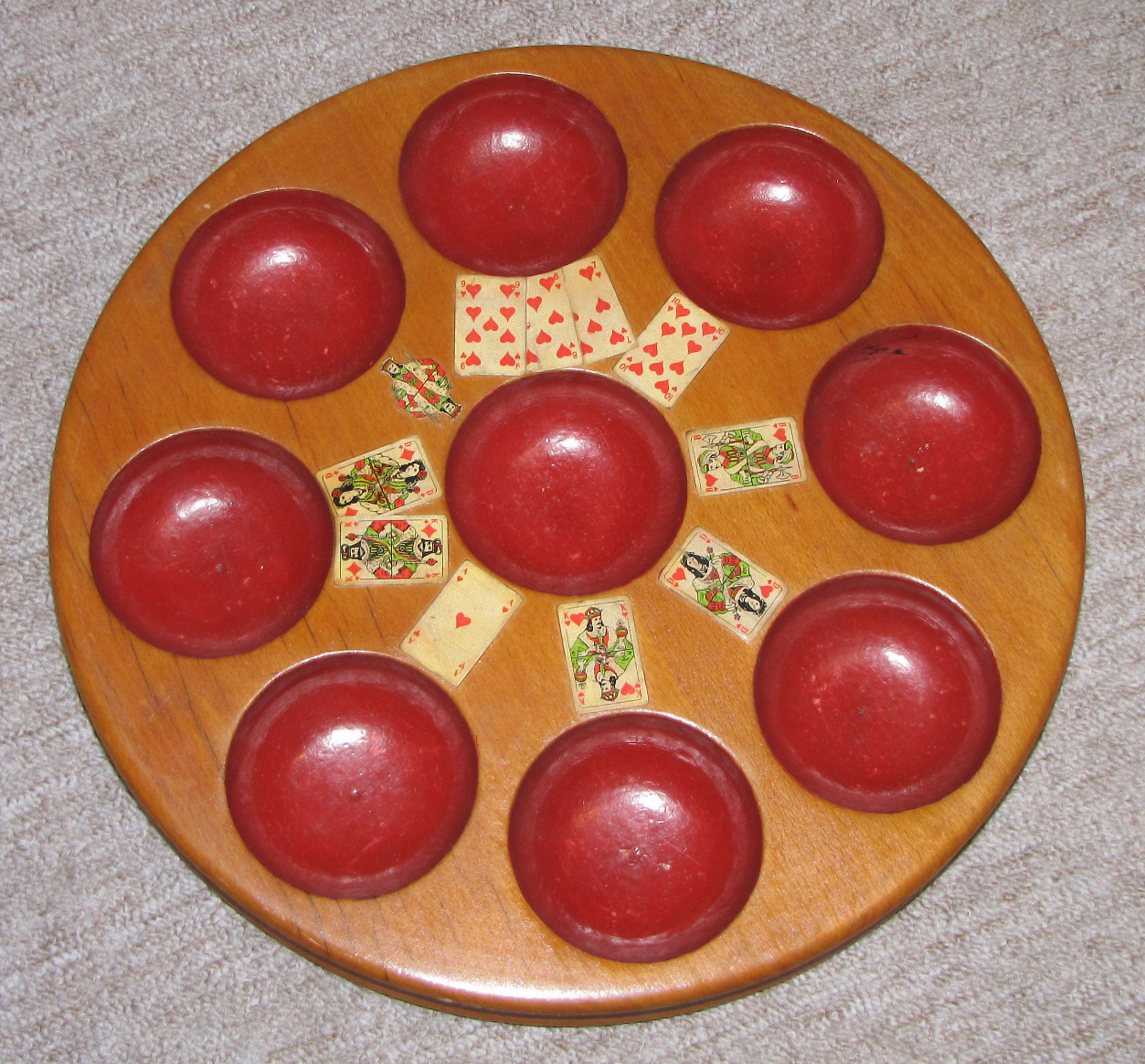
- 20th century Poch board (Pochbrett)
- Origin: Germany
- Release date: Before 1441
- Type: Melding, vying and shedding
- Family: Stops group
- Players: 3–8
- Skills: combinations, chance
- Age range: 10+
- Cards: 32 or 52
- Deck: French or German-suited pack
- Rank (high→low): A K Q J 10 – 7 or 2
- Play: Anticlockwise
- Playing time: 10 min

Related games
- Nain Jaune • Pope Joan

Poch, Pochen, or Pochspiel (French: Poque) is a card game considered to be one of the forerunners of poker, a game that developed in America in the 19th century. An etymological relationship between the game names is also assumed. Games related to Poch are the French Glic and Nain Jaune and the English Pope Joan. Other forerunners of poker and possible relatives of the game are the English game, Brag, from the 16th century and the French Brelan (later Bouillotte) and Belle, Flux et Trente-et-Un. Poch is recorded as early as 1441 in Strasbourg. In north Germany it was called by the Low German name of Puchen or Puchspill, and the board was a Puchbrett.

Pochen is also another name for the card game Tippen or Dreiblatt.

== History ==
A game called boeckels is attested as early as 1441 in a Strasbourg ordinance and surfaces periodically during the 15th century as bocken, usually in the context of being banned. It was mainly played in the south German states as well as Alsace and the Rhineland. By the 16th century the game had become well known enough to be featured in a 1519 satirical print of Emperor Charles V playing Bockspyl with an unnamed Turk and King Francis of France and for an anti-Luther pamphlet to be published called Bockspil. No detailed rules are known, but it is evidently a pure gambling game for any number of players.

The oldest known board or Pochbrett is in the collections of the Bavarian National Museum and dates to the early 16th century. It is square in shape and has 7 rows of 6 cells each, marked out by white lines. The top row displays German-suited playing cards, probably of the Ansbach pattern. These cards, all in the suit of hearts, are the Deuce, King, Ober, Unter and Ten ("X") and there is also a column for Bock (Poch), depicted as a billy goat. (Note: This is a play on words. Bock in German means several things including billy goat.) Other boards of that period were rectangular, often columnar, and with additional compartments for Sequenz (sequence), Braut (marriage) and Trio (run of 6-7-8).

In a 1619 letter, Dorothea, Sibylle, Duchess of Liegnitz and Brieg described how the young noblemen (Junkers) passed their time "riding, travelling, fighting, fencing and playing pranks... at night it's time to play Puchen and roll the dice until the day breaks." She adds that some women also played dice and Puchen "in secret". Koch explains that "Puchen" was a popular card game at that time, but no longer common [in the early 1800s]. The trumps were numbered as in Tarock and were called Puch. The one who led a Puch or trumped another card with one, knocked on the table. This may account for the custom among "common people today" of hitting the table during card games.

The game of Poch went through its 'dark ages' from around 1620 to 1710 when neither references nor boards are recorded, but re-emerges in the early 18th century. This is also when the first octagonal boards appear. These were joined and eventually superseded by round boards in the 19th century. Over the centuries the number of compartments rose from the original six to the nine that are used today.

Pochen was not only popular in the German-speaking area of central Europe, but also appears to have spread to France.

== Rules ==
Poch was and is played in many variations with different details; its rules have changed over time and even the modern rules are not universal or binding like the rules of chess.

== Pochen (19th century) ==
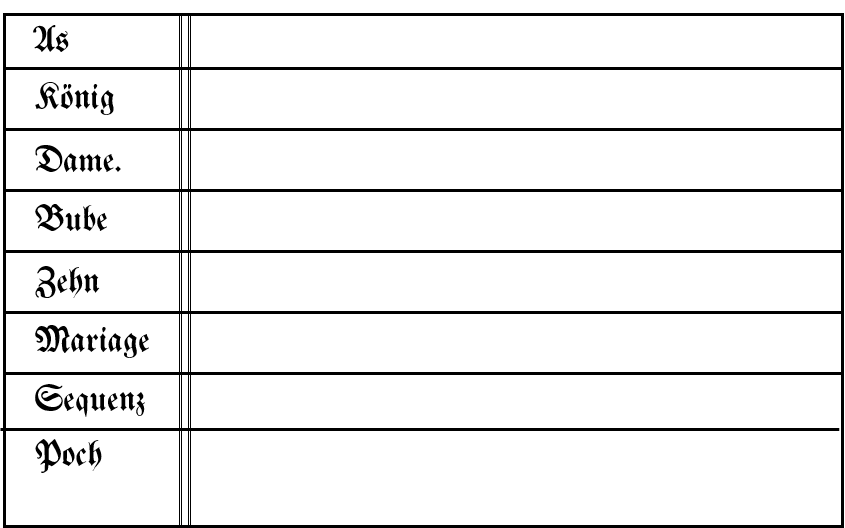
19th-century Poch board layout (von Alvensleben)

The rules reproduced below are based on the description in Von Alvensleben (1853). The board illustrated is of the earlier, rectangular type that date to at least the early 16th century.

=== Overview ===
The aim is to win counters by melding, vying (pochen) and shedding. Three to eight may play, but the game is best for three to six. Deal, vying and play are clockwise. Players required a 52-card French-suited pack and a staking board with eight pools.

=== Preliminaries ===
Each player antes 1 counter (Marke) to each of the following 7 rows or pools on the board: Ace, King, Queen, Jack, Ten, Marriage (K+Q) and Sequence (7-8-9). The eighth row, Poch, is used in stage 2. The player who draws the first Ace deals first. He has the cards cut by the player to the right, deals 5 cards each (3+2) and turns the next for trump.

=== Part 1 – Melding ===
Players show cards or combinations in the trump suit matching those on the board and collect the counters from the corresponding row. A player with the trump K+Q wins Marriage; the player with the highest run wins Sequence; if they are the same, a trump sequence wins; if they are the same and neither is in the trump suit, the player in forehand wins. A player with a Marriage or Sequence collects the counters for the individual cards as well as the combination. Counters not won are carried forward, added to in later deals until a player has that meld and clears the pool.

=== Part 2 – Pochen ===
Part 2 is a vying (pochen) stage where players may vie if they have a set of 2 or more cards of the same rank; otherwise must pass. Forehand begins and may pass or "knock!" (ich poche!) and place 1 or more counters in the Poch row. In turn players (a) pass, or (b) "hold" (ich halte!), placing a stake equal to that of the knocker, or (c) "knock higher" (ich poche nach!), i.e. raise, and add a higher stake. A player not willing to hold a raise, folds and forfeits his or her stake. Once no-one wants to raise further, those who held the last raise reveal the cards they are vying with and the player with the highest set wins.

=== Part 3 – Shedding ===
Forehand leads. Cards rank in natural order and players must follow suit, otherwise cannot play a card at all. The player who plays the highest card wins the trick and leads to the next trick. The first player to shed all cards is the winner and the game stops as soon as the winner plays his or her last card, even if the others can follow suit. The winner receives as many counters from each other player as they have cards in their hand.

== Poch (modern) ==
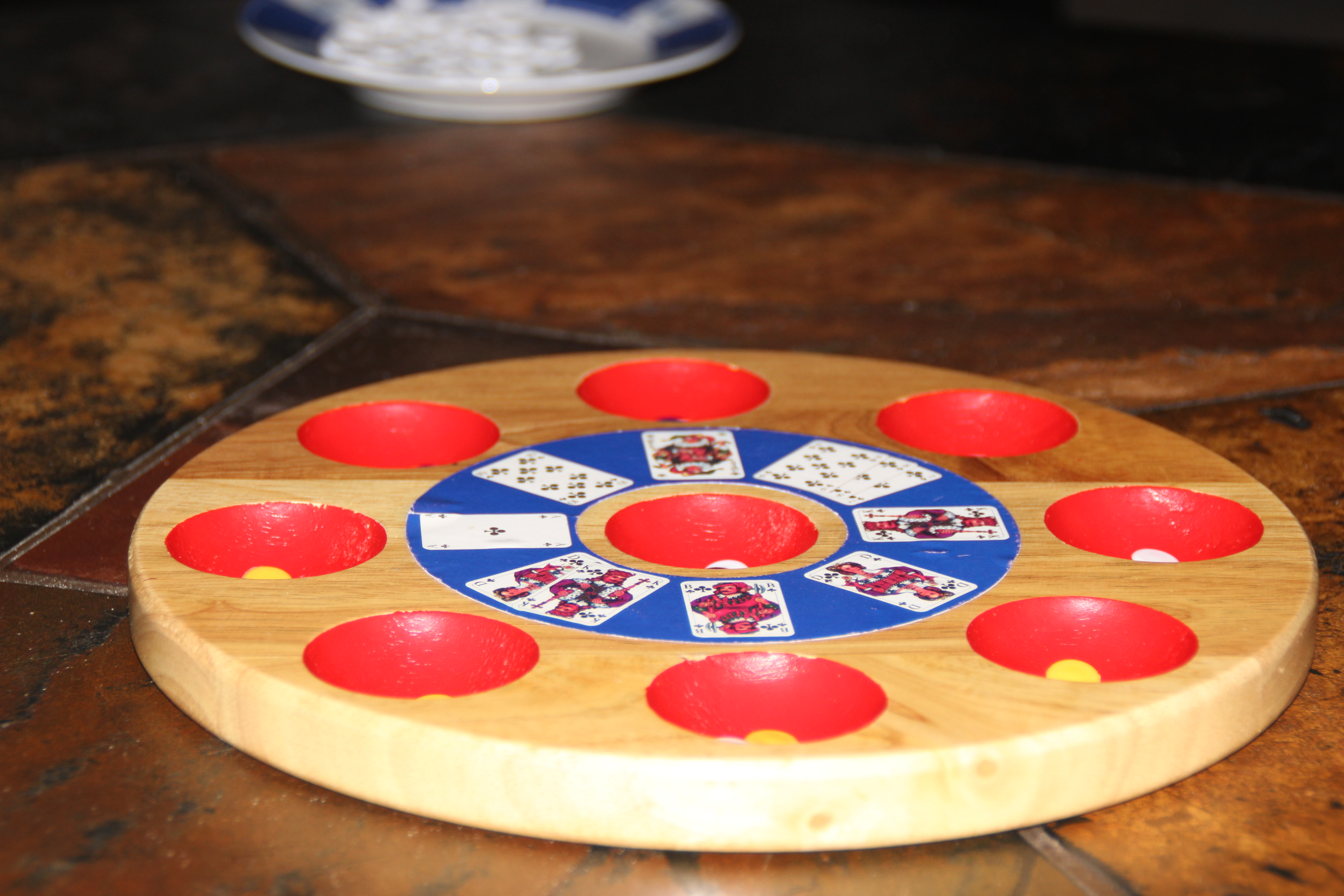
Modern Poch board

The modern rules reproduced below are based on the description at pagat.com which, in turn, reflects the typical rules supplied with the game and in books. The board used is of the modern circular type with eight 'scoops' around the outside and one in the centre.

=== Overview ===
Poch is a family game for 3 to 6 people using a pack of 32 French or German-suited playing cards. If 5 or 6 play, a pack of 52 playing cards is recommended. Also needed is a Poch board (Pochbrett) with 9 compartments or pools into which are placed stakes for the Ace, King, Queen, Jack, Ten, Marriage (King + Queen), Sequence (7 + 8 + 9), Poch (Joker) and Pinke (centre pot, pronounced "pinker"). Deal, vying and play are clockwise.

=== Preliminaries ===
Before the start of the game, the board is dressed in that each player antes one chip to each of the nine. The Pochen receives additional stakes during the 2nd phase and the Pinke is won in the 3rd phase along with any direct payments for cards left in the losing players' hands. The dealer shuffles the cards, offers to the right for cutting, deals out all the cards bar the last one which belongs to no-one but is turned face up to determine the trump suit.

=== Part 1 – Melding ===
After the cards are dealt, the players move to the first stage of the game, melding, (Note: Melden or Ansagen in German.) where they declare their 'figures' or combinations. For example, if a player has the Ace of trumps, he reveals it and collects the amount in the relevant pool of the board. Players with the King of trumps, Queen of trumps, Jack of trumps, and Ten of trumps do the same.

If a player holds the combination of King and Queen in trumps, he receives the stake for Marriage as well as the stakes in the two individual pools for the King and Queen.

The stake on the Sequence pool goes to the player who has the 7, 8 and 9 of the trump suit and is not often won.

If a pool is not cleared in the course of melding, its stakes remain in place and, at the start of the next deal, new stakes will be added to it. A player who wins a figure or combination takes all the stakes in the relevant pool, including any left over from previous deals.

=== Part 2 – Pochen ===
The next stage is Pochen, a vying round which resembles a simple poker game.

The dealer asks "Who's knocking?" (Note: Wer pocht?) Beginning with forehand, the first player with a set (Kunststück), i.e. two or more cards of the same rank, may knock on the table or say "I'll knock!" (Note: Ich poche!) and place a number of chips in the Poch compartment. Or forehand may name the stake by saying e.g. "I'll knock one!" (Note: Ich poche eins!) and staking one chip or "I'll knock three!" and staking three chips. Any player who thinks he can beat the 'knocker' (Pocher) with a better set says "Hold!" (Note: Ich halte!) and places the same number of chips in the pool as the knocker did. Alternatively a player may take over as knocker by saying "I'll knock higher!" (Note: Ich poche nach!) or "I'll knock two!" (Note: Ich poche zwei!), thus raising the stake. However, a player who thinks he or she has little chance of winning, may fold by saying "pass" and drop out of this stage of the game, losing any stake placed to that point. Bidding continues around the table until the amounts bet by all those left in are equal or until all bar one have folded.

If at least two players are left in, they reveal their sets and the highest wins both the contents of the Poch pool. Sets must be either four of a kind (Gevierte), three of a kind (Gedritte) or pairs (Paare). Any four of a kind beats any three of a kind and any three of a kind beats a pair. If the sets are of the same type, the higher ranking set wins; if two players have sets of the same rank, the player with the trump card wins. If all but one pass, the player left in wins and does not need to show any cards. Thus bluffing is possible. (Note: The rules that accompany the Philos Poch board state that if the knocker has bluffed i.e. turns out not to have the highest set, he pays a double stake to the pool before the player with the highest set collects the winnings.)

=== Part 3 – Shedding ===
The last stage of the game is the 'playing out' (Ausspielen) or shedding phase. The winner of part 2 leads and may play any card onto the centre pot of the board. Whoever has the next higher card in suit sequence plays it and this continues until no-one has the next card. The person who played the last and highest card starts a new ascending sequence. This continues until a player runs out of cards and becomes the winner of part 3, collecting from each player 1 chip per card still held in the hand.

== Variations ==
=== Domino ===
Pierer (1844) describes a domino-like version of part 3 where the first player (presumably forehand) plays any card, but typically the lowest card of the longest suit held by the player. The player with the next higher card in the same suit (which could be the same player), places it on the card played, etc. until the run ends because it is either completed with the Ace or the next higher card is in the talon. The player who played the last card may now start a new run with any card. The game continues in this way until a player can discard his or her last card. This player now receives as many chips from each player as they each have cards in their hand.

=== Additional rules ===
According to Meyer, Sequence is generally defined as a sequence of at least three consecutive cards of a suit, e.g. ♥J - ♥10 - ♥9. Sometimes it is also played in such a way that the player who has the highest ranking sequence (according to Meyer) may collect the stakes from the Sequence pool. Here, a longer sequence beats a shorter sequence, a higher sequence beats a lower sequence, if both sequences are of equal length and ran, Trumps beat the other suit; if that does not make a difference, then the player closer to the left of the dealer wins.

== Gallery ==
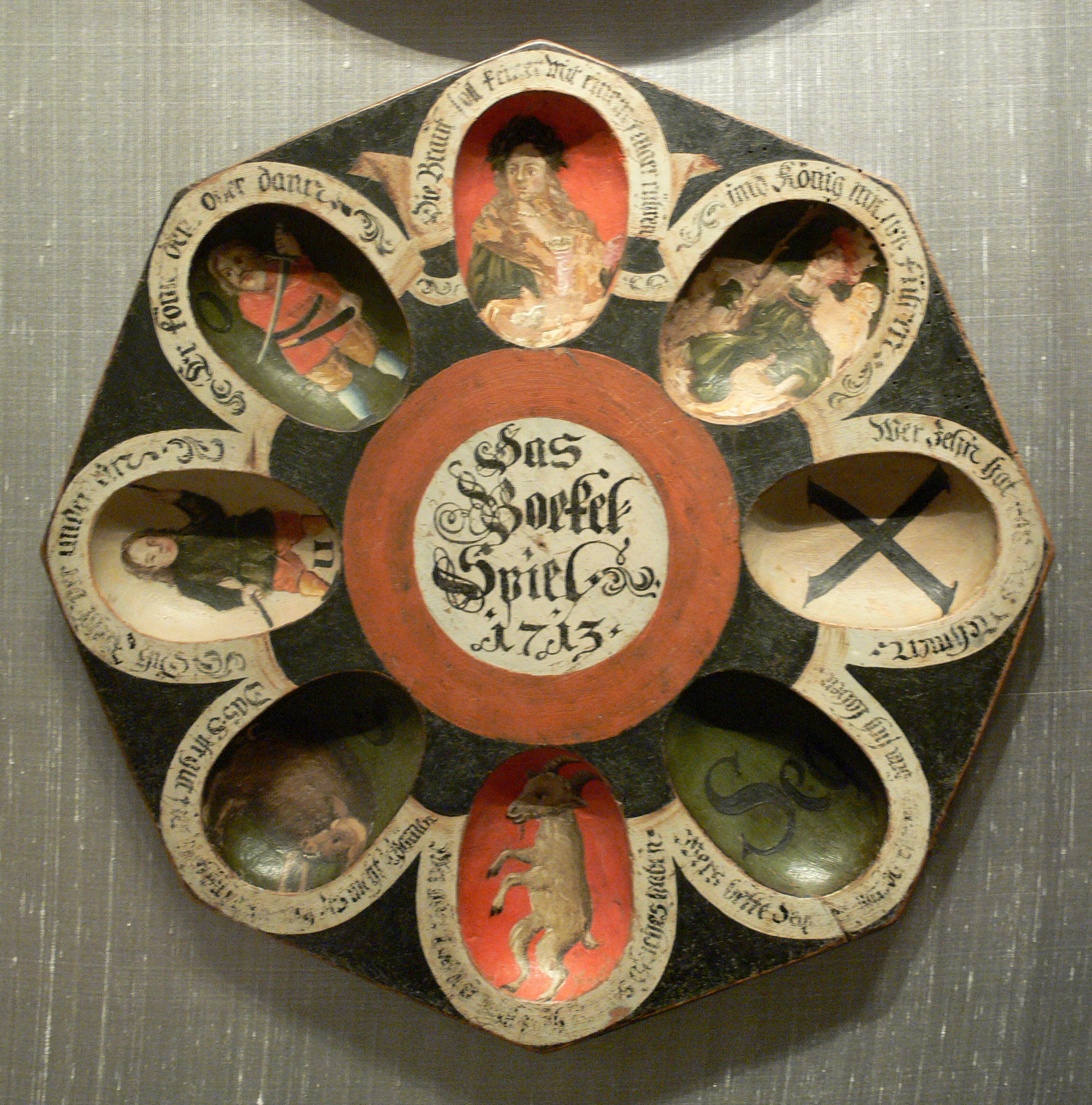
Poch ("Bockel") board, south German, 1713

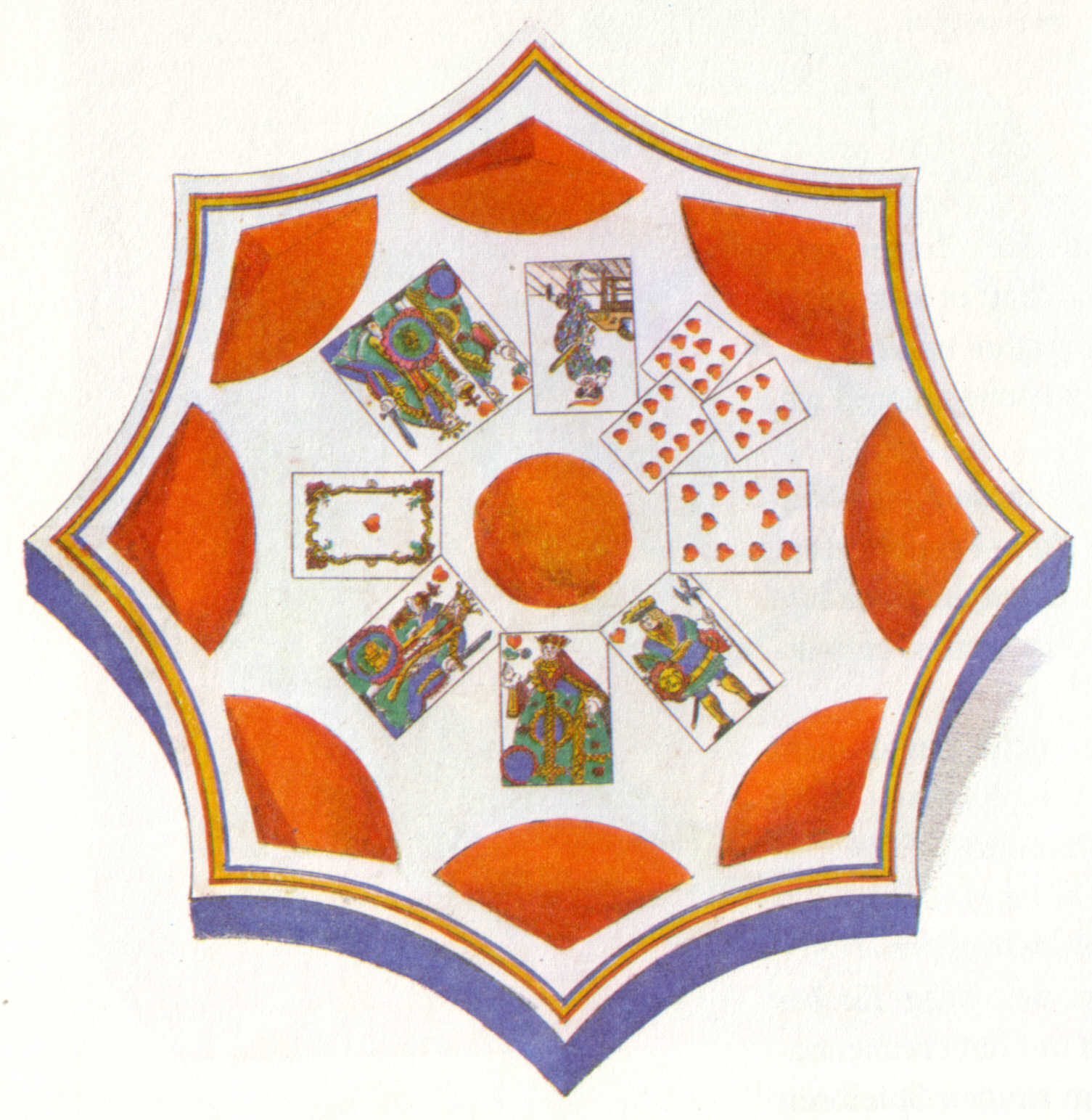
Poch board, Nuremberg, 19th century

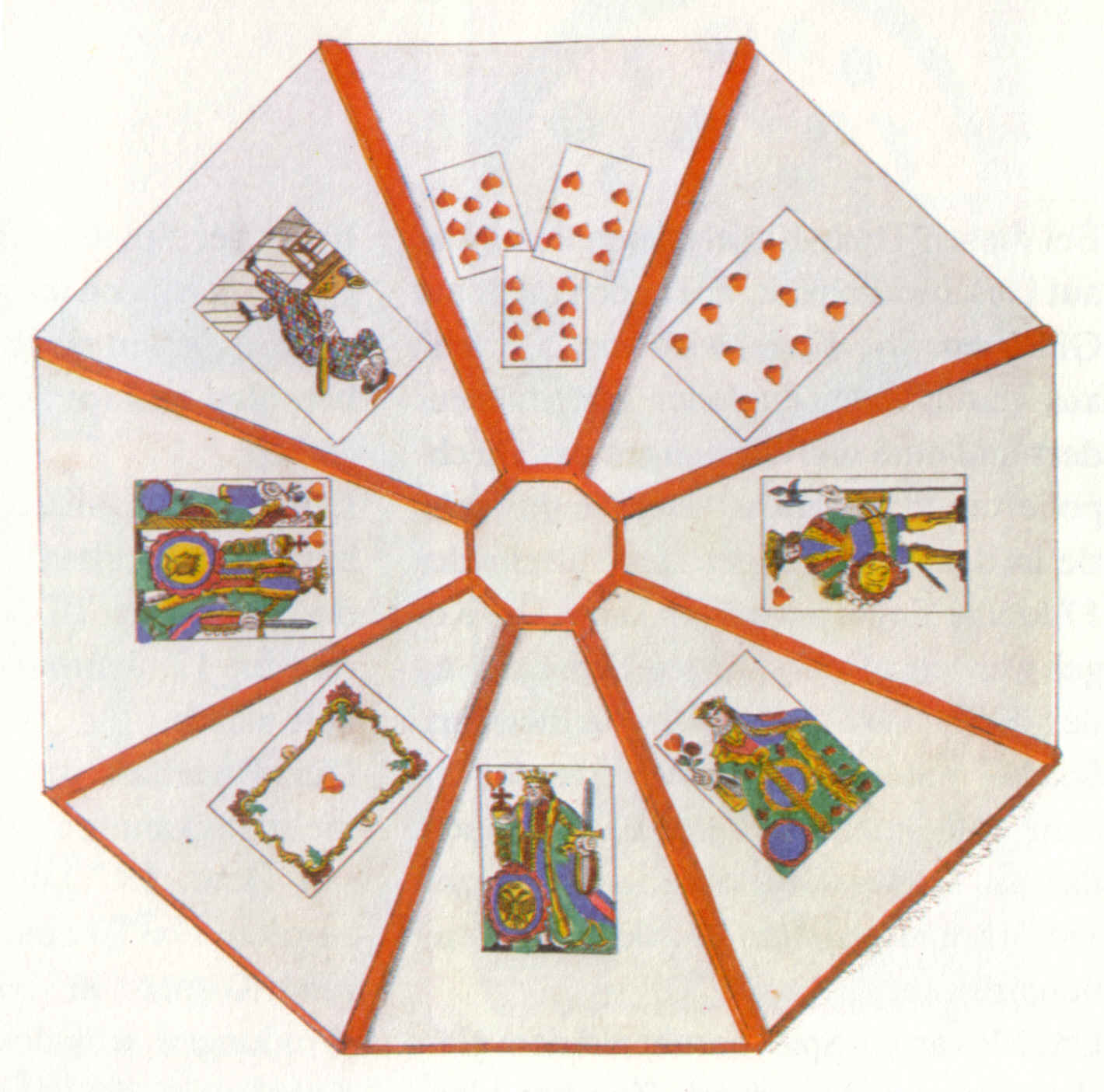
Poch board, Nuremberg, 19th century

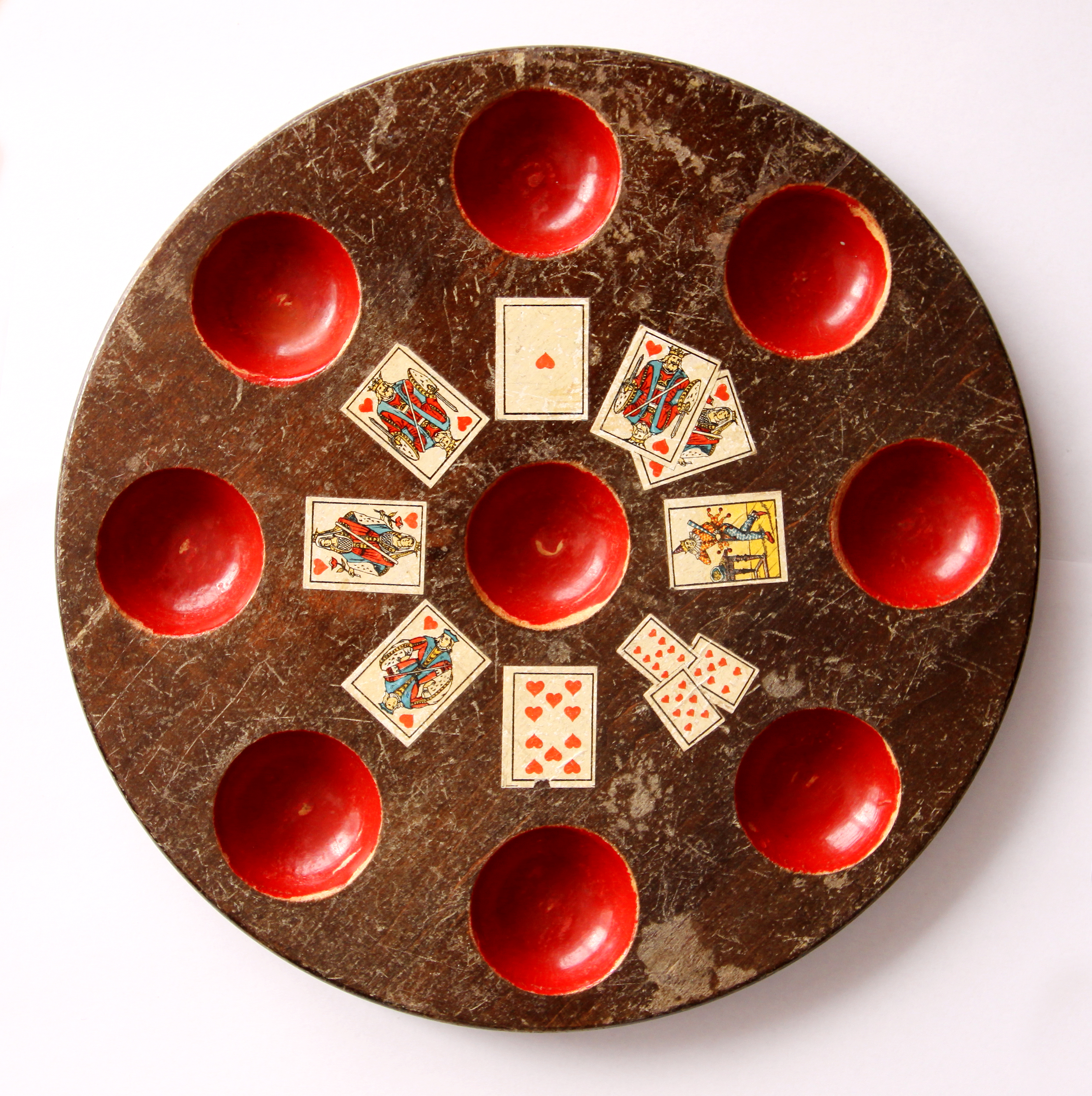
Poch board, 20th century

== Literature ==
- Depaulis, Thierry (1990). "Pochspiel: an 'International' Card Game of the 15th Century – Part I" in The Playing-Card, Vol. 19, No. 2 (November 1990), pp. 52–67.
- Depaulis, Thierry (1991a). "Pochspiel: an 'International' Card Game of the 15th Century – Part II (The Puzzle of Glic)" in The Playing-Card, Vol. 19, No. 3 (February 1991), pp. 77–87.
- Depaulis, Thierry (1991a). "Pochspiel: an 'International' Card Game of the 15th Century – Part III" in The Playing-Card, Vol. 19, No. 4 (May 1991), pp. 109–117.
- Hoffmann, Paul F (1874). "Der" Meister in allen Kartenspielen. Vienna: Reimann.
- Meyer (1908). Meyers Großes Konversations-Lexikon. Vol. 16. Leipzig.
- Parlett, David (1996) [1992]. The Oxford Dictionary of Card Games. Oxford, New York: Oxford University Press.
- Parlett, David (1990). The Oxford Guide to Card Games. Oxford, New York: Oxford University Press.
- Pierer, H.A. (1844). Universal-Lexicon der Gegenwart und Vergangenheit. Vol. 23 (3 ed.). Altenburg: Pierer.
- von Alvensleben, Ludwig (1853). Encyklopädie der Spiele (in German). Leipzig: O. Wigand.
- Biester, Johann Erich (1809). Neue Berlinische Monatsschrift. Vol. 22. p. 259.
- Schütze, Johann Friedrich (1800). Holsteinisches Idiotikon. Hamburg: Heinrich Ludwig Villaume.
- Koch, Syndikus. (1830). Denkwürdigkeiten aus dem Leben der Herzogin Dorothea Sibylla von Liegnitz und Brieg. Brieg: E. Falch.
