= Curse of Scotland =

Playing card nickname

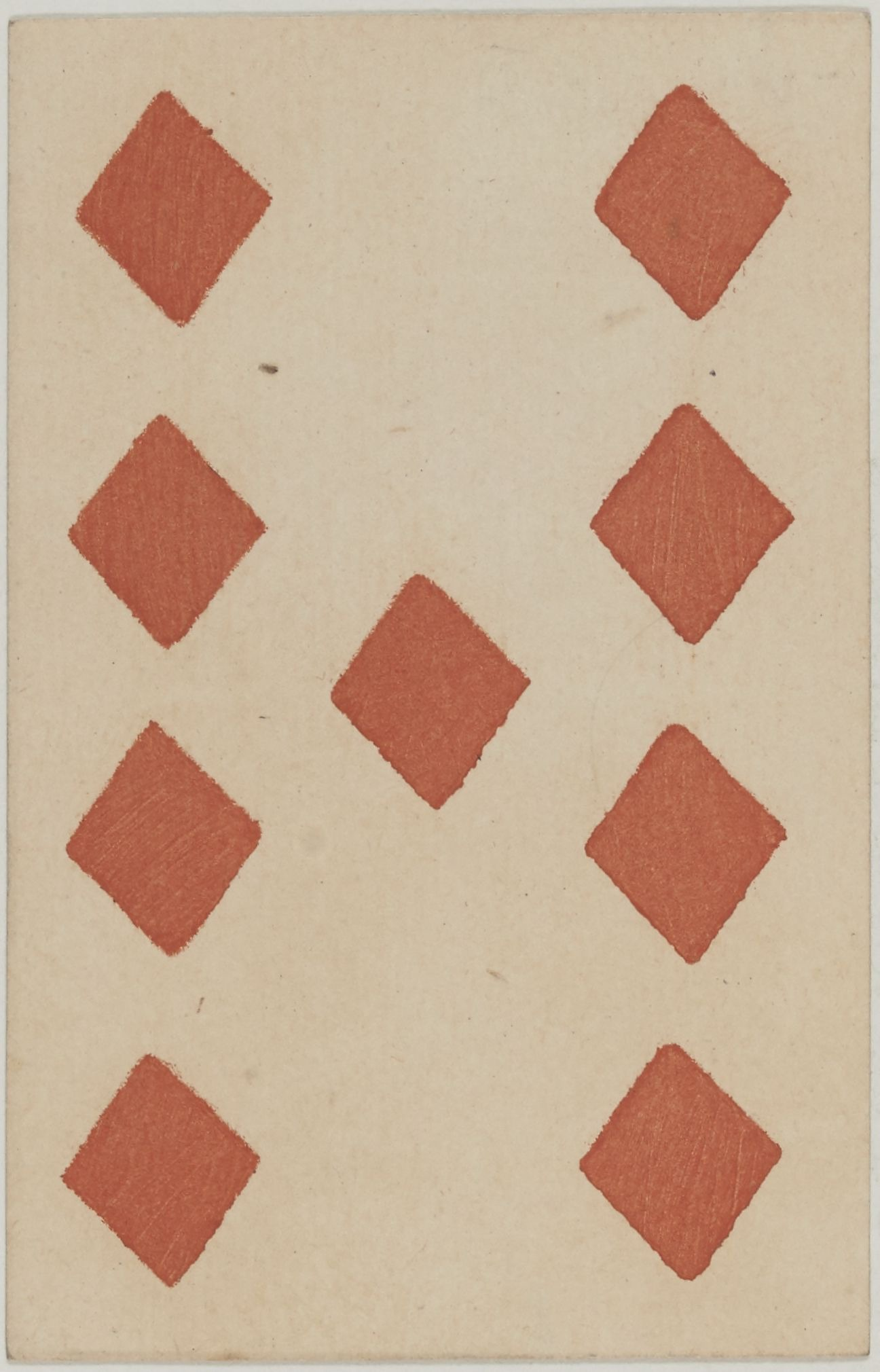
The nine of diamonds in a 19th-century pack

The Curse of Scotland is a nickname used for the nine of diamonds playing card. The expression has been used at least since the early 18th century, and many putative explanations have been given for the origin of this nickname for the card.

A tale of a general who, before a battle, wrote orders on a nine of diamonds card has appeared in folklore several times. The general has been identified with both James Scott, Duke of Monmouth before the Battle of Bothwell Bridge (1679) and Prince William, Duke of Cumberland before the Battle of Culloden (1746). Other tales connect the expression to a decision of collective punishment for theft taken by Mary, Queen of Scots, and to James IV of Scotland supposedly searching for a missing card shortly before his death at the Battle of Flodden (1513).

== Earliest printed references ==
Extract from British Apollo of 1708

In a book printed in London in 1708, The British Apollo, or, Curious amusements for the ingenious, a question is posed:

Q. Why is the Nine of Diamonds called the curse of Scotland?
A. Diamonds as the Ornamental Jewels of a Regnal Crown, imply no more in the above-nam'd Proverb than a mark of Royalty, for SCOTLAND'S Kings for many Ages, were observ'd, each Ninth to be a Tyrant, who by Civil Wars, and all the fatal consequences of intestine discord, plunging the Divided Kingdom into strange Disorders, gave occasion, in the course of time, to form the Proverb.

A similar book of 1726 gives the same question and answer, still regarding the question as relating to a proverb. By 1757 the card was described as "commonly called the Curse of Scotland" with the explanation that the epithet refers to Lord Ormistoune, Lord Justice Clerk from 1692 to 1735, who suppressed the Jacobite rising of 1715 and "became universally hated in Scotland". In 18th-century Scotland, the nine of diamonds was sometimes called the "Justice Clerk", and was considered to be the most unlucky card in the pack.

== "Pope Joan" and 19th century speculation ==
James Mitchell's 1825 Scotsman's Library claimed that the expression originated from the Duke of Monmouth writing orders on such a card before the Battle of Bothwell Bridge (1679). Despite this, in The Spectator, a reviewer of an 1885 book by George Gomme commented that the reviewer had believed that the phrase had started from an order written on a nine of diamonds card by the Duke of Cumberland ("Butcher" Cumberland) on the eve of the Battle of Culloden (1746). However he went on to remark that the book claims that "The curse of Scotland must be something which that nation hates and detests. The Scots held in the utmost detestation the Pope." (Note: The pope was sometimes known to Scots presbyterians as the antichrist.)

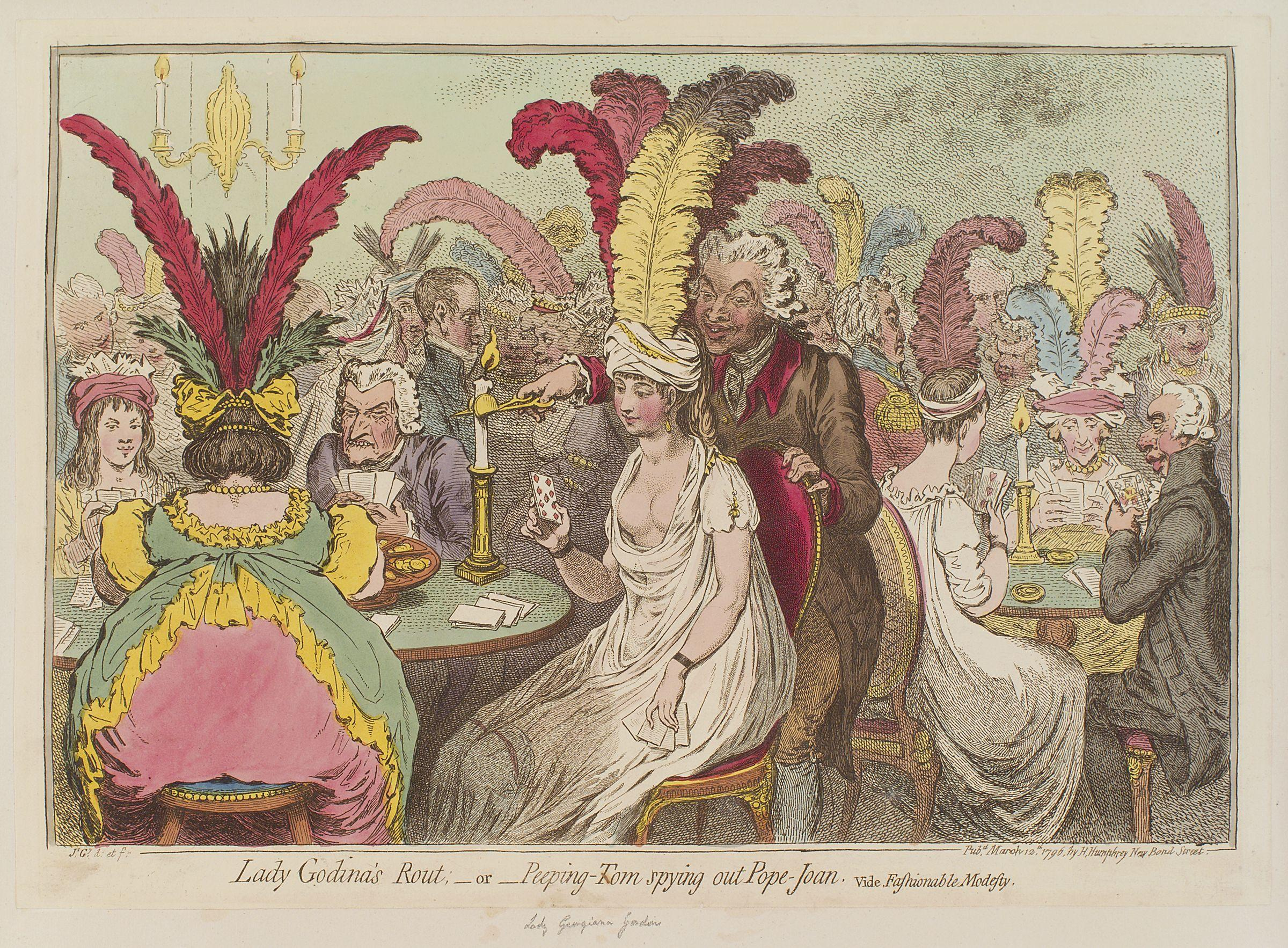
James Gillray caricature of 1796 showing a 14 year old Georgiana Russell, Duchess of Bedford playing Pope Joan and holding the nine of diamonds

In the card game Pope Joan, very popular in the 19th century, 9♦ is the most powerful card, and it is called the "Pope". The game is played on a special board on which the middle is marked "Pope Joan", and it is used in association with this card. The game uses 51 cards (8♦ is excluded, making the 7♦, later called the "beer card", a "stop") but there is no direct relation with 9♦. Gomme's book goes on to claim "At the game of Pope Joan, the nine of diamonds is Pope; therefore the nine of diamonds is the curse of Scotland". The Spectator review considered the claim "more cogent in form than in matter".

Arms of the Earl of Stair. The Dalrymple family arms - nine yellow lozenges on a blue cross - are in the first quarter.

A letter written in response to The Spectator's book review pointed out that the saying was established well before Culloden, and preferred the Pope Joan theory to other explanations. Other explanations given in the letter were:

- That the family arms of John Dalrymple, Earl of Stair, the villain of the massacre of Glencoe, include a pattern of nine diamond-shape lozenges;
- St Andrew's Cross
  That "curse" is a corruption of "cross" and the nine pips on cards were in the form of a St Andrew's Cross (a saltire);
- That every ninth King of Scotland has been "a tyrant and a curse to that country";
- That a thief in Mary, Queen of Scots' reign attempted to steal the Crown Jewels and escaped with nine diamonds, causing all Scotland to be taxed for the theft; (Note: The thief was one George Campbell.)
- That James IV, before the Battle of Flodden, spent time searching for a missing card—the nine of diamonds—time which would have been better spent in preparing for the battle;
- That Mary of Lorraine (others saying James, Duke of York) introduced the game of "Comette" into Scotland, in which 9♦ is the winning card, against which many Scottish nobles lost their wealth. (Note: Many of the claims had been previously published in Chambers' The Book of Days (1864).)

An 1864 book by Robert Chambers, upon which this letter seems to have been based, describes the theories as "most lame and unsatisfactory suggestions" compared with the Dalrymple theory. The book dismisses the Culloden theory because of an earlier 1745 caricature of "the young chevalier attempting to lead a herd of bulls, laden with papal curses, excommunications &c., across the Tweed, with the Nine of Diamonds lying before them".

== More recent opinion ==
In the 1898 edition of Brewer's Dictionary of Phrase and Fable, the "Pope Joan" and "Comette" theories are favoured, although many of the others are listed; more recent editions venture no opinion. In Gurney Benham's book about playing cards, in describing the game of Pope Joan he gives his own explanation for why this card is known as the Curse of Scotland: "The crown of Scotland contained only nine stones, as they never could afford a tenth". (Note: In quoting this, Parlett regards this suggestion as "perhaps the most amusing".) Eric Partridge's Routledge Dictionary of Historical Slang considers: “the various theories are as interesting as they are unconvincing”. Collins Encyclopedia of Scotland states that the Curse of Scotland "is usually taken to be the nine of diamonds playing card, though explanations [therefor] differ".

== Other connotations ==
=== Nine of diamonds ===
The 19th century Tarot of Marseilles is one of the standard designs for tarot cards. It contains a "Pope" card (and, indeed, a "Popess") but there seems to be no connection with the Pope Joan card game, even though the popess may have derived from the mythical Pope Joan. "The Nine of Diamonds" is the title of a book about close-up magic, produced by a Scottish collective of magicians, which includes references to the myths and tales about the card.

=== Curse of Scotland ===
The expression "Curse of Scotland" is sometimes used simply to refer to an occasion of bad luck at cards and can also refer generally to unwanted situations in Scotland, such as swarms of midges.

There is a theatrical superstition, sometimes called the Scottish curse, that speaking the name Macbeth in the theatre brings bad luck. Hence "the Scottish Play" is used to refer to Shakespeare's play.

== See also ==
- List of playing-card nicknames
