= Nain Jaune =

French card game

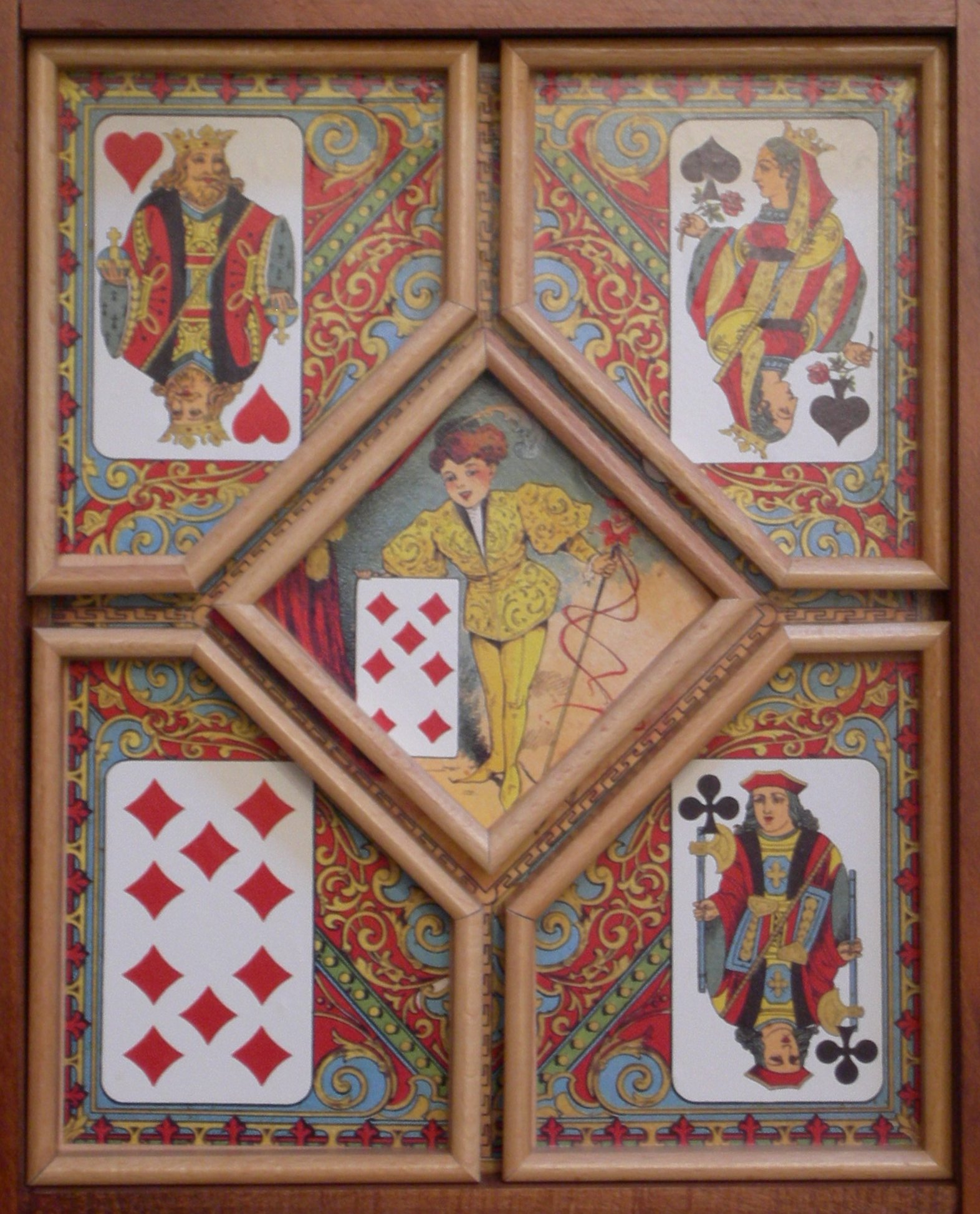
- A Nain Jaune board. The classic French game is named after the ♦7 depicted as a yellow dwarf in the centre.
- Origin: France
- Alternative name: Yellow Dwarf
- Release date: c. 1760
- Type: Shedding game
- Family: Stops group
- Players: 3–8
- Skills: combinations, chance
- Age range: 5+
- Cards: 52
- Deck: French
- Rank (high→low): K Q J 10 – 1
- Play: Anticlockwise
- Playing time: 30 min

Related games
- Poch • Pope Joan

The game of Nain Jaune or Yellow Dwarf (French: Le jeu du nain jaune, pronounced [nɛ̃ ʒon]), also formerly called Lindor, (Note: Lindor is, inter alia, a character in Scrupule ou l'Amour mécontent de lui-même, one of the moral stories by Jean-François Marmontel.) is an "attractive and unique traditional French card game" using a board comprising five compartments or boxes. It is a reasoned game of chance because it combines the hazards of card distribution with the strategy of building suits. Nain Jaune, which is considered a classic French game, is named after the seven of diamonds, which is depicted as a yellow dwarf (French: nain jaune) in the centre of the game board.

Nain Jaune first emerged in the mid-eighteenth century as one of the hocs group of games and is still a popular French family game today. The original rules were more challenging and the game could only be played by three or five players. By contrast, the modern rules are simple, the number of players is variable (3 to 8 players) and the game is suitable for old and young alike. It has been described as a "family game par excellence."

== History ==
The name goes back to a fairy tale by French noblewoman Baroness d'Aulnoy, published in 1698. Le Nain Jaune (the yellow dwarf) is a cruel story about an ugly, jealous and evil villain.

The game of Nain Jaune first appeared around 1760 in the French region of Lorraine under the name of jeu du Nain (Dwarf) or jeu du Nain-Bébé (Baby Dwarf). This name referred to Nicolas Ferry, nicknamed Baby, a dwarf, protected by Stanislas of Poland, Duke of Lorraine. It is related that Ferry became violent and cruel as he grew older and earned the nickname of "the yellow dwarf" after the villain in the fairy tale. The rules, first published in L'Avantcoureur in 1760, used the same general concept and layout as the modern game, but its rules varied in a number of points. The game spread throughout Europe and became popular until the French Revolution. At that time, in 1789, a French games compendium published rules for Nain Jaune – now also called Lindor – that were significantly different. These new, simpler rules have persisted until the present day.

Around 1850, the famous General Tom Thumb, attraction of the Barnum circus, revived interest in dwarves and at the same time interest in the game. The game fell into oblivion again after the days of the Second French Empire (1852–1870), but returned to fashion during the inter-war years. It has since become a classic French board game.

== Gaming material ==
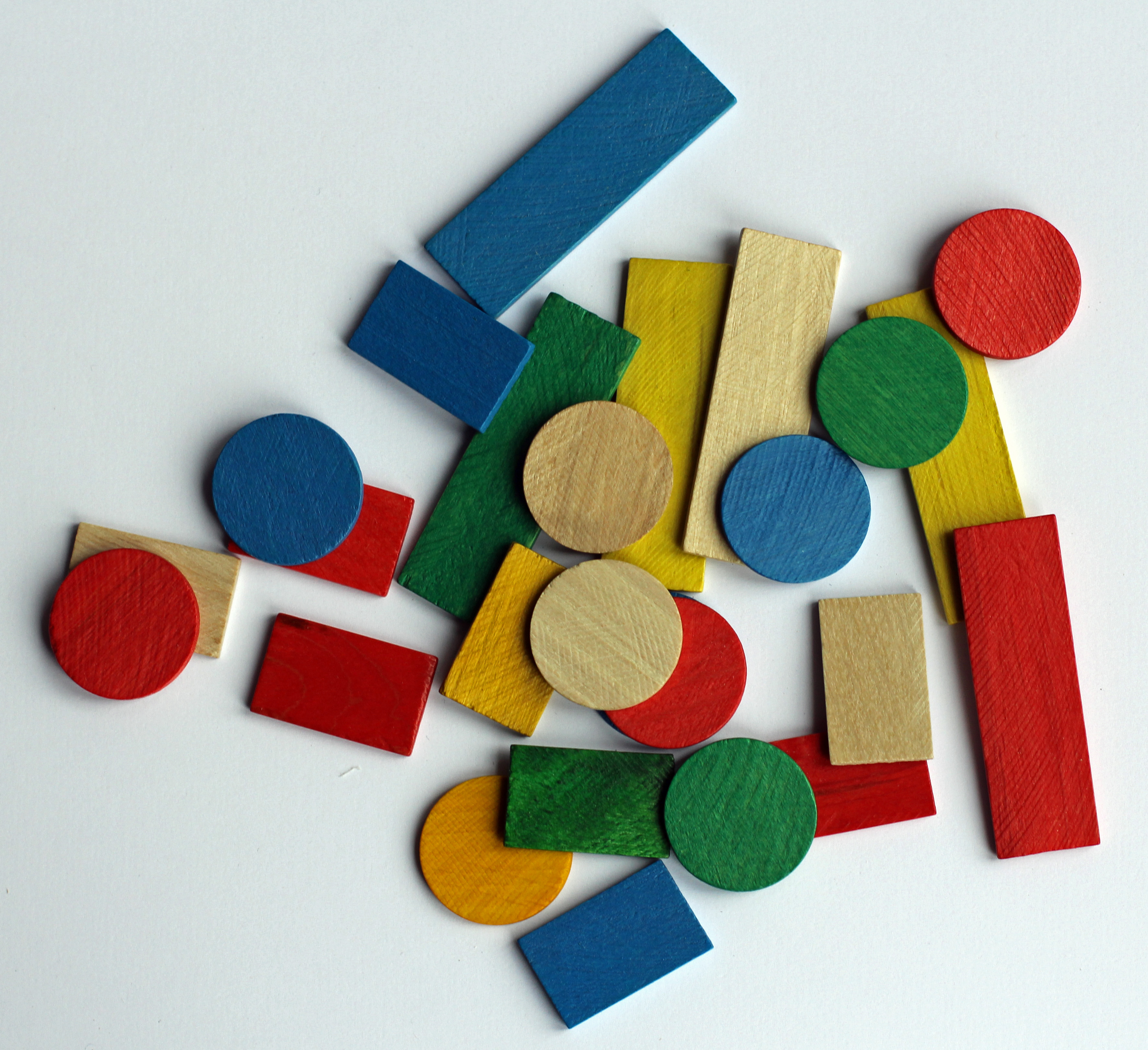
Coloured wooden jetons of the type used in Nain Jaune

Nain Jaune or Yellow Dwarf requires the following:

- a standard 52-card French pack;
- a game board with five compartments (often removable) or "boxes" representing, at the four corners, the ♦10, the ♣J, the ♠Q and the ♥K; and, in the centre, the ♦7 or Nain Jaune ("Yellow Dwarf"); (Note: In the original 1760 game, no game board is mentioned; instead the five honours from a second pack were placed on the table as a staking layout. Although not essential, Nain Jaune boards are nowadays readily obtainable on the Internet.)
- jetons and/or fiches that can be of different colours, shapes and values (1, 5 and 10 points for example) equally distributed among the players at the beginning of the game to the value of 50–120 points each.

== Nain Jaune or Yellow Dwarf - original rules ==
The original rules for a game called Nain Jaune were published in two issues of L'Avantcoureur in 1760. These rules only allow three or five players and are more challenging, requiring cards to be built in suit sequences.

=== Overview ===
Yellow Dwarf is a shedding game in which the aim is to be first to get rid of all your cards. The 1760 version was played by 3 or 5 players using a full French-suited pack and 5 additional cards – the ♥K, ♠Q, ♣J, ♦10 and ♦7 or nain, the 'Dwarf' – which were placed face up on the table as a staking tableau. These are the 5 honours (belles cartes). (Note: Parlett calls them 'boodles', presumably after the American term for 'stops' in games like Michigan.)

=== Cards ===
Card are built in suit sequence, unlike modern Nain Jaune in which suits are irrelevant. Within each suit, cards rank in their natural order, from lowest to highest: One (Note: In French packs the lowest card is marked with a "1" (not an "A") and was called the un ('one').) to King. Certain cards were stops, i.e. they 'stop' the sequence, and are known as hocs. The three permanent hocs are the ♠Q, the ♣J and the ♦10. The 'Chief Hoc' (hoc principal) was the Dwarf, the ♦7, and the four Kings were 'end-of-run' hocs (hocs de fin de suite).

=== Deal and play ===
Deal and play are anti-clockwise. If three play, dealer deals 15 cards, individually, to each. If five play, 9 cards are dealt to each player. The remaining 7 cards are placed face down to one side as the talon and are not used during the deal. Any card in the talon can act, in effect, as a 'stop' or 'incidental hoc' (hoc accidentel), preventing sequences from being completed.

Eldest hand plays a card to the table to start the first run, calling out its name, e.g. "One" and may follow it by laying off the next higher card of the same suit if they have it e.g. "...Two". A player may keep on adding cards until unable to continue the sequence e.g. "...Three, Four and without (sans) Five". A player does not have to start with the lowest card. In turn, the other players continue to lay off as many cards as they can to the same suit sequence or say "pass" if unable. When a King is played to complete the run, the player calls "Hoc!" and may begin a new sequence with a card of any rank and suit. Equally if no player can continue a sequence because the wanted card is in the talon, the player of the last (highest) card in the existing sequence calls "Hoc!" and may start another sequence. The player of a permanent hoc does the same. If a player has the Chief Hoc, it is wild and may therefore be played at any time; equally it does not have to be played even if it is the next in sequence.

=== Scoring ===
Dealer antes 15 counters to the board as follows: 1 on the ♦10, 2 on the ♣J, 3 on the ♠Q, 4 on the ♥K and 5 on the ♦7.

During the game, a player playing a hoc (i.e. a King or an honour) and announcing it receives 1 counter from each of the other players. A player playing an honour and announcing it wins the contents of the corresponding box as well. A player who forgets to announce a hoc, forfeits the stake that would have been won and it remains in situ.

The winner is the first player to go out having got rid of all cards. The remaining players tot up their card points: courts being worth 10, Aces 1 and all other cards scoring their face value. The winner is paid by each player the number of counters corresponding to the card points of cards left that player's hand. A player still holding the ♦7 at the end pays double. A player still holding an honour, is bête and has to double the stake in the corresponding box. If the winner managed to shed all cards without any of the other players being able to play at least one – this is an Opera – and the losers pay double.

Because only the dealer pays an ante, a game comprises a fixed number of rounds, typically 10 (5 players) or 12 (3 players).

== Lindor, Nain Jaune or Yellow Dwarf – modern rules ==
Rules for the easier, modern version of the game were first published in 1789 under the name of "Lindor or Nain Jaune" and are still used today. They are also summarised on the website of the Academy of Forgotten Games (Academie des jeux oubliées).

=== Overview ===
The later game uses a bespoke board with five removable compartments or "boxes" decorated with imagery and the pictures of the 5 honour cards. In the centre is an image of a dwarf holding in his hand the ♦7 and, in each of the four corners, is depicted one of the other honours: the ♥K, the ♠Q, the ♣J and the ♦10.

Key differences from the original game include:

- Any number of players from three to eight may play
- Suits are irrelevant and so there is no requirement to follow suit
- All players ante stakes to the board, and hence a game can comprise any number of deals
- There are no permanent hocs nor a Chief Hoc
- There are no payments during the game except for the honours
- The payment system at the end of a deal is different

The game is less intricate and challenging and appears to have been designed to be speeded up with restrictions on the number of deals and players removed and the stakes greatly raised to increase its gambling potential.

=== Preliminaries ===
At the beginning of the game, each player is given the same number of counters e.g. five 10-point counters (contrats), ten 5-point counters (fiche) and twenty 1-point counters (jetons) each. Then the board is dressed in that each player places counters in the boxes on the board as follows: one counter on the ♦10, two on the ♣J, three on the ♠Q, four on the ♥K and five on the ♦7 or 'Yellow Dwarf'. If there are any counters left from the previous round, they are kept and the new stakes added to them.

The first dealer is chosen by lot. The dealer shuffles the cards, offers them to the left to be cut and then deals to the right, in threes, a number of cards dependent on the number of players as shown in the table below.

Number of players	Cards per player	Cards in the talon
3	15	7
4	12	4
5	9	7
6	8	4
7	7	3
8	6	4

=== Play ===
The game is played clockwise, so the player to the left of the dealer is first hand. First hand puts down any card, calling out its value e.g. "Five!", and continues with the next cards in sequence if able e.g. "Six, Seven, Eight...", regardless of suit. When a player stops he or she announces "no ... " or "without ... " (sans...). For example, to stop at nine a player announces "... no Ten!" (sans dix). The next player to the left continues the sequence if possible and if desired, and so on. If none of the players can complete the sequence, the player who has stopped starts a new sequence with any card.

When a player plays a King, that player starts a new sequence with any card held. (Note: Lacombe says that the player who plays the highest card of a sequence wins the trick, but, since Nain Jaune is not a trick-winning game, it is not clear what the point of that would be. In summarising Lacombe, The Academy of Forgotten Games makes no mention of tricks.) A player placing one of the cards represented on the board, for example the ♠Q, announces "the Queen who sweeps" (Dame qui prend) and sweeps up the counters in the box corresponding to the card. If a player forgets to announce this, the stake is lost and stays in place for the next game. A player still holding one of the honour cards at the end of the game, pays a bête to the board that matches what is in the box for that card.

The winner of the round is the player who is first to get rid of all cards. The winner draws from the each other player either as many counters as that player has points left in hand (each court card is worth 10, the rest count at face value). In counting points, pip cards are worth their face value, courts are worth 10 points each and Aces score 1 point each. A player who gets rid of all cards at once when on lead for the first time makes an "Opera" (or Grand Opera) and, in addition to the payments from the other players, sweeps the board.

When the deal has been settled, the board is re-dressed for the next deal and the player to the right of the last dealer becomes the new dealer.

== Ending ==
The game is over when a player is "ruined" and can no longer place 15 counters at the beginning of the round. Players may also choose a number of game turns or a game time; the winner is then the one with the most counters.

== See also ==
- Pope Joan
- Pochen

== Literature ==
- _ (1760) L'Avantcoureur, 27 October 1760, Issue 41 and 3 November 1760, Issue 42.
- d'Alembert, Abbé Bossut, de la Lande, Marquis de Condorcet, Charles, etc. (1789). Encyclopedie Methodique ou Par Ordre de Matieres: Mathematiques. Paris: Panckoucke.
- Lacombe, Jacques (1792). Dictionnaire des Jeux. Panckoucke, Paris.
