= Manille =

French card game

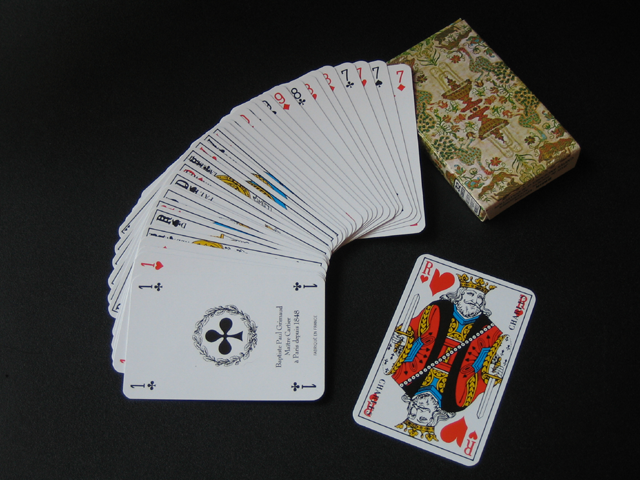
- French piquet deck used for manille
- Origin: France
- Type: Trick-taking
- Players: 4
- Cards: 32
- Deck: Piquet deck
- Rank (high→low): 10 A K Q J 9 8 7
- Play: Counter-clockwise
- Playing time: 15 min.

Related games
- Malilla • Manilla

Manille (French pronunciation: [manij]; derived from the Spanish and Catalan manilla) is a Catalan French trick-taking card game which uses a 32 card deck. It spread to the rest of France in the early 20th century, but was subsequently checked and reversed by the expansion of belote. It is still popular in France (primarily the north and south-west) and the western part of Belgium.

The game is played with a 32-card piquet deck. It is usually played by four players in two partnerships, but variants with two or three players also exist.

== The game ==
=== Manille muette ===
Ranks and card-point values
Rank	10	A	K	Q	J	9	8	7
Value	5	4	3	2	1	–		

The 32 cards are distributed equally between the four players, starting with the player to the left of the dealer, moving clockwise. There are various ways to do this, often players receive two cards at a time rather than just one, until all players have eight cards each. The dealer then announces the trump suit. There are five possibilities, same as bridge: clubs, diamonds, hearts, spades and no-trump. No trump (known as en voiture in French) also means that the points are doubled at the end of the deal. The dealer can also announce "opposite" (en face) and let his partner choose the trump suit. If the opposing team believes they can beat the chosen trump (get more than 30 points) then they can 'tap' the table to double the points at the end of the deal.

==== The play ====
The player to the left of the dealer can play any card of his choice, and the three players after him are obligated to follow suit if they can. If they can't, they can win the hand by playing a trump card or if they can't follow suit or trump, they must discard a card and obligatorily lose the hand. The player who wins the trick starts off the next trick, and so on, until all eight tricks have been completed. Note that the cards follow the normal order of hierarchy used in bridge, except that the 10 is the highest possible card - the order is 10, ace, king, queen, jack, 9, 8, 7. Players are not allowed to talk about their cards during the playing phase of the game.

==== Scoring ====
Unlike bridge, it's not the numbers of tricks taken that decides the score. The cards are all assigned a special value:

- 10 (manille) – 5 points
- Ace (manillon) – 4 points
- King – 3 points
- Queen – 2 points
- Jack – 1 point
- 9, 8 and 7 – 0 points.

At the end of the deal, the two pairs count up the value of their cards and declare them. The total value of the pack is 60 points ([5 + 4 + 3 + 2 + 1] x 4), so to get the opponents' score the players simply subtract their total from 60. If there have been any doubles or redoubled, these are applied after counting the total. Points are scored relative to 30 as this is half of 60. For example, a team that wins the deal 36–24 gets six points (36 minus 30) and the opposition gets zero. If there has been a violation of the rules, for example one player trumping another player's trick when he could have followed suit, the other pair gets the maximum points for that deal (30 points).

The game typically ends in one of three ways

- Players play until one pair has 101 points, the first to this total wins
- Players play 50 deals and whichever pair has the most points wins.
- Players play 12 deals and whichever pair has the most points wins.

==== Alternate rules ====
- In some regions it is possible to call out a 'blind trump' which means that the dealer chooses a trump, usually no trump, before seeing his cards. The dealer gets to lead the first trick and points are automatically doubled at the end of the deal. This means the points are quadrupled for 'no trump' at the end of the deal.
- Some games allow 'double tapping' the table. If the opposing team 'tapped' the table and the trumping team believes the opposing team will not win the deal, they may 'double tap' the table, automatically quadrupling the points of the deal.
  - Some games allow 'infinite tapping' the table. This means that there is no limit on how many times the trumping and opposing team can tap.

== Variants ==
=== Manille parlée ===
A more popular variety allowing spoken communication between partners, as the name implies but what may be said is subject to stringent rules. The leader to a trick, before leading, may give his partner a single piece of information about his own hand, or request information about his partner's, or may even (instead) invite his partner either to do the same or to give him some instruction as to the card or suit to be led. Such information may relate to the number of cards held of a specific suit or rank, or whether a particular card is held. Question and answer must be succinct, explicit, intelligible to the opponents, and not replaced or accompanied by any non-verbal conventions. Questions must be answered truthfully, and instructions followed if possible.

=== Auction manille (1) ===
From three to seven may play, each for himself. Deal out all cards but two or four, depending on the number of players, which constitute the widow. Eldest has the privilege of becoming the declarer. If he declines, it passes to the right until somebody exercises it. The declarer's objective is to take at least 21 points in tricks and cards, or at least 15 if more than four are playing. Before play, the declarer may keep drawing cards from the widow until he is satisfied with his hand. Each drawn card must be followed by a discard, which may be the card just drawn, before the next is taken. When satisfied, declarer announces trump and eldest hand leads. The amount won by the declarer from each opponent if successful, or paid to each if not, varies with the number of cards exchanged.

=== Auction manille (2) ===
Remove as many sevens as necessary to enable every player to receive the same number of cards. Each in turn, starting with Eldest, may pass or bid. A bid states the number of points the bidder undertakes to make in exchange for choosing trumps. Each bid must be higher than the last, and a player who has passed may not come in again. The highest bidder announces trump, or No Trumps, and Eldest leads to the first trick, unless the bid was to win every trick, in which case the declarer leads. The player scores the amount of his bid if successful, or loses it if not. The winner is the player with the highest score after any agreed number of deals, each having dealt the same number of times.

=== Auction manille (3) ===
A number of cards is dealt to each player in a particular manner, and the rest are laid some face up and some face down on the table.

- If three players are active in the game, nine cards are dealt in batches of 3 to each player and the remainder five are stacked, two face up and three down.
- If four play, seven cards are dealt and the remainder 4 are laid down, two face up and two down.
- If five play, six cards are dealt and the remaining two are laid down, one face up and one down.
- If six play, five cards are dealt and the remainder two cards are laid down, one face up and one down.
- If seven play, four cards are dealt and the remainder four are laid down, two face up and two down.

The game is played as in the previous version previously, except that the highest bidder may exchange cards with the widow before naming trumps. In some circles, the score is doubled if the bidder undertakes to win every trick, or plays without exchanging. If both apply, the score is quadrupled.

=== Blind manille ===
This variety requires people to hold their dealt cards backwards so other players can see all the cards but not the player himself. The chosen trump is based on the cards the dealer sees. Players play cards by pulling them randomly from their hand. Whoever threw the highest of the initial suit or trumps the highest, wins the trick.

=== 3-player manille ===
In 3-player manille the dealer deals out 10 cards to all players and puts the last 2 face down on the table. After choosing trump he/she may then choose to discard 0, 1 or 2 cards from his/her hand and replace them with the face down cards (without looking at them). The team that wins the first trick can add the 2 reserve cards to their winnings. The dealer always plays against the 2 other players effectively alternating your partner throughout the game.

== World championship ==
On 7 October 2017 the first world championship took place in Ostend, this world championship is for 4-player manille.

== Related games ==
A version of the old Spanish game of manilla, from which manille descended, is still played in Spanish Catalonia as botifarra. Meanwhile malilla is a popular Mexican derivative traditionally played with a 40-card Spanish-suited pack, but in the US with 40 cards from a 52-card French-suited pack.
