= Cut (cards) =

Splitting a deck of cards by someone other than the dealer

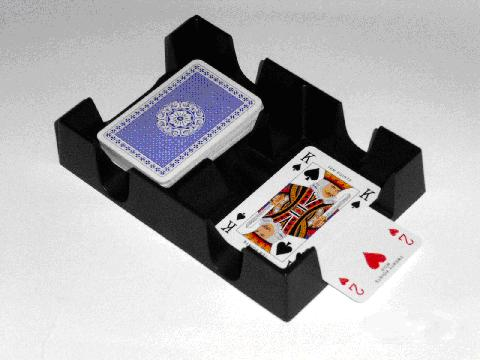
A Canasta tray used in cutting and dealing

In card games, to cut the cards (also "cut the deck" or "cut the pack") is to split the deck into two packets by lifting one packet from the top and placing it face down next to the remaining cards beneath it. The lower packet is then placed on top of it. This is typically done after the cards have already been shuffled, and the procedure is used just prior to the cards being dealt to the players. The aim of this is to reduce the possibility of cheating, for example, by knowing the top or bottom card. Cutting the cards is also a common way of determining the seating order at a card table, the partnerships or the first dealer.

== Purpose ==
The practice of cutting is primarily a method of reducing the likelihood of someone cheating by manipulating the order of cards to gain an advantage. Even if the dealer (or the shuffler, if they are not the dealer) does not plan on cheating, cutting will prevent suspicions, thus many rules require it. Some players also consider the cut to be lucky. David Parlett says the purpose of cutting is to prevent the bottom card from being known.

A secondary purpose is as a form of drawing lots whereby all the players cut the pack before the game starts and reveal the card at the bottom of the lifted packet to determine initial conditions of the game such as seating, partnerships, and the first dealer. The card rankings applied for this purpose may differ from that used for the rules of the game, e.g. with Aces low, as follows: Joker–A–2–3–4–5–6–7–8–9–10–J–Q–K. Alternatively the shuffled pack is often fanned, face down, on the table, with players drawing and revealing one card at random.

== Procedure ==
A common cutting procedure is that after the cards have been shuffled, the dealer sets the cards face down on the table near the player designated to make the cut. This is usually the player who would be dealt to last, i.e. the dealer's right in clockwise-dealt games, or the player to dealer's left when dealt counter-clockwise.

The cutter lifts a contiguous group of cards off the top of the deck and places it face down on the table, off of the deck. The dealer then completes the cut by placing the original bottom portion of the deck on top of this lifted group of cards. Once the cut is complete, the dealer picks up the deck, straightens or "squares" it, and deals the cards.

Rules of this procedure may vary concerning who makes the cut, the minimum or maximum number of cards which may be lifted off the top of the deck, whether the dealer or the cutter restacks the cards, whether a cut card is employed, whether a cut is mandatory or the cutter may opt not to cut (typically by tapping the top of the pack or the table) and more.

== Etiquette ==
During informal card games, the dealer is typically not required to offer the cut, and even if offered, the designated player can decline the request. A player may request to cut the cards before they are dealt, and if a cut is requested, it should be granted by the dealer.

In formal settings, an offer by the dealer to cut the deck is mandatory and the designated player must perform the cut, generally by inserting a cut card into the deck, after which the dealer completes the cut, leaving the cut card covering the bottom of the deck. When the dealer is not a player (i.e. a casino employee), the cut is mandatory and usually performed by the dealer.

Rules may specify that at least three cards be taken or left in making a cut. Multiple cuts may also be allowed. According to Parlett, a sensible minimum cut size is about one-fifth of the deck.

A cut should be completed with one hand to limit possibility of a false cut.

== Types of cut ==
=== Scarne's cut ===
When the contiguous section is taken from the middle of the deck this is called "Scarne's cut," named after the American magician John Scarne who developed it during World War II to help protect servicemen against cheating by unscrupulous dealers. This style of cut is against the rules or considered poor etiquette in some settings.

=== Multiple cuts ===
Multiple consecutive standard cuts are equivalent to a single cut the size of the sum of the cut sizes modulo the size of the deck.

For example, in a 10 card deck, if a 7 card cut is made, followed by a 4 card cut, these two consecutive cuts are equivalent to a single cut the size of ((7 + 4) mod 10) = 1.

- The deck begins in the order, bottom to top, of (1,2,3,4,5,6,7,8,9,T).
- Placing the top seven cards on the deck's bottom puts the deck in the order (4,5,6,7,8,9,T,1,2,3).
- The second cut of four cards puts the deck in the order (T,1,2,3,4,5,6,7,8,9). This is the equivalent of a one card cut.

=== False cut ===
A false cut is a sleight of hand used in magic or for cheating at card games. It appears to be a real cut, but leaves the deck in the same order as when it began, or another order known to the cutter.

=== Joke ===
The command to "cut the cards", followed by someone literally chopping the deck in half with an axe, is a gag that has been used many times in popular media, going back to at least the vaudeville days. Examples include Harpo Marx in Horse Feathers, Curly Howard in Ants in the Pantry, and Bugs Bunny in Bugs Bunny Rides Again.
