= Run (cards) =

Combination of playing cards where cards have consecutive rank values

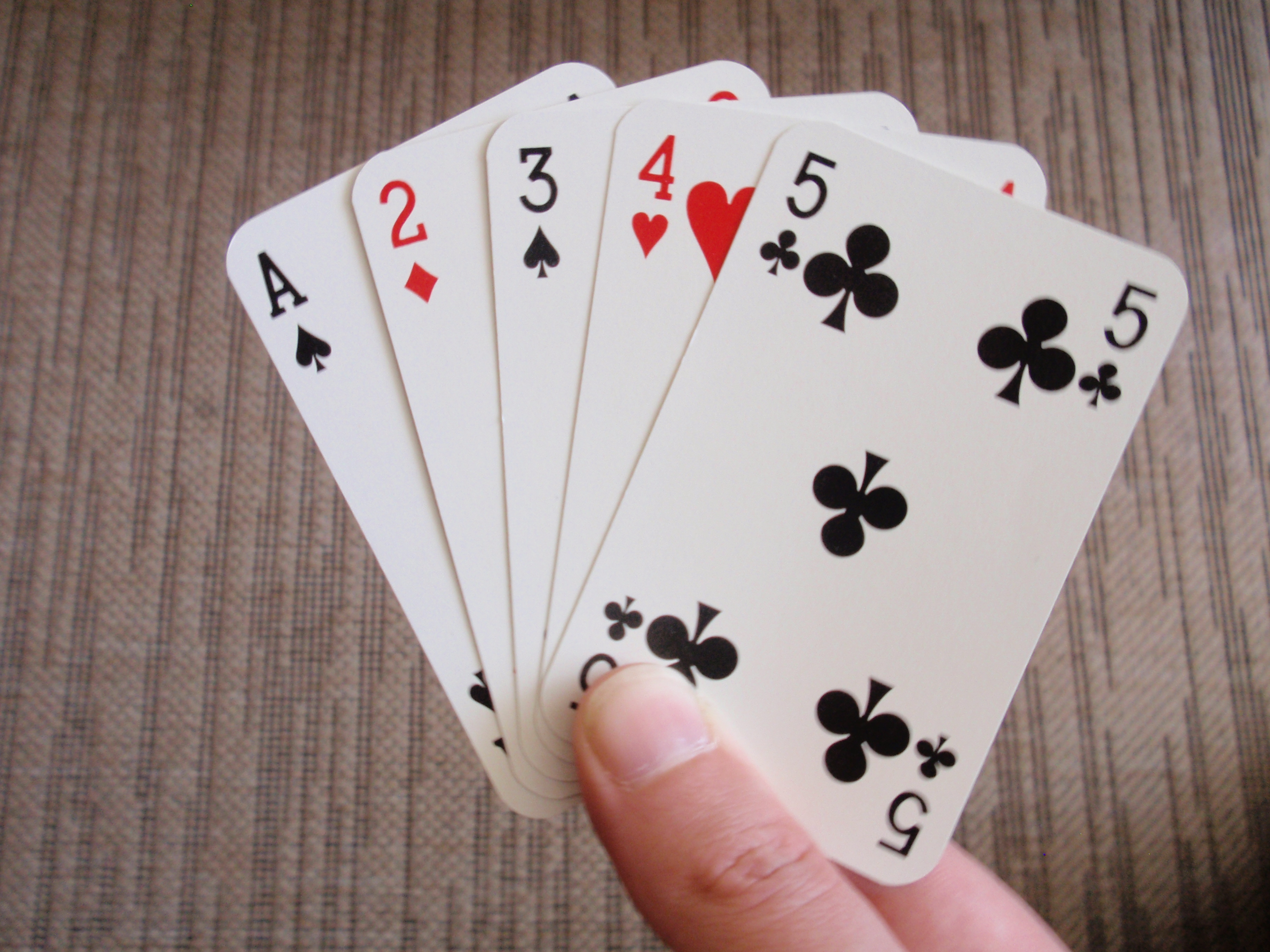
A run of ace through five (where the ace is low)

A run, straight or sequence is a combination of playing cards where cards have consecutive rank values. The cards do not normally need to be in one type of suit. However, if they are, this is referred to as a suit sequence. Some games, such as cribbage, specify that an ace counts as one ("ace low"); others, such as spades, specify that an ace counts above a King ("ace high"); yet others, such as poker, allow an ace to count either high or low.

Runs are one of the two types of meld that may be used in games where melding is part of the play; the other being a set or group, such as a pair or triplet.

A natural sequence, as opposed to one that is wild, is one that consists purely of 'natural cards', without any wild cards such as jokers or deuces.

== Examples ==
Ace high	9 of diamonds 10 of spades Jack of hearts Queen of clubs King of hearts Ace of hearts
	7 of hearts 8 of hearts 9 of hearts 10 of hearts
	4 of spades 5 of hearts 6 of clubs
Ace low	Ace of spades 2 of hearts 3 of hearts

== See also ==
- Meld (cards)
- Set (cards)
- Straight (poker)
