= Glossary of card game terms =

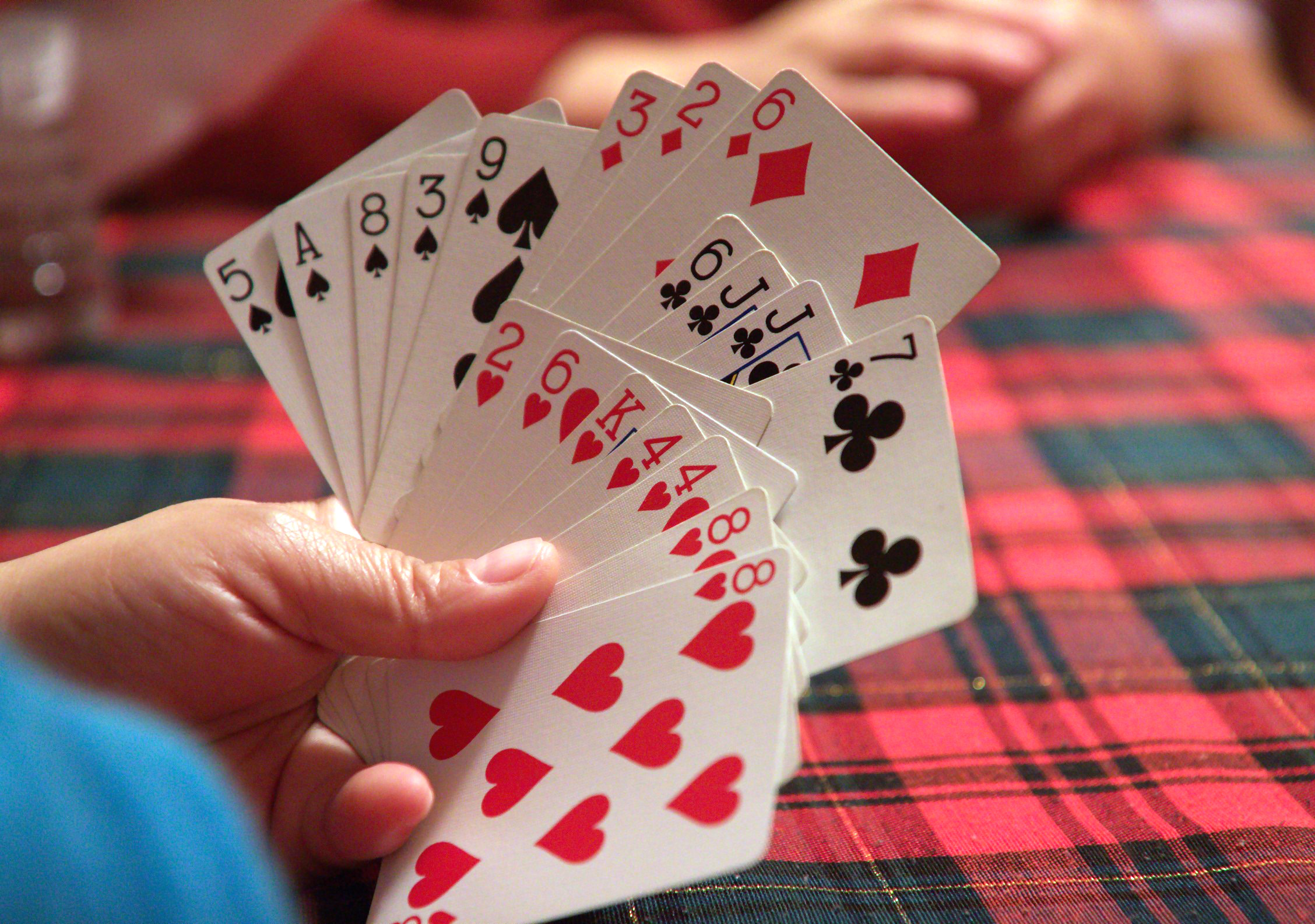
Hand of cards during a game

The following is a glossary of terms used in card games. Besides the terms listed here, there are thousands of other common and uncommon slang terms. Terms in this glossary are not game-specific (e.g. specific to bridge, hearts, poker or rummy), but apply to a wide range of card games played with non-proprietary packs. It should not include terms solely related to casino or banking games. For glossaries that relate primarily to one game or family of similar games, see Game-specific glossaries.

== A ==
ace

1. The card with one pip in a pack of cards. Usually the highest card of a suit, ranking immediately above the king. May also occupy the lowest rank.
2. Commonly refers to the Deuce or Two in German-suited packs which don't have real Aces. Often the highest card of a suit.

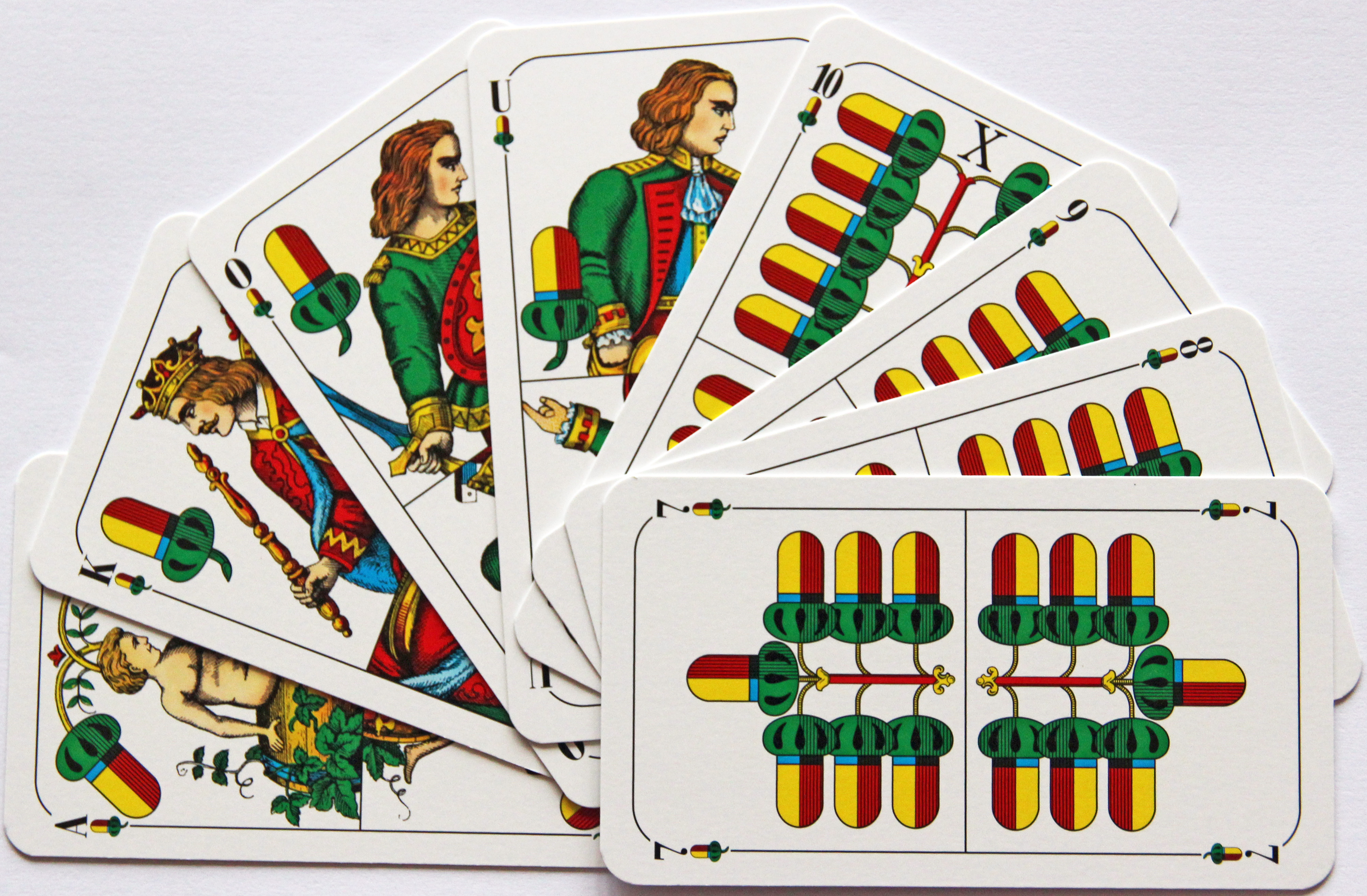
Suit of acorns

acorns
One of the four suits in a German-suited pack of cards. Symbol:

active

1. A card that is in play i.e. not sleeping.
2. See active player.

active player

1. A player who receives cards in the current deal (i.e. is not sitting out because there are more players than the game is designed for as in four-hand Skat or five-hand Schafkopf).
2. A player who has not withdrawn from the current deal but elected to play on (as in Rams or Poker).

adversary
Any opposing player, especially in two-hand games, or an opponent of the declarer. See defenders.

adverse
Pertaining to an adversary or opponent e.g. an adverse lead is one made by an opponent; adverse trumps are those held by one's opponent(s).

age
Order of priority for leading, betting or bidding, starting from the player next to the dealer. See eldest and youngest.

alliance
A temporary partnership that lasts only for the current deal or hand (e.g. Prop and Cop in Solo Whist or the normal game in Schafkopf).

alone
Playing without the help of a partner. See declarer and soloist.

announce
See declare.

announcement

1. Often used in both senses of declaration. However, Dummett prefers to restrict 'announcement' for the intention to achieve certain feats in play, while preferring 'declaration' for a statement that one has a special combination of cards in one's hand.

ante

1. A mandatory stake made before the game begins - usually by all players, sometimes by the dealer only.
2. Chips required to be put into the pot before the deal.
3. To put in such chips.

around the corner
Phrase that describes sequences or runs that are built either side of the Ace e.g. Q K A 2 3 4

auction
The period of bidding. The phase in some card games where players may bid to lead the game, or bid on a certain hand or privilege in that hand such as naming the trump suit. The player with the highest bid wins the auction and plays his chosen game or exercises his privilege. Often used in trick-taking games.

== B ==
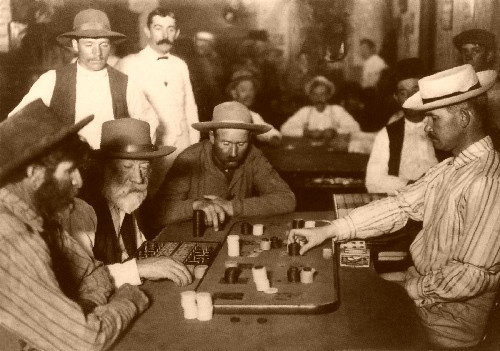
The banking game of Faro (1895)

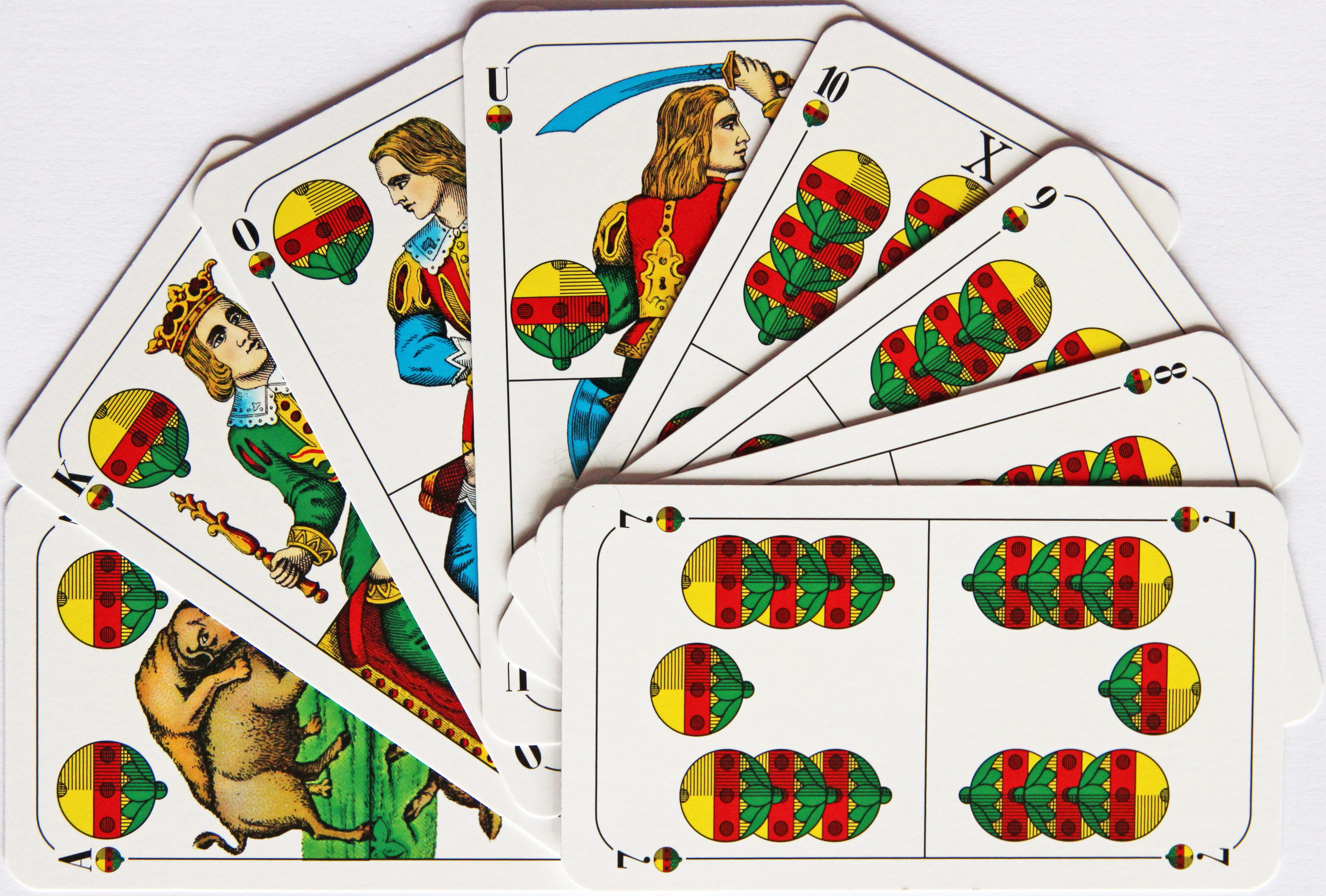
Suit of bells

balanced hand
A hand of cards with no void suit, singleton or very long suit.

banker
Also called the house or the bank, the person responsible for distributing chips, keeping track of the buy-ins, and paying winners at the end of a banking game. A dealer against whom the punters bet.

banking game
A less-skilled card game of the gambling type in which one or more punters play against a banker, who controls the game.

base value
A constant factor in working out the value of a game e.g. Skat.

batch
See packet.

batons
One of the four suits in a Latin-suited pack of cards. Symbol: or

beater
Term used in games of the Karnöffel family for quasi-trump cards able to beat those of lower rank or with no powers at all.

belle
The last game of the rubber.

bells
One of the four suits in a German pack of cards. Symbol:

best
Highest ranking.

best card
Highest card of a suit not yet played. The commanding card, master card. Also king card.

bet

1. Any wager on the outcome of a deal or game; any chips put in a pot; to put chips in a pot.
2. The first bet in a betting interval.

bête, bate, bete or beet.

1. A penalty payment in certain games for e.g. for failing to take the minimum number of tricks, or for a stake or money which a player has lost.
2. A player who fails to take a single trick in Mistigri. Likewise in Mauscheln, if the declarer, or Mauschler, fails to win a trick, he is the Mauschlerbete.
3. Failure to make a contract.
4. Conceding defeat without playing.
5. Double bête: a double penalty, usually for failing to make a contract after choosing to play out the cards.

bettel or bettler
Bid or contract to win no tricks. Also misère.

bid

1. An offer to win a minimum or specified number of tricks or points or the privilege of naming the trump suit or the game.
2. To make a bid.

bidder

1. Any player who makes a bid.
2. The player who makes the highest bid and plays out his announced contract.

blank

1. In card-point games, a card that is worth no points. A non-counter.
2. A hand with no court cards, i.e. only pip cards.
3. A card that is unguarded by other, usually lower cards in the same suit: "I held the blank king of spades."
4. To discard in such a way as to leave a card unprotected: "She blanked the king of spades."
5. To void a suit.

blank suit
A suit of which one holds no cards. A void (suit). To blank a suit is to get rid of all the cards of that suit from one's hand.

blaze
A hand consisting only of court cards.

blind

1. A dummy hand, for example, in Cego.
2. Cards dealt to the table as a skat or widow.

blocking
Blocking a suit is keeping a high card back so that the player with a number of smaller cards cannot win tricks with them.

bluff

1. To attempt to deceive one's opponent(s) about the value of cards in one's hand.
2. To use various tactics to mislead one's opponent(s) about the distribution of cards or one's strategy.

build
To add cards to those already on the table in order to extend a set or sequence.

bonus
An extra amount added to a player's score for the game for holding or winning certain cards or for achieving certain goals, such as Schneider.

bower
The jack of the trump suit or the Jack of the same colour as the trump suit e.g. in Euchre or Reunion.

left bower: the jack of the same colour as the trump suit.
right bower: the jack of the trump suit.

bring in a suit
Make tricks in a plain suit after the adverse trumps are exhausted.

bury a card
To place a card in the middle of the pack or discard pile so that it cannot be easily located.

buy

1. To receive a card from the dealer, face down, in return for a stake e.g. in Twenty-One.
2. To receive or draw the spare hand, (skat or widow) in return for one's own hand and, possibly, a stake e.g. in Newmarket.
3. To receive or pick up a card or cards in return for a hand card or cards e.g. in Préférence when the 2 talon cards are picked up and 2 discarded.
4. To draw cards from the stock or talon.

== C ==
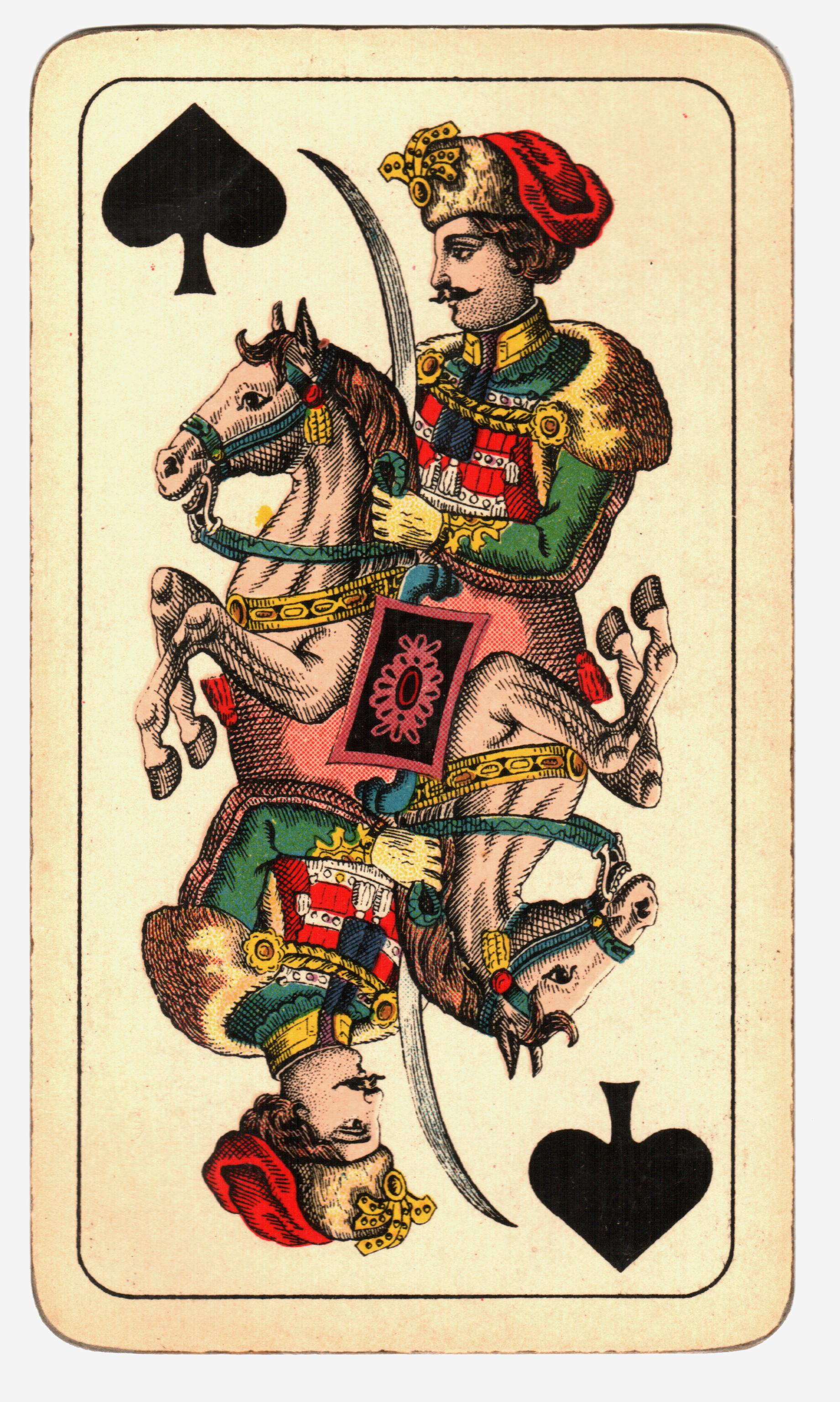
Cavalier from a Tarock pack

call
To declare, bid or pass. Any such declaration

capture
To pick up or take cards during play, often as part of a trick.

captain
the player who directs the play of his team or who has the final decision in certain partnership games.

card money
The charge levied by an establishment on the playing of card games.

card points
The scoring value of a card or cards in point-trick games. Card points are used to determine the winner of a hand, based on the value of individual cards won. Not to be confused with game points. Sometimes called pips.

card value
Ambiguous, may refer to card points or face value. It usually does not refer to rank. May be used to differentiate against "face value." For example, the Ace has a face value of 1 for its single pip, but in Blackjack, the Ace may have a flexible card value of 1 or 11.

carte blanche
A hand with no court cards (see blank), for example, in Piquet, Comet or Bezique; or with either no court cards or no pip cards in Briscan

case card
The last remaining card of a denomination left in play.

cavalier
The court card in certain card packs that usually ranks below the queen and above the jack.

chicane
A hand with no trumps.

chip
A token used in place of money; a counter; to put chips in the pot Also jeton.

chosen suit
A suit characterised by a disturbed ranking and in which some cards have privileges over cards of the unchosen suits or special powers when led. Chosen suits are found in most games of the Karnöffel group. Sometimes called a selected suit. Often misnamed a trump suit.

circle
A local group of card players who meet regularly to play a particular game. (Note: The term is frequently used, for example, by David Parlett in this sense e.g. "...details of play vary from circle to circle...", "Some circles play with winking...", "Many circles proscribe jokers in initial melds..", "One of the most popular of the 'fancy' games in domestic circles...", "Bridge-playing circles", "Poker circles".)

claim

1. An action or statement by which a player indicates he believes he will take all the remaining tricks.
2. To make such an action e.g. by laying one's hand down or saying "the rest are mine" in expectation that the opponents will concede.

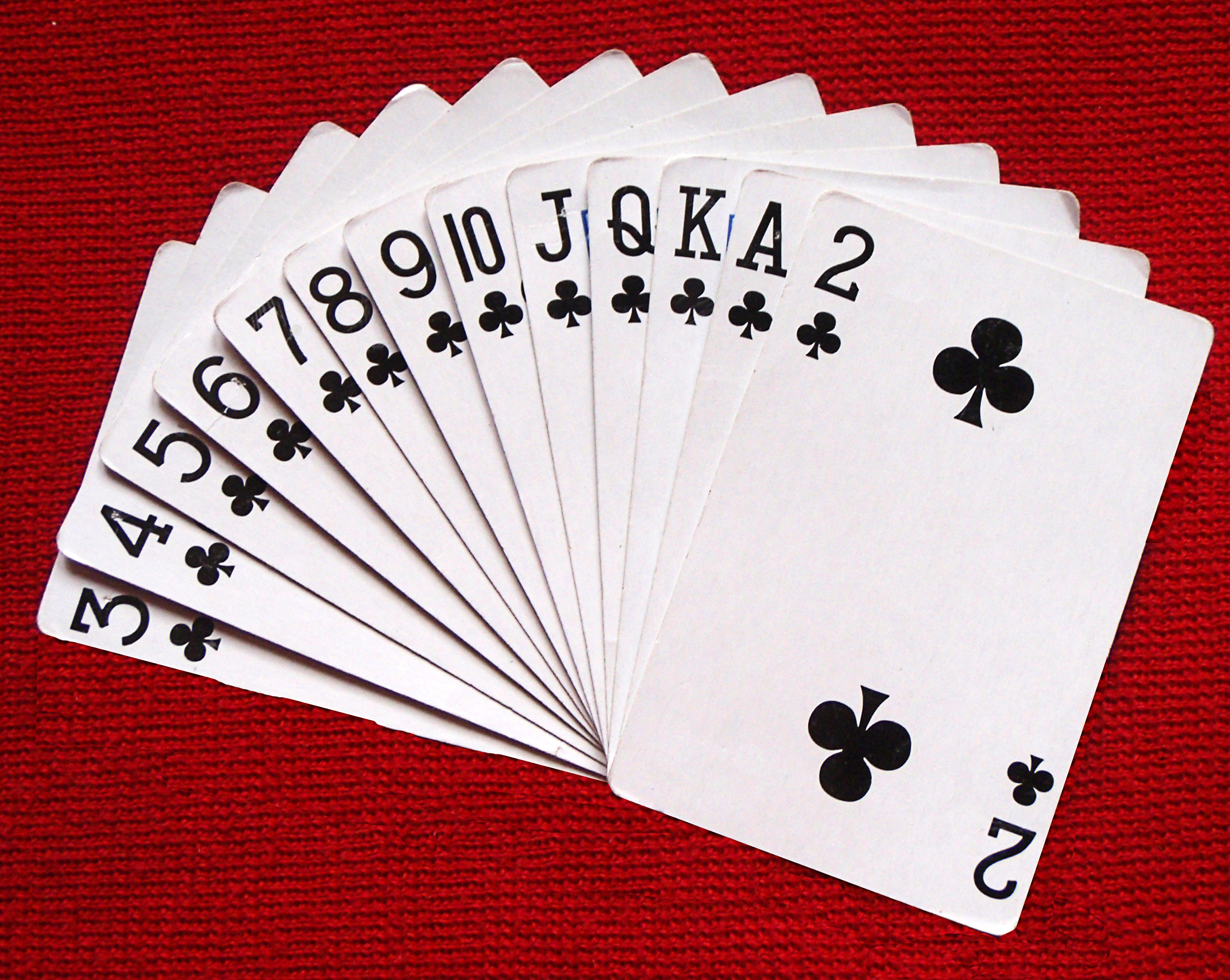
Suit of clubs

clear

1. Establish a card or suit by forcing out adverse higher cards or stoppers.
2. Having taken no penalty cards e.g. in Hearts.

close
To bar further use of the talon by turning the trump card over and placing it on the top in card games such as Sixty-Six and Schnapsen.

clubs
One of the four suits in a French-suited or Spanish-suited pack of cards. Symbol: or

coat card
Original term for court card, now obsolete.

coffee housing
To talk and act in order to mislead one's opponents about one's cards.

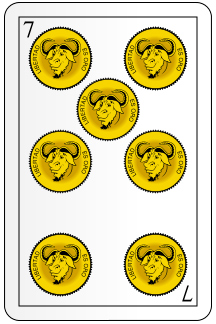
7 of Coins

Coins
One of the four suits in a Latin-suited pack of cards. Symbol: or

color, colour
In French-suited packs, this is the colour of the suit symbols, which is red for hearts and diamonds and black for clubs and spades.

combination
Two or more cards that score a bonus when melded. Often called a meld.

command
The best card of a suit, usually applied to suits which the adversary is trying to establish. See best card, king card and master card.

commanding card

1. The best card of a suit in play. Also best card, king card or master card.
2. The top trump or highest matador such as the knave of clubs in knave noddy or the right bower in euchre.

compendium game
A game in which a number of different contracts is played in succession e.g. Barbu, Quodlibet and Poch.

contract
An agreement or obligation to play a certain type of game, to win a certain number of points or tricks in a hand, round or game.

contractor
The highest bidder who then plays out his contract.

contrat
A short rectangular counter or chip used in some French card games and Danish Tarok that is worth a number of jetons or fiches, typically 100 jetons.

counter

1. Object used to score. Token used in place of money; a chip. Also jeton.
2. Card with a point value. Also counting card.

counting card

1. A card that has an intrinsic scoring value when taken in a trick. Also counter.

count out

1. During play, to claim to have enough points for game, thus ending the play; to go out during the play.

court card
One of the picture cards i.e. a king, queen or jack in a French pack; a king, Ober or Unter in a German pack, or a king, queen, cavalier and valet in a Tarot pack. Also face card, picture card or royal card. Originally coat card.

cover

1. To play a higher card of the same suit than any previously played to the trick. See also overtake.
2. To play a higher card than the highest so far played to the trick. See also go over, head the trick and play over.

cross-ruff
Two partners alternately trumping a different suit.

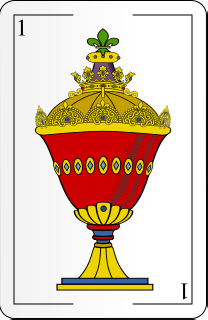
Ace of Cups

cross-suit
Suit of the opposite colour.

Cups
One of the four suits in a Latin-suited pack of cards. Symbol: or

cut
To divide the deck into two parts; usually after shuffling. Cards may also be cut to determine who deals or which suit is trumps.

== D ==
dead card
One that cannot be used in the play.

deadwood
Unmatched cards remaining in the hand e.g. in Rummy.

deal

1. Verb: To distribute cards to players in accordance with the rules of the card game being played. In many games, this involves picking up all the cards, shuffling them, having them cut and redistributing them, but in other games (such as Patience games) it simply involves turning over the wastepile to act as a new stock.
2. Noun: The play from the time the cards are dealt until they are redealt. Also referred to as a hand

dealer
The person whose turn and responsibility it is to deal the cards.

deck
May refer either to the pack or the stock / talon.

declaration

1. Announcement of melds or scoring combinations, as in Piquet. Dummett prefers to restrict 'declaration' to this sense, while preferring 'announcement' for the intention to achieve certain feats in play i.e. the 2nd meaning below.
2. The game at which a deal is played. A call or bid.

declare

1. To bid or to announce the trump.
2. To announce; predict schneider or schwarz.
3. To meld or show.
4. To count out.

Note: Dummett prefers to restrict 'announce' for the intention to achieve certain feats in play, while using 'declare' for a statement that one has a special combination of cards in one's hand.

declarer
In a contract game, the highest bidder who then tries to achieve the announced contract.

declaring side, declaring team
The side that wins the auction. The player who made the highest bid and his or her partner who join forces to achieve the announced contract.

defenders
The opponents of the declarer(s) in card games like Bridge or Skat. Originally those 'defending' the pool (see Pigott's Hoyle (1800).).

denomination
The rank of a card e.g. 2, 3, 4, etc.

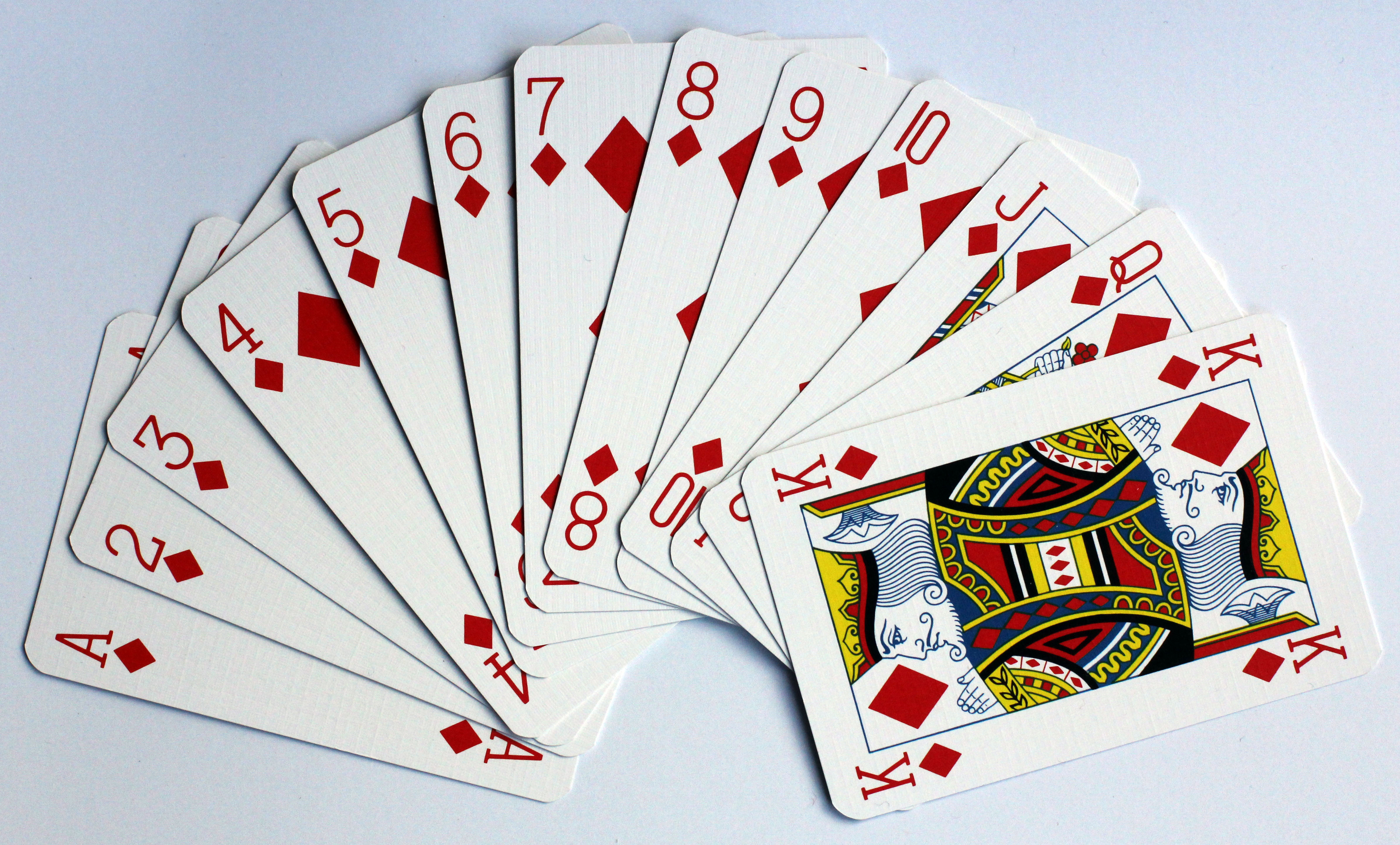
Suit of diamonds

deuce
The two of any suit. In German-suited packs, the deuce is nowadays usually called the ace despite having 2 suit symbols. In Austria and Bavaria usually called the Sow (Sau).

diamonds
One of the four suits in a French pack of cards. Symbol:

discard

1. To get rid of plain suit cards when unable to follow suit and unwilling or unable to trump.
2. To lay away cards, e.g. of high value or to void a suit, after picking up from the talon or skat.
3. A card that is removed from the hand in either of those ways.

discard pile
The pile of cards already rejected by players. The common pile of discarded cards. Also wastepile.

double, redouble
To increase the game value by a factor of 2. Redoubling effectively quadruples the original game value.

double-ended, double-figured, double-headed
Of a playing card, being designed to be read either way up by having indices at each end and, in the case of court cards, dividing the picture horizontally or diagonally and displaying only the upper part of the figure at each end. Also reversible. See single-ended.

doubleton
Only two cards of the same suit in the hand.

downcard
A card lying face down.

draw
To take a card from the stock (talon). Also 'buy' e.g. in Rummy.

draw lots
To select e.g. the first dealer by letting players choose a card at random from the fanned pack or by cutting the pack

draw pile
The stock or talon when it is specifically used for drawing cards during play.

dress

1. To set up the layout required before play e.g. to set up the 4 cards in Newmarket and place stakes on them
2. To ante counters or stakes to a pot or pool at the start of a hand.

drop, drop out

1. To withdraw from the current deal, for example in Mauscheln, Préférence, Three-card Loo and Toepen. Also fold.
2. To discard one's hand rather than stake enough chips to stay in the game, for example in vying games like Brag and Blackjack. Also fold.

dummy, dummy hand
A hand dealt to an imaginary extra player, and often played out according to certain rules.

durch, durchmarsch
See march.

== E ==
elder

1. Sitting at the left when the rotation is clockwise.
2. Non-dealer in two-hand play.

eldest

1. Of several players, the one nearest the dealer's left when the rotation is clockwise. May not necessarily be eldest hand.
2. Short for eldest hand.

eldest hand
This is the player to the left of the dealer in games that are played clockwise; or to the right of the dealer in those played anti-clockwise and who is usually first to bid or declare and play. The first player to play in the round. Called forehand in many games.

empty card
In Tarock games, a card without a special point value, usually a pip card, but sometimes also an ordinary trump (i.e. not one of the Trull cards.

endhand
See rearhand.

entrump
To make a particular suit trumps.

establish
To make cards the best by forcing out adverse higher cards; to clear.

established suit
A suit is established if when you or your partner can take every trick in it, regardless of who leads.

exit
To relinquish the lead; force another player to win the trick.

== F ==
face

1. The side of a card depicting its suit and face value
2. To turn a card so that its suit and face value are visible and its back underneath

face card
See court card.

facedown, face-down, or face down
With the denomination side of the card downwards and its back upwards.

faceup, face-up, or face up (US)
A card positioned so that it reveals its suit and face value. Also upcard.

face value
The marked value of a card. Also pip value. Court cards usually take the value of 10, and the Ace, a value of 1 for its single pip. Not to be confused with rank, point, and card value. For example, in Briscola, the 3-face valued card is ranked between the Ace and King, and is worth 10 points. Also, in Blackjack, the Ace may have a flexible card value of 1 or 11.

fall of the cards
The identity and order in which cards are played, especially as it gives an indication of the location of unplayed cards.

fan

1. To spread cards fanwise. To spread a hand or pack of cards, face up, in an arc so that they can be identified from their corner indices. Alternatively to spread them, face down, in order to enable players to 'draw lots' in order, for example, to choose teams or the first dealer.
2. An arc of cards so fanned. A spread of face-up cards.
3. In Patience, a small number of cards laid in an overlapping row, so that only one is exposed.

fatten
To discard counting cards to one's partner's tricks. Also smear.

fat trick
A trick that is rich in counting cards.

favourite, favourite suit
See preference suit.

fiche
A long rectangular counter used in some French card games and Danish Tarok that is worth a number of jetons, typically 10 or 20. See also contrat.

finesse
An attempt to take a trick with a card that is not the best of the suit.

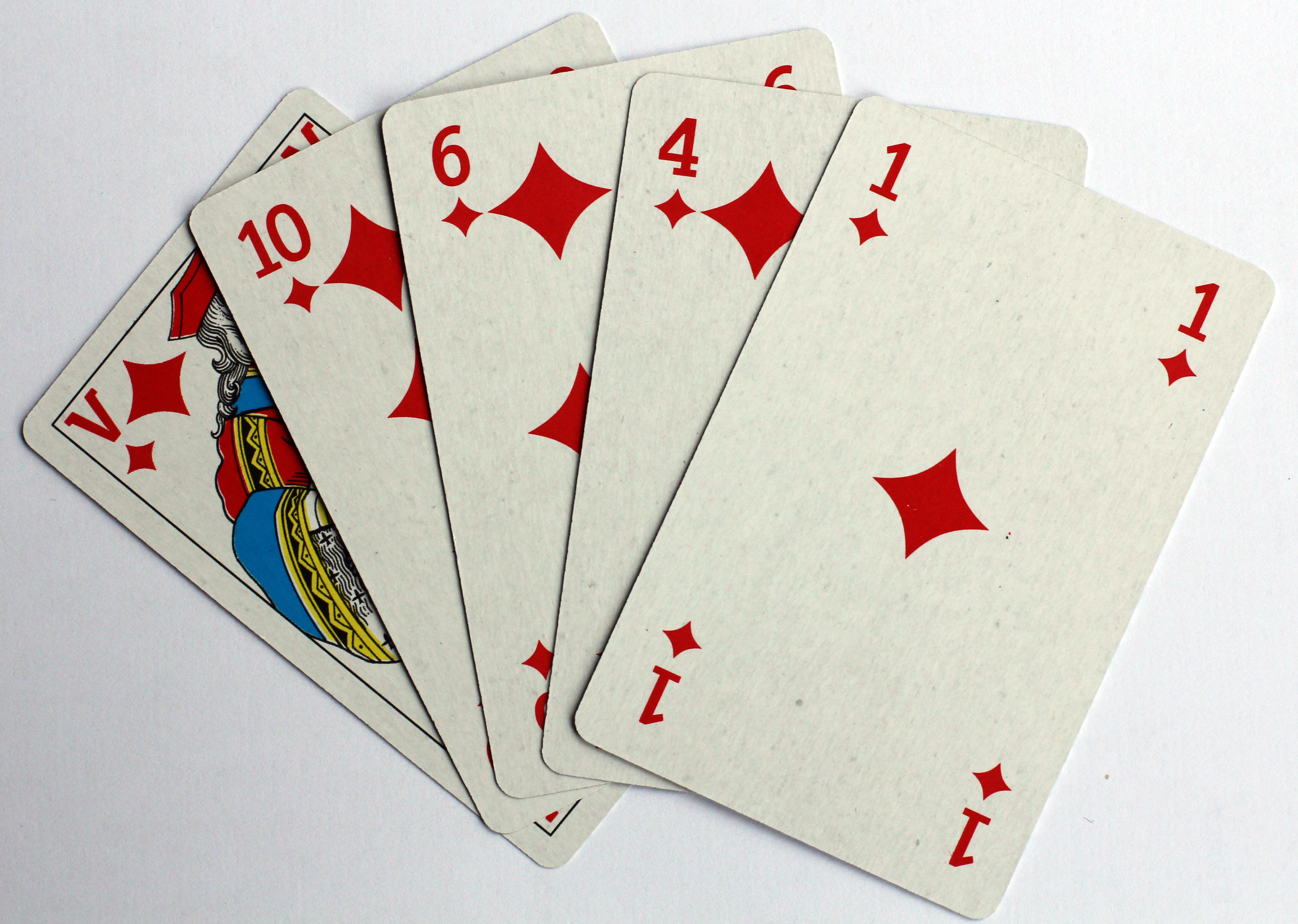
Flush of diamonds

first hand

1. The leader to a trick.
2. The first player to call.
3. Eldest hand.

flush
Cards of the same suit.

fold
To concede; to withdraw or surrender the current hand or game, for example in games like Toepen, Watten and games of the Poker family. Also drop or drop out.

follow suit
To play a card of the led suit.

force

1. To compel a player to trump a trick in order to win it. A player may 'force out' trumps by leading a long plain suit in which the opponent is void.
2. A compulsory round or deal in which all players must play and none may drop out. Also known in German games as a 'muss'. See Schafkopf.

forehand

1. Another term for eldest hand usually in card games originating from Europe. The player who is usually first to receive cards, bid and play. Sits to the left of the dealer in clockwise games and right of the dealer in anticlockwise games.
2. The player who has the right to lead to a trick or who is earlier in the order of play and therefore has positional priority. Also said to be in forehand.

French-suited pack
A pack of cards with the four suits: clubs, spades, hearts and diamonds. So-called because it originated in France, but now used worldwide. Compare with German and Latin-suited pack. The standard 52-card pack consists of French-suited cards which may be of various patterns (English/International, Belgian-Genoese, Dondorf, Swedish, etc.).

free card

1. A card with special privileges when led to a trick e.g. the Sevens in Bruus or the Eights and Nines in Knüffeln.
2. A card that cannot be beaten because all the trumps have been exhausted.
3. A card that cannot be beaten because all the trumps and higher cards have been played.

== G ==
game

1. A pastime in general, usually involving some form of competing.
2. A variant of a basic game e.g. Gin Rummy or Wendish Schafkopf.
3. A bid, declaration or contract.
4. A period in a session of play which results in a winner.
5. The target number of points as in "game is 100 points".
6. Fulfilment of the declared contract as in "their team made game".
7. A style or system of play.

game points
In point-trick games, the score awarded to the players based on the outcome of a hand, the game value of a contract and any bonuses earned. Game points are accumulated (or deducted) to decide the overall winner. Not to be confused with card points.

game value
The amount a contract is worth in points or hard score

German-suited pack
A pack of cards with the four suits: acorns, leaves, hearts and bells. So-called because it originated in Germany. Such packs are common in Austria, Germany, north Italy, Hungary and several other countries in eastern Europe. Compare with French and Latin-suited pack.

good
Concession by a player that he or she accepts the bid and does not wish to bid against it. May be announced with "good."

go out
To finish playing in the current deal because a) you have got rid of all your cards (e.g. in Rummy or Domino or b) you have achieved the tricks or points needed to win (e.g. in Fipsen or Sixty-Six).

go over

1. To bid higher; overcall.
2. To play a higher card than any so far played to the trick. Also head the trick or play over (but that can also mean to play a higher card of the same suit). Not to be confused with cover or overtake.

guard
One or more cards that protect a high card. A high card may be singly guarded, twice guarded, etc. (Note: For example, see Elwell (2020), p. 25.)

== H ==
hand

1. The cards held by one player ("playing hand")
2. The player holding the cards, as in "Third hand bid 1♠."
3. Synonymous with the noun usage of deal.

hand card
A card held in the hand as opposed to one on the table.

hand game or handplay.
A type of contract in certain games in which the skat or widow is not used.

hard score
A game played for 'hard score' – as opposed to those played for soft score – is one played for money. Coins may be used to stake; alternatively chips or counters with an agreed monetary value may be utilised.

head the trick
To play a better (i.e. higher) card than any already played to the trick. Also go over or play over (but that can also mean to play a higher card of the same suit). Not to be confused with cover or overtake.

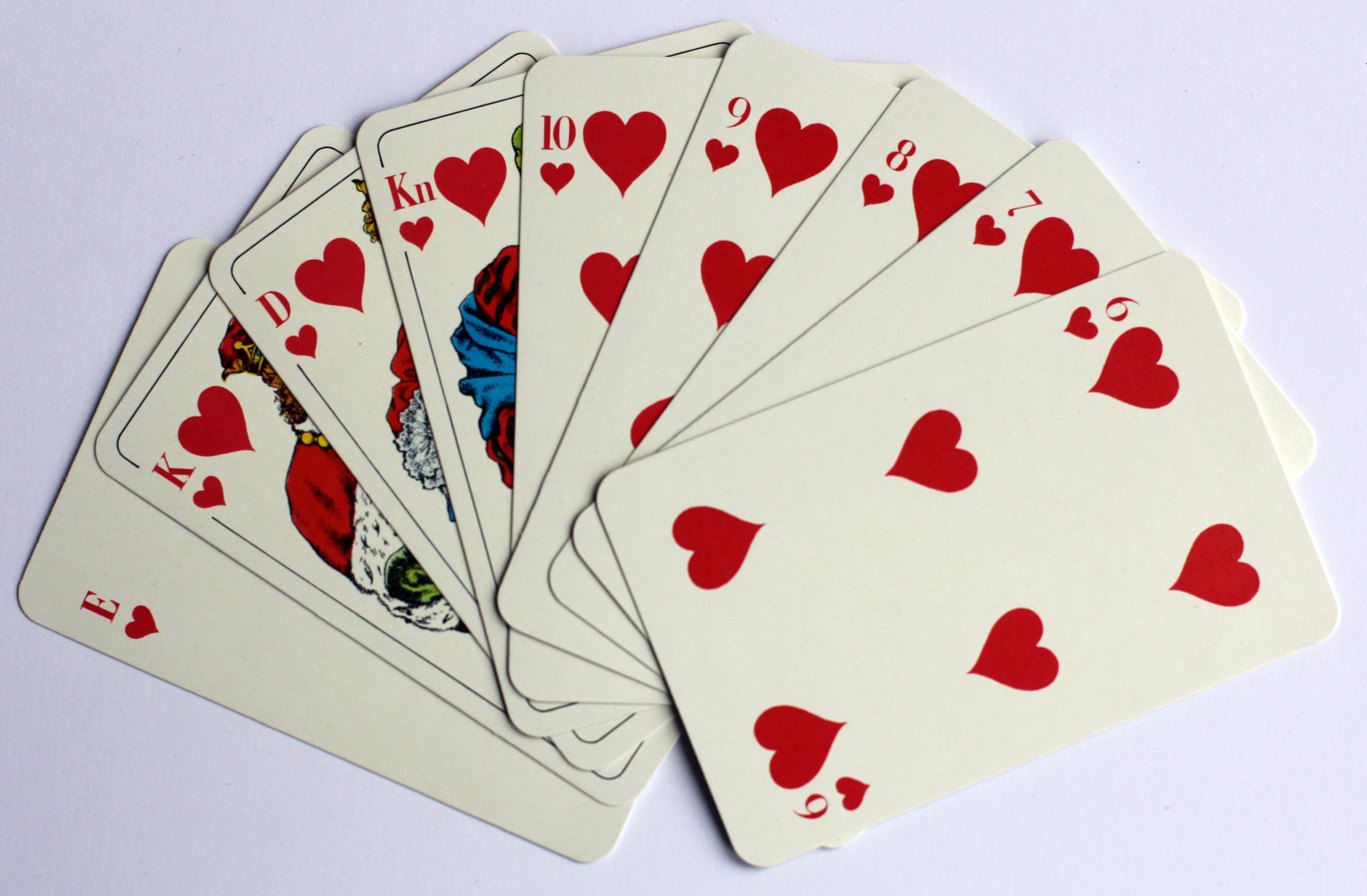
Suit of hearts (Swedish-pattern pack)

hearts
One of the four suits in a French pack or German pack of cards. Symbols: or

hold
As an earlier bidder in the auction, to match a higher bid, thus retaining the right to play a contract.

hold up
To refrain from playing (a high card). Also 'hold back'.

honour
A card attracting a bonus score or side payment, usually to the player or team for holding and declaring them, but sometimes for capturing them in play. From the French honneur. See matador.
In Bridge, the Ace, King, Queen, Jack or Ten in a suit.

house
See banker.

== I ==
index
The number or letter printed in the corner of a playing card, so that it may be read when held in a fan.

in turn
A player, or an action, is said to be in turn if that player is expected to act next under the rules. Jerry said "check" while he was in turn, so he's not allowed to raise.

invite
To lead a small card of the long suit.

== J ==
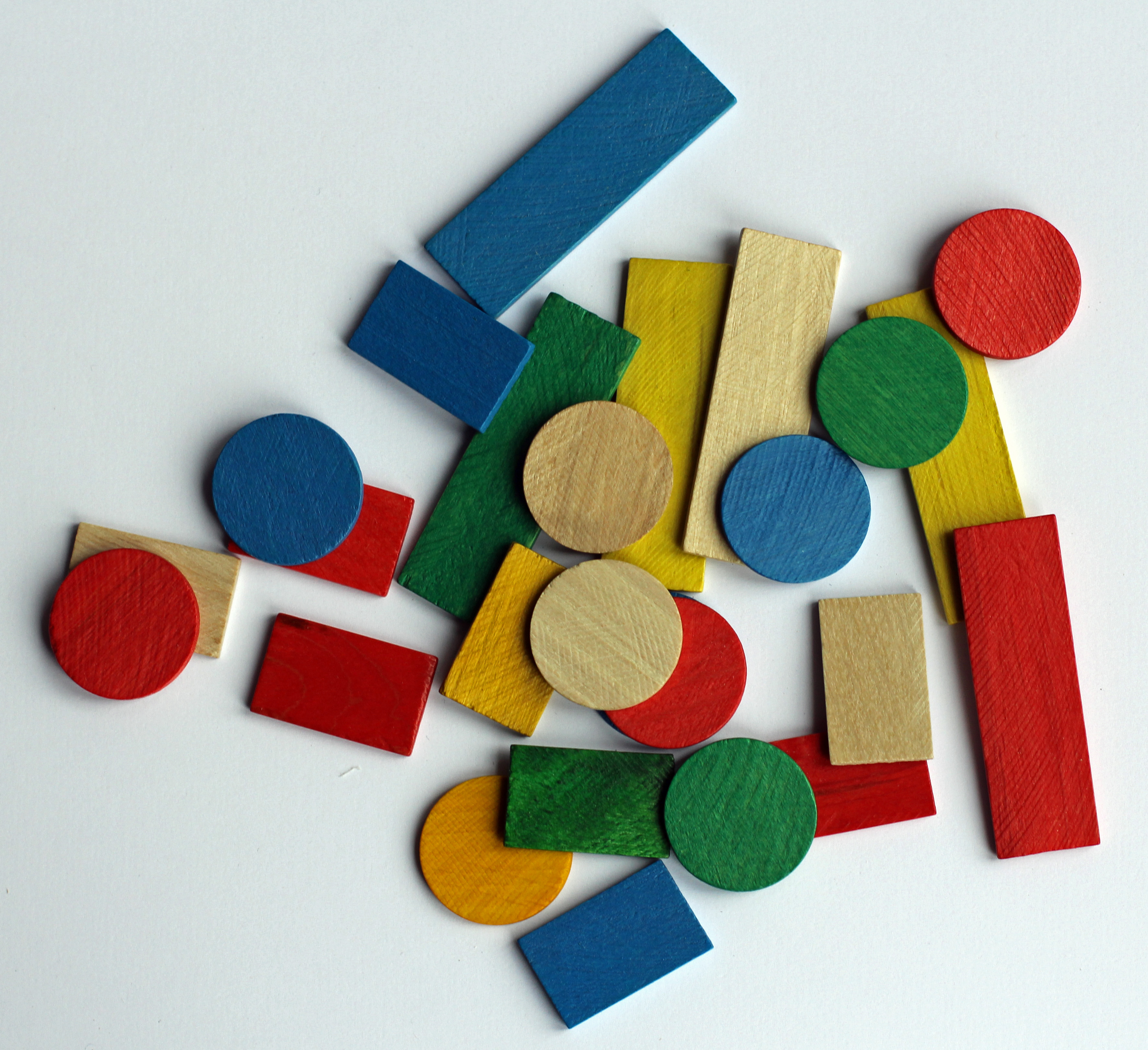
Wooden counters. Jetons are round, fiches are long and contrats are short and rectangular.

jan, jann
The equivalent of lurch or schneider in north German or Scandinavian games. It may mean losing without taking a trick, as in games of the Bruus family, or scoring less than 1/4 of the points, as in games of the Sjavs family.

Jack
The court card ranking, naturally, between the queen and the Ten. Also called the knave or valet in certain card games.

jeton
A circular counter which forms the basic unit of scoring or payment, especially in French card games. Often used along with fiches and contrats which are worth more. See also chip.

joker
A card, usually depicting a jester, used as the highest trump or as a wild card.

== K ==
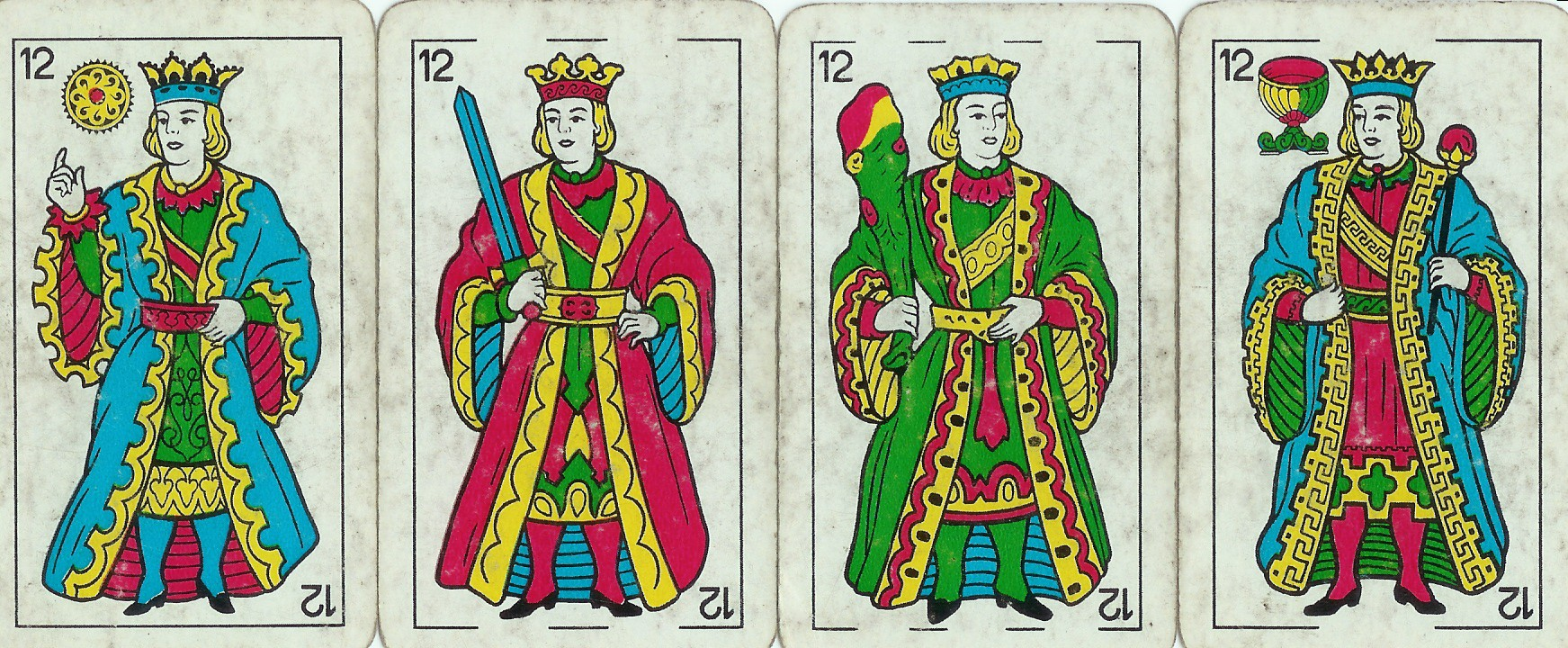
Four Kings (Spanish-suited pack)

kibitzer
Onlooker at a card game.

kind
See rank.

King
The highest court card, usually ranking between the ace and the queen.

king card
The best card remaining unplayed of the suit. Also best card, commanding card and master card.

kitty
Additional cards dealt face down in some card games.

knave
The jack in certain card games. Also valet.

knight
See cavalier.

knock
As the cutter, to tap the pack with a fist to indicate that you are satisfied with the shuffle and are happy not to cut the cards. Common informal practice in social or family circles in European countries.

== L ==
Latin-suited pack
A pack of cards with the four suits: Swords, Batons, Cups and Coins. So-called because it originated in Spain and Italy. Compare with French and German-suited pack.

lay away
To discard after picking up the skat or widow.

lay down
To meld a combination.

lay off
Especially in games of the Rummy family, to add a card to an existing meld

lead

1. To play the first card of the trick.
2. The card played first to the trick.
3. The privilege of leading e.g. "A has the lead" or "A is on lead".

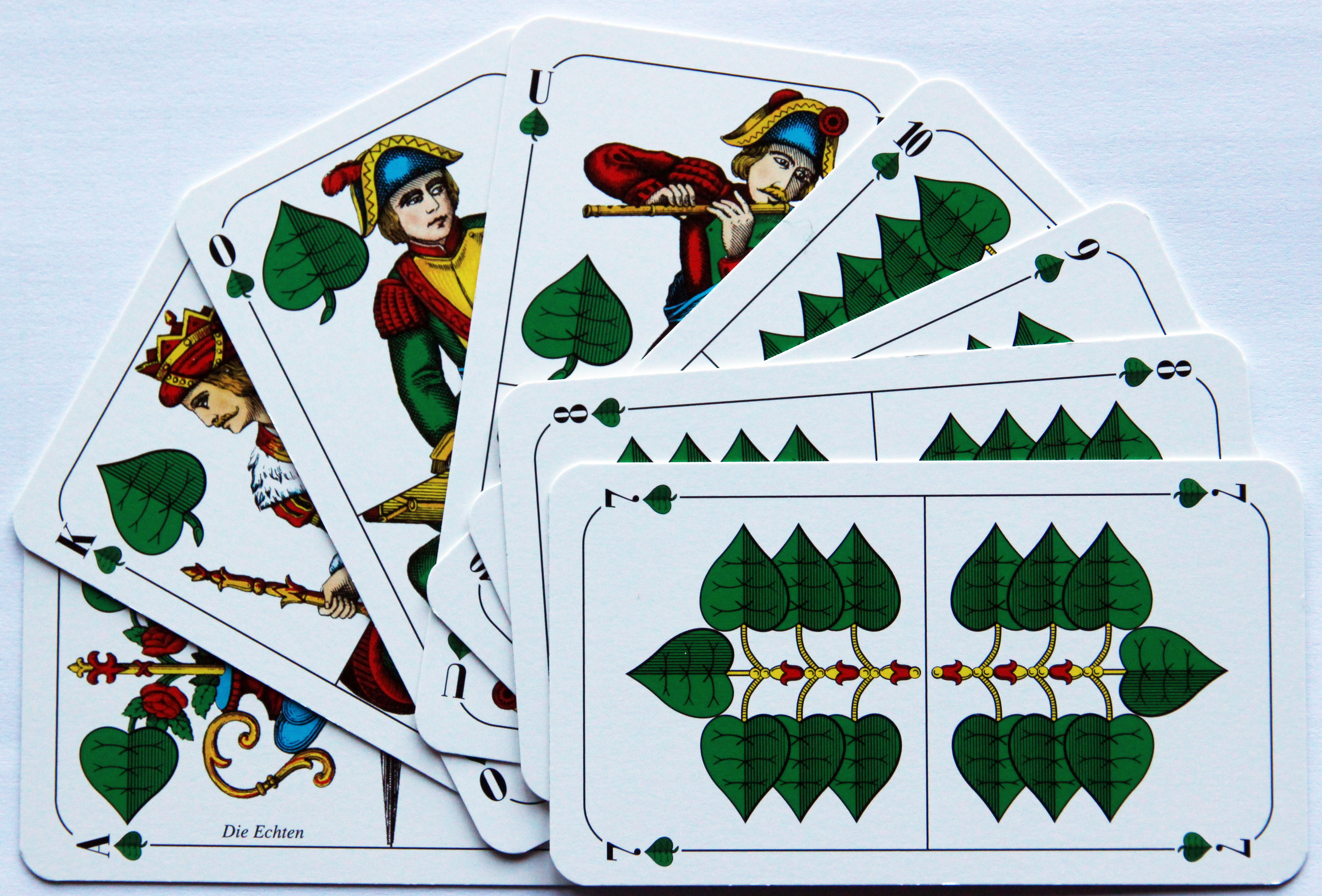
Suit of Leaves

Leaves
One of the four suits in a German pack of cards. Symbol:

led card
The first card played to a trick. Sometimes called the leading card.

led suit
The suit of the first card played to a trick. The suit of the lead card.

lone hand, lone player
A player who chooses to play without the help of his partner's hand.

long card
A card left in one's hand after all opponents are exhausted of that suit. Similarly, long cards are the dregs of a suit which has been led several times and exhausted in the hands of other players.

long suit

1. A suit containing more than four cards e.g. at Whist
2. The suit with the most cards in a player's hand.
3. The Swords or Batons suit in Latin-suited packs

loser

1. A player who has lost a game.
2. A losing card.

losing card
A card that is unlikely to win a trick.

low card

1. A card of low rank
2. A card of low value, especially in Tarot and Tarock games.

lurch
A player is 'lurched' or 'in the lurch' in card games like Cribbage, Saunt or Cassino if they not only lose but fail to score a minimum number of points, typically half of a winning score. Being in the lurch typically costs double. Similar to schneider.

== M ==
march
Euchre term, from the German Marsch or Durchmarsch. To win every trick in a deal. The score for doing so. The same as slam.

make

1. Fulfil a contract.
2. Name the trump suit or contract.

maker
The player who names the contract. Also declarer or contractor.

master, master card

The best (i.e. highest) card left in a suit which has been played. Also best card, commanding card or king card.
The highest card in play from a particular suit.

matador
A top trump, sometimes with special privileges. However, in some card games such as Skwitz, it is not a trump but a bonus-earning card. Any high trump.

match

1. A card game session comprising a number of rounds after which scores are finalised and a winner declared.
2. To play a card of the same value of the card or cards on the table, for example in fishing games.

matsch

1. A slam in certain Austrian or Bavarian games.
2. Failing to win at least a quarter of the points available in some German games. Equivalent to a schneider.

meld

1. Any scoring combination of cards announced, shown or played, e.g. three of a kind or a sequence of three or more cards. A declaration of such a combination.
2. To make a meld.

misère
A contract or undertaking to lose every trick. Also bettel, bettler or null.

misdeal

1. To make a mistake made in dealing cards e.g. dealing too few or many or facing a card during the deal
2. A mistake so made.

mord
A slam in certain Austrian or German games.

multipliers
Factors by which the base value of a declaration (and sometimes any bonuses) are multiplied to determine the value of a game.

== N ==
natural
Without the use of a wild.

natural card
A card that is not wild

natural order, natural ranking
The normal hierarchical sequence of cards within a suit. In a 52-card, French-suited pack the natural order is from Ace (high) to Two (low) i.e. A > K > Q > J > 10 … 2. In a 36-card German-suited pack, it is from Deuce ("Ace") to Seven i.e. D (A) > K > O > U > 10 … 7. Many games do not follow the natural order, for example, in ace–ten games the ranking is A > 10 > K > Q > J... or D (A) > 10 > K > O > U...

natural suit
The suit that a card would naturally belong to if not designated as e.g. a trump

negative game
A negative game or negative contract is one in which the aim is to either:
1. Avoid taking tricks
2. Lose every trick (as in Bettel or misère)
3. Avoid taking the highest number of points (for example in a Räuber in Cego or a Ramsch in Skat or Schafkopf).

next, next suit

1. The suit of the same colour as the trump suit e.g. in Euchre.
2. The suit paired with the trump suit e.g. in Schlauch. For this purpose acorns are usually paired with leaves and hearts with bells.

non-counter
A card which is not a counter i.e. has no scoring value.

null, null game

1. In games of the Skat family, a contract in which the declarer undertakes to lose every trick.
2. In Swedish Whist, a game in which both sides aim to take the fewest number of tricks.

numeral
A card for which the rank is a number (Ace usually counts as 1 in this case), as opposed to the court cards. Also pip. See also Pip (counting).

== O ==
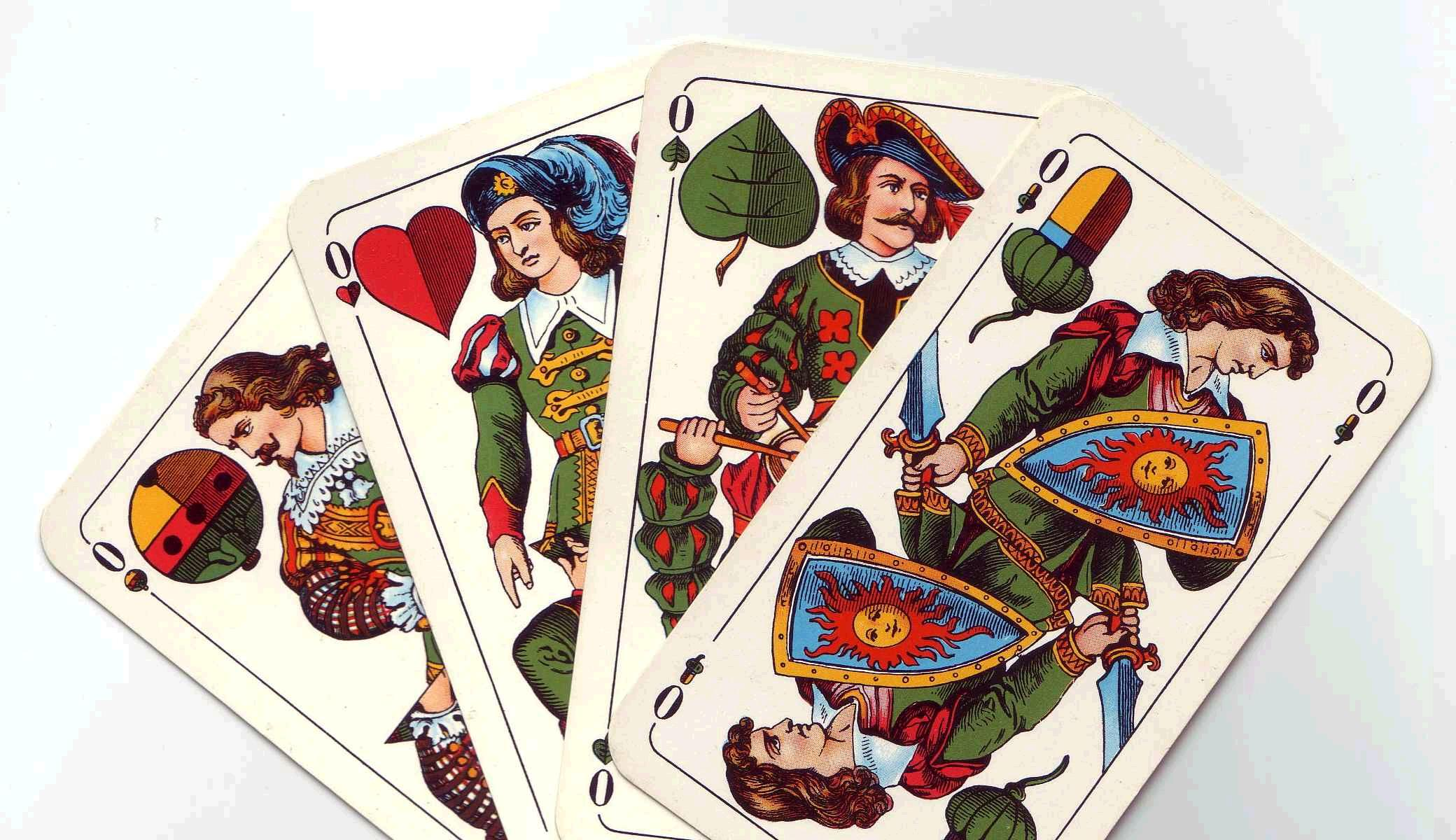
Four Obers

Ober
The court card usually ranking between the king and the Unter in a German-suited pack. The equivalent of the queen in a French-suited pack. Formerly also Obermann ("overlord").

open

1. To make the first bid, declaration or move.
2. To make the first bet.
3. To make the first lead of a suit. "It was correct to open diamonds..."

opening lead
The first lead of a deal.

order
See rank.

outbid
To bid higher than an earlier bidder. Same as overcall, but distinct from overbid.

ouvert(e)
A contract played with the player's hand of cards spread out face up on the table so it is visible to the other players

overbid

1. A bid of more than the value of the game.
2. Overcall.
3. An unduly optimistic bid.

overcall
To bid higher than an earlier bidder. May take the form of a suit overcall (bid a higher-value suit e.g. in Preference), majority overcall (bid to take a higher number of tricks e.g. in Fipsen) or value overcall (bid to win more card points e.g. in Binokel) The name of such a bid.

overs
Excess points in e.g. Cassino.

overshoot point
In point-trick games, a point in excess of the minimum needed to win the deal.

overtake

1. To play a higher card than any previously played to the trick. (Note: This is the sense in which McLeod uses it at pagat.com.) See also cover, go over, head the trick or play over.
2. In Bridge, to play a card higher than the winning card played by your partner, unnecessary to win the trick but necessary to gain the lead.

overtrick

1. To take more tricks than bid or contracted.
2. A trick exceeding the bid.

overruff, overtrump
To play a trump higher than any previously played to the trick.

== P ==
pack
A complete set of cards. In English-speaking countries, a standard pack comprises 52 French-suited cards. In other countries, packs of 24, 32, 36, 40 or 48 cards are common as are German or Latin-suited packs. Also deck.

packet
A portion of a pack, less than the whole pack.

pair royal
Three cards of the same denomination (rank). Also called a 'prial' or 'triplet'. See set.

partie
A game which requires a specified number of deals to decide it, especially at Piquet. See also rubber.

partner
Another player with whom one shares a common score, and with whom one therefore cooperates in bidding and play.

partnership
Two or more players who play jointly and win or lose together. May be 'fixed', in which case the players play together for the entire session, or 'floating', in which case partners vary from deal to deal, sometimes called an alliance. Also called a side or team.

pass

1. In bidding games, to make no bid. Usually called by saying "pass".
2. In vying games to pass the privilege of betting first.

penalty
A score awarded for common violations of the rules of the game. It can be awarded either negatively to the violating player/partnership, or positively to their opponent(s)

penalty card
A card that incurs a penalty, usually a minus score, e.g. the queen of spades and all hearts in Black Lady.

penny ante
A game played for insignificant stakes.

picture card
Usually the same as court card, but can include the Aces as well.

pile
A set of cards placed on a surface so that they partially or completely overlap. Also stack.

pip

1. A numeral.
2. A suit symbol (e.g. ♠, ♥, ♦, ♣ or,,,) on a card.
3. A card point in point-trick games. Not necessarily the same as the actual number of pips (symbols) on a pip card. Court cards also have a pip value.

pip card
See numeral.

pip value
The numerical, index or face value of a card.

pitch
In some games of the all fours family, to lead to the first trick, establishing the trump suit in doing so.

pitcher
A player who establishes trumps in leading to the first trick

plain card
A card other than a court card.

plain suit
Any suit that is not a trump suit.

play

1. To contribute a card to a trick.
2. To move a card to a place on the table (either from the players hand, or from elsewhere on the table), in Patience games.
3. The card played or the move made.
4. The stage of the game during which the players' hands are depleted by plays to tricks or to a common pile, etc. The "rules of play" are the rules for playing tricks, etc. e.g. stating that players must follow suit if able, otherwise may play any card (as at Whist).
5. Betting in general.

play over
To play a higher card.
To cover i.e. play a higher card of the same suit. Not to be confused with go over, head the trick or overtake.

point
May refer either to card points or to game points. Not to be confused with rank and face value. For example, in Briscola, the 3-face valued card is ranked between the Ace and King, and is worth 10 points.

pone
US term for non-dealer in some two-player card games e.g. Colonel or the player on the dealer's right, who cuts the cards. (Note: Play being assumed to be left to right)

pool
See pot.

positional priority
The priority a player has by virtue of his position in relation to the dealer and direction of play. Normally forehand or eldest hand has the highest priority, followed by the other players in the order of play. So, for example, in an auction if two players bid the same ranking contract and play is clockwise, the player nearest the dealer's left hand usually has priority.

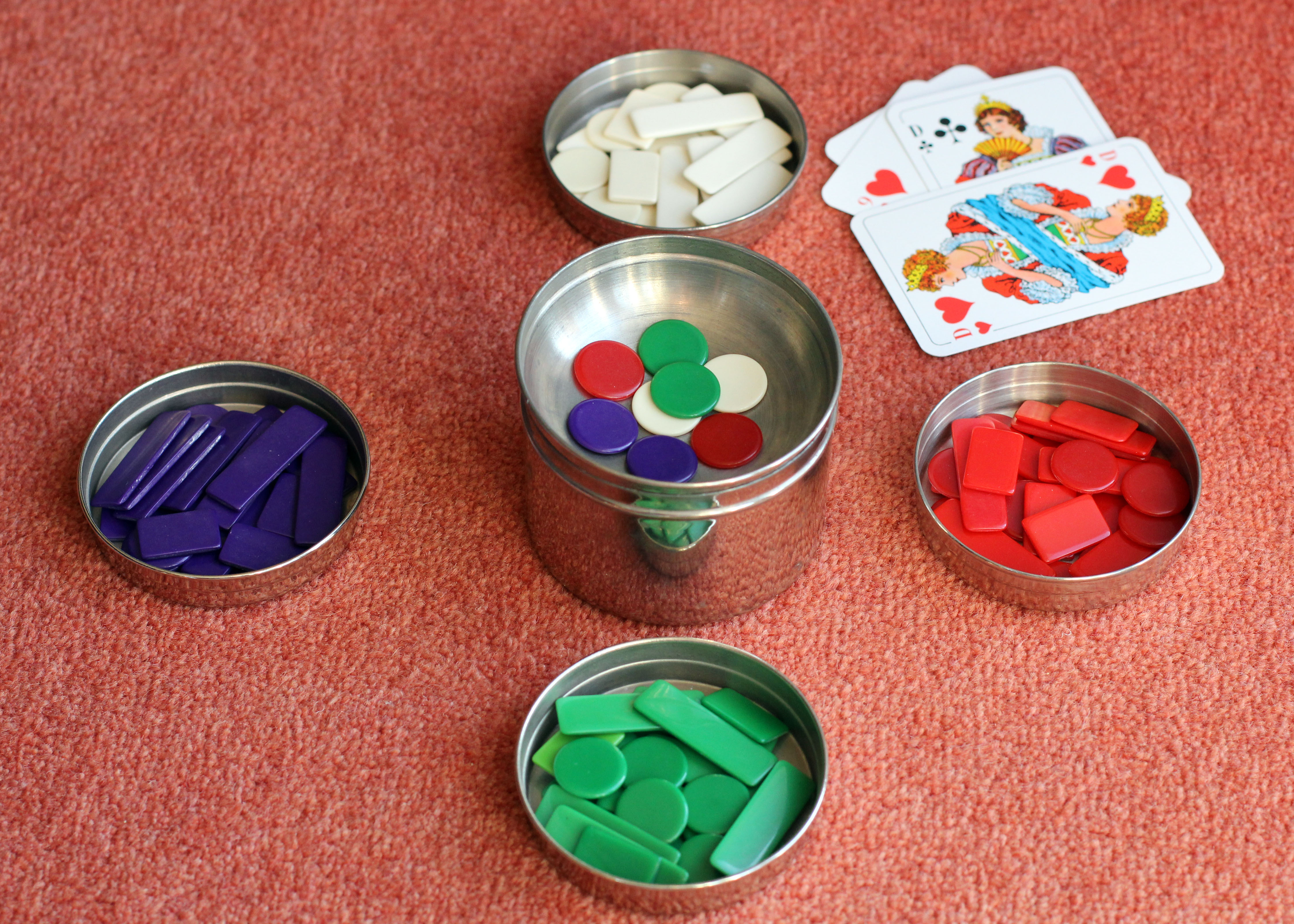
A virapulla - traditional Swedish tin for holding gaming counters. The pot for gaming chips is in the reversible lid.

pot

1. A container into which money or chips are paid initially and during a game and from which the winnings are paid out.
2. The contents of the pot. An accumulation of chips, antes, bets, forfeits, etc., to win which is the object of the game.

preference
A bid in the preferred suit.

preferred suit, preference suit
A suit that has bidding preference over the rest, as in Boston, Préférence or Fipsen.

prial
A 'pair royal'. A set of three cards of the same rank.

protection.
Cards that guard others, normally of higher rank.

punter
Person who lays bets in a banking game.

== Q ==
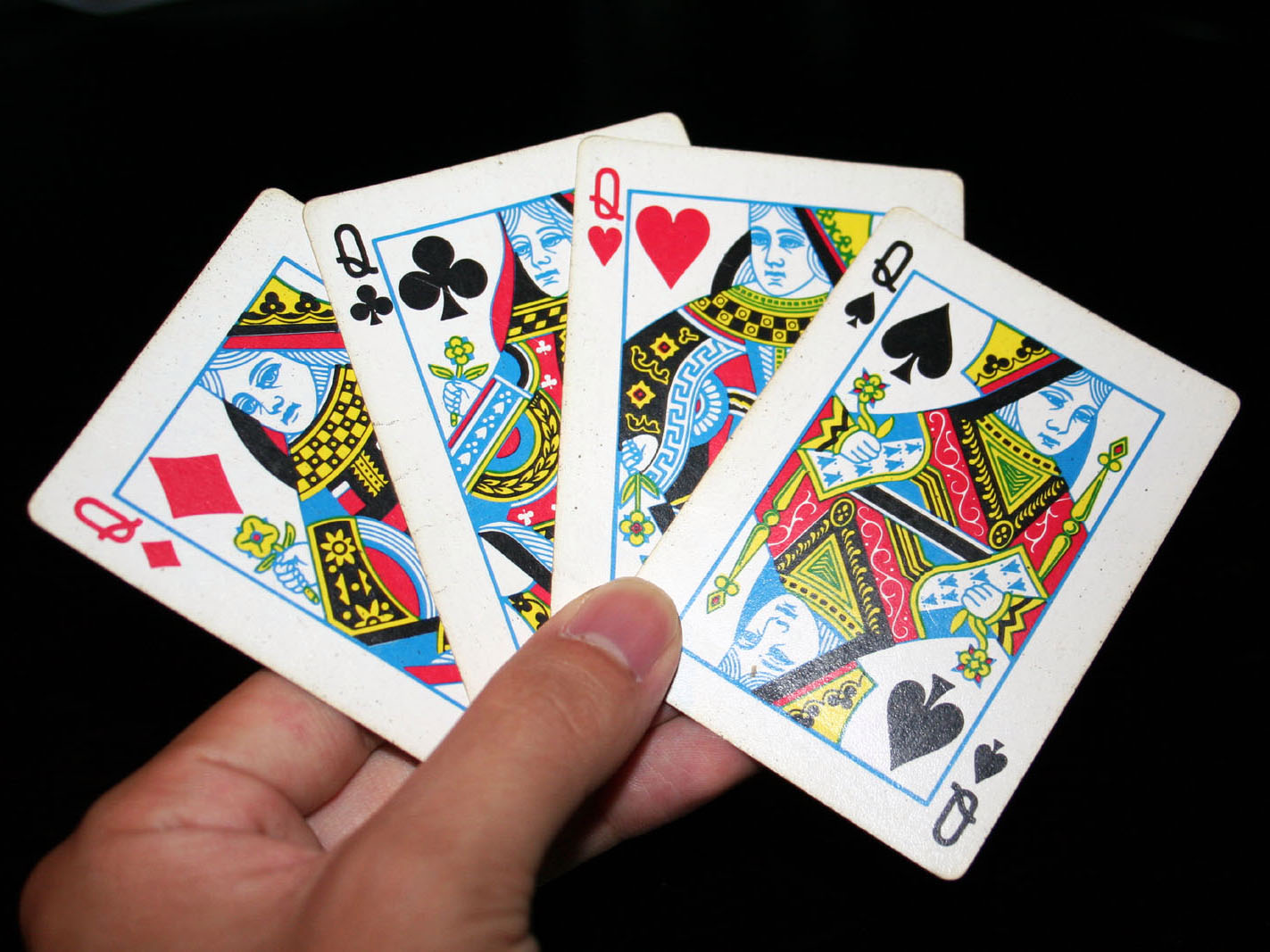
Four Queens

quart
A sequence of four cards of the same suit.

quart major
The Ace, King, Queen and Jack of one suit.

Queen
The court card ranking naturally between the king and the jack or knave. In Tarot and Tarock games, it ranks between the king and the cavalier.

quinte or quint
A sequence of five cards of the same suit.

quinte major or quint major
The Ace, King, Queen, Jack and Ten of one suit.

quinte minor or quint minor
The King, Queen, Jack, Ten and Nine of one suit.

quitted trick
A trick that has been taken and turned face down.

== R ==
raise

1. To name a higher contract than one has called previously because one has been overcalled
2. To increase one's stake
3. To increase the game value

rank
The position of a card relative to others in the same suit. The order of the ranks depends on the game being played. Not to be confused with point and face value. For example, in Briscola, the 3-face valued card is ranked between the Ace and King, and is worth 10 points.

rearhand

1. Usually refers to the player who sits to the right of the dealer in a four-handed, clockwise game. However, in a three-hand play, rearhand is the dealer; the last active player to receive cards. Also called endhand.
2. The last player to the trick. Also said to be "in rearhand".

redeal

1. A new deal by the same dealer after an irregularity.
  A new deal of some of the cards, e.g. the wastepile in Patience games.
2. The action of dealing again.

redouble
To double, again, a bid that has already been doubled once.

reduce
To shed one's hand of deadwood e.g. in Rummy.

regular pack
A pack of cards comprising suits each distinguished by a suit sign and divided into numeral and court cards, as opposed to a Tarot pack that has additional cards known variously as tarots, tarocks or tarocchi and which do not have suit signs, numerals and courts.

renege

1. To revoke. This is the most common usage.
2. To legally play a card of a suit other than the led suit.
3. To legally withhold a high trump when a lower trump is led.

renounce

1. To fail to follow suit legally because one is void; a void. This is the most common usage.
2. Of a suit, void. Having none of the suit led.
3. To play a card of a different suit from the led suit. May be legal or not, depending on the rules.

return
To lead back, usually the suit that partner led.

reverse game
A point-trick game in which the aim is to lose points rather than win them.

reversible
See double-ended.

revoke

1. To fail to follow suit when able to do so and the rules require it. Normally incurs a penalty.
2. To breach the rules of following suit, trumping, heading or going over.

rob

1. To exchange a hand card for the trump turn-up.
2. To discard several cards in exchange for the remaining trumps in the pack.

rotation
The direction of dealing, bidding and playing e.g. clockwise (to the left) is standard for American and English games. Anticlockwise (to the right) is common in traditional European games.

round

1. The events between the eldest player's action, and the youngest player's action of the same type (i.e. deal, bid, play), inclusive. A phase of play in which everyone has the same opportunity to perform such an action.
2. A series of hands in which each player has dealt only once.

round game

1. One in which there are no partnerships and everyone plays for himself or herself.
2. One playable by an indefinite number of players, typically 3 to 7.

round suit
The Cups or Coins suit in Latin-suited packs

royal card
See court card.

rubber
A match consisting of a number of games, typically three or five.

ruff

1. To trump a suit i.e. when a non-trump was led.
2. An instance of ruffing.
3. Historically, to rob the trump turnup.

run
A combination of three or more playing cards with consecutive rank values. Also called a sequence.

== S ==
sandbag
To withhold an action on a good hand in order to trap an opponent into greater loss.

sau or sow
The deuce or ace in German-suited packs

scat
See skat.

schmear
See smear.

schneider
When a player or team wins over 3/4 of the available card points in point-trick games, thus scoring a bonus. Typical of the Skat and Schafkopf families. The team scoring less than 1/4 of the points is said to be schneidered or 'in schneider'. The successful player or team is said to have won schneider. See also lurch.

schwarz
When a player or team wins every trick of the hand, thus scoring a bonus. The other side is said to be schwarzed. Common in games of the Skat and Schafkopf family.

seat
Position relative to the dealer: for example, in bridge, the dealer's left-hand opponent is said to be in second seat.

second hand
The second player in turn to call or play.

second turn
The turning over of the second card of the skat for trump, e.g. in Reunion or Skat.

see, seeing
To hold a higher bet in a vying game.

see saw
See cross-ruff.

selected suit
See chosen suit.

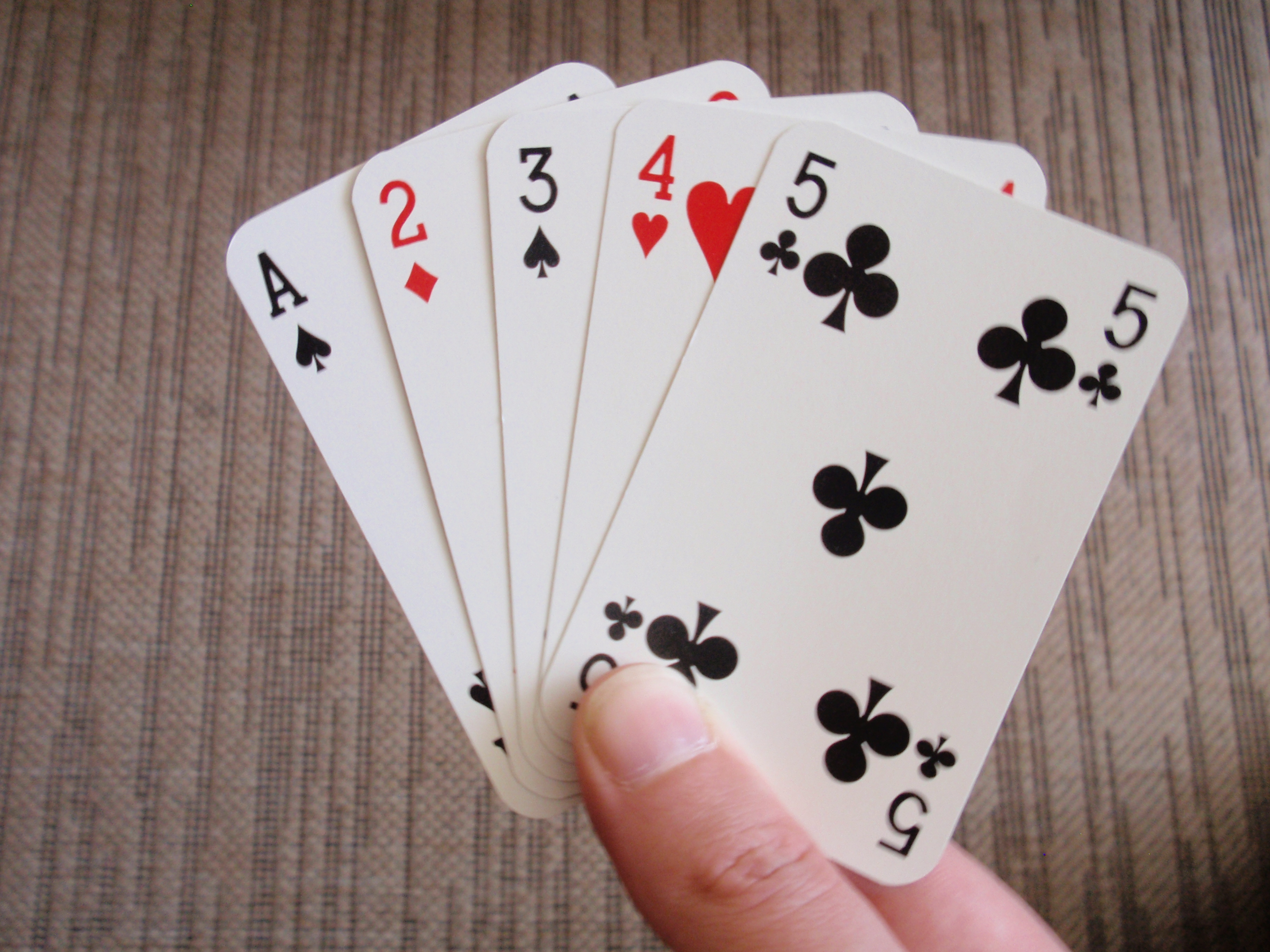
Sequence from Ace to Five

sequence
Three or more cards adjacent in rank. The adjectives ascending and descending may be applied (i.e. "building in ascending sequence" means "laying cards out so that each has the next highest rank to the previous one"). A sequence need not all be of the same suit. Also run.

set
Three or more cards of the same rank.

shed
To discard.

short deck
See short pack.

short game
Any game in which not all the cards of a pack are put into play, e.g. kurzer or short Schafkopf which is played with 24 cards.

short suit
A suit with less than four cards, two cards or fewer than the average cards for the suit.

short pack, shortened pack
A set of cards that has been reduced in size from a full pack (normally of 52 cards) by the removal of a certain card or cards.

shuffle
Rearrange (a deck of cards) by sliding the cards over each other quickly.(verb)
An act of shuffling a deck of cards. (noun)

shut out
Defeated without a single point.

side
See partnership.

side card
A card of a side suit; a non-trump.

side money
A bet in a side pot.

side payment
When players are primarily playing for the stakes in a pot, this is a separate payment directly from one player's pocket to another, for example to reward a bonus.

side pot
A pot that is separate from the main pot, either for specific bonuses or used when the main pot reaches a certain limit.

side strength
A player with side strength has high cards in side suits.

side suit
A suit that is not the trump suit; plain suit.

signal

1. Any convention of play whereby the team members properly give each other information as allowed by the rules.
2. Any permitted physical sign or gesture, such as winking or tapping the table when playing a card, that conveys information to one's partner(s).

single, singly
The basic, usually lowest, value of a game is described as 'single'. A game is won 'singly' if its value is not increased by bonus factors such as winning schneider which would double the score or winning schwarz which might quadruple it. (Note: See e.g. Parlett (2008).)

single-ended, single-figured, single-headed
Of a playing card, being designed so that it can only be properly read one way up. There are usually no indices and the courts depict full length figures. Today they have been largely replaced by double-ended or reversible cards.

singleton
Only one card of a suit.

skat or scat

1. Widow; extra cards dealt to the table which may be used for exchanging later. Also blind.
2. Note that, in German, 'skat' can also mean void i.e. lacking any cards of a given suit and therefore 'seeking the skat' means looking for an opponent's void suit.

slam
Winning every trick. Sometimes called a 'grand slam', with a 'little slam' being every trick bar one. Also called a march (e.g. Euchre), mord (e.g. Brandle and Grasobern), durch or durchmarsch, (e.g. Skat and Schafkopf), matsch, tout or vole.

sleeping
Said of cards that are not in play because e.g. they are in the unused part of the pack. See active.

sluff or slough
To discard. To play a card of little or no value.

smear or schmear
To play a high-scoring card to a trick if it is likely to be won by one's partner, especially in Schafkopf or Sheepshead. Also fatten.

sneak
Lead a singleton in order to be able to trump (ruff) the second round of the suit.

soft score
A game played for 'soft score' – as opposed to hard score is one played for anything other than money, usually points. The score may be chalked on a slate, recorded with pencil and paper. Equally, counters, tokens or chips or even matches may be used.

solo

1. A hand contract i.e. one played without the aid of the skat or widow.
2. A contract played alone against the combined efforts of all other players.

soloist
Player who plays a solo.

sous-forcer
See underforce.

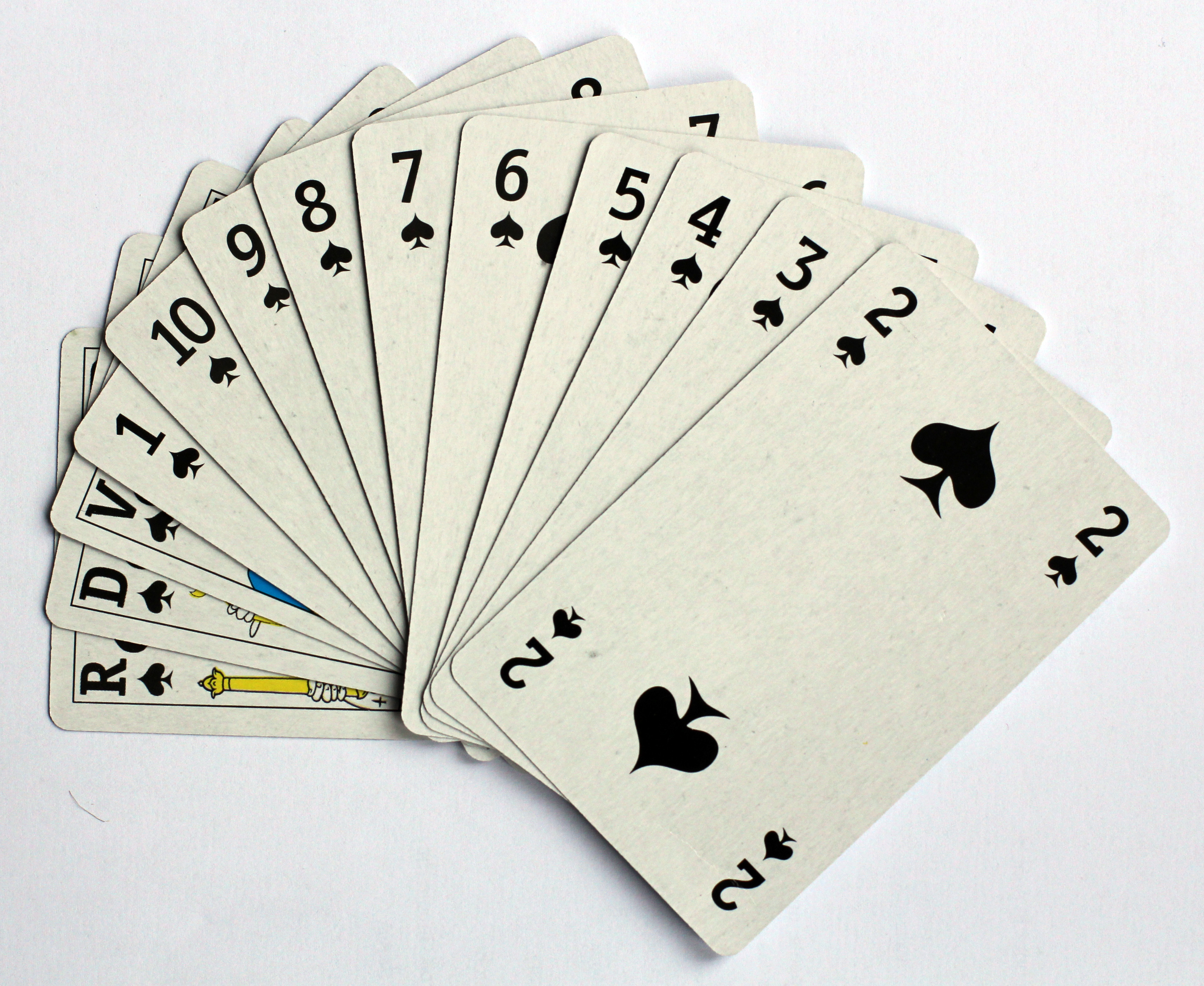
Suit of Spades (French-pattern pack, Écarté ranking)

Spades
One of the four suits in a French pack of cards. Symbol:

spot card
See numeral

squeeze
In trick-taking game, a player is 'squeezed' if he has to weaken himself in either of 2 suits, but has no way of deciding which.

stack
A pile of cards, less than the whole pack, placed on top of each other and usually face down.

stake

1. The money, counters or chips that a player places during a game.
2. The agreed monetary amount to be paid for each point, game or rubber.

staking board
A board with compartments, cards or marked areas on which stakes are laid during a game as in Newmarket or Poch.

staking layout
A marked-out area on the table or a set of face-up cards on which stakes are placed.

stand

1. Refuse to draw additional cards.
2. Accept the turn-up as trump.
3. Remain in the current deal or pot, as opposed to drop.

stay

1. Remain in the current deal or pot, as opposed to drop.
2. Refuse to draw additional cards. Also stick.

stick
Stand fast and refuse to draw additional cards.

stock
A pile of cards, face down, which are left over after setting up the rest of the game (i.e. dealing hands, setting up other layout areas) and will be used in the rest of the game. Also talon.

stop, stop card
A card which, when played, ends a sequence of cards on the table or a card that is undealt whose absence prevents the completion of a sequence. Gives its name to the Stops family of games.

Stops family, Stops group
A family or group of matching games in which cards must be played in ascending sequence and usually in suit. The aim is to be first to shed all one's cards. The cards out of play or which terminate the sequence are called stops. Examples include Comet, Pope Joan, Michigan, Newmarket and Yellow Dwarf.

straw man, strawman
A dummy hand.

subgame, sub-game
An individual contract or deal within a compendium game.

suit
Any of the sets of cards in a pack that share the same pip symbol. For examples see French-suited pack, German-suited pack and Latin-suited pack.

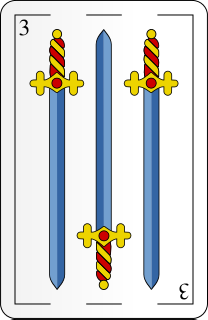
Trey of Swords

sweetener

1. An additional stake anted to the pot in Poker to encourage players to stay in the game.
2. A small bet in Poker not meant to cause an opponent to fold but to build up the pot.
3. An agreed amount that everyone pays into the pot following an auction in which all passed e.g. in Schafkopf. The pot goes to the next player to win a bid.

sweep

1. In fishing games to clear the table by capturing all the table cards upon it at that time. Usually earns a bonus.
2. The cards so captured.

swing

1. Lead the master card of a suit.
2. One of an unbroken sequence of cards from the top of the suit downwards.

Swords
One of the four suits in a Latin-suited pack of cards. Symbol: or

== T ==
tableau
Layout of face-up table cards in games like Yellow Dwarf, Zwicker and games of the Patience family. See Glossary of patience terms.

talon
The undealt portion of the pack which will be used in the rest of the game. Also stock.

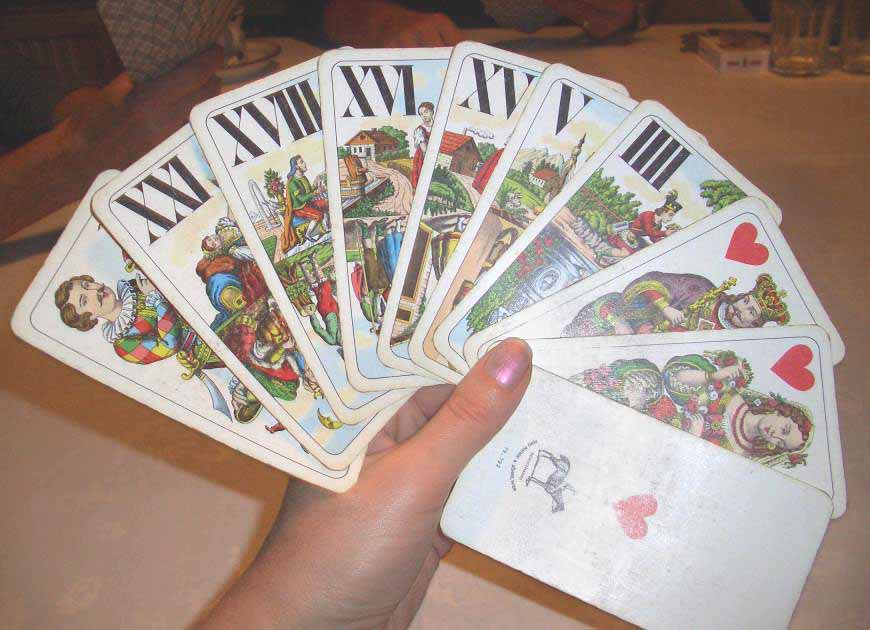
Hand of Tarock cards

tariff
The scale of values, either in units or money, on which payments are based for the various contracts in a game. For example, if the tariff is 10 cents; winning double would earn 20 cents and winning triple 30 cents. Games like Schafkopf have a double or triple tariff, e.g. a tariff of 10/50 means that the normal game earns 10 cents from each opponent and a soloist game earns 50 cents.

Tarocchi
Trump cards in tarot games of Italian origin. Also Tarock or Tarot in games from other countries.

Tarock
Trump cards in tarot games of Austrian or German origin. Also Tarot or Tarocchi in games from other countries. Also spelt Taroc or Tarok.

Tarot
Trump cards in tarot games of French origin. Also Tarock or Tarocchi in games from other countries.

team
See partnership.

tenace
A combination of high cards not in sequence. Major tenace: A-Q (or K-C in Tarock games); minor tenace: K-J (or Q-J in Tarock games); double tenace: A-Q-10 (or K-C-10/A in Tarock games).

throw in
To return cards to the dealer if, for example, no-one makes a bid or if the cards are misdealt.

throw off
To discard or smear.

throw up
To throw up one's cards is to discard them to the table either because you believe the game is decided or nullified, or you wish to drop out of the current hand.

touching
Said of cards that are adjacent in rank.

tout
Winning all the tricks in European games. Also durch, durchmarsch, march, matsch, slam or vole.

Trey
The Three of any suit. Also 'three-spot'.

Tribute
A forced payment after a loss.

trick
See Trick-taking game. A set of cards played by each player in turn, during the play of a hand.

triplet
Three of a kind.

tripleton
Three cards of a suit in the hand.

trump

1. A privileged card whose trick-taking power is greater than any plain suit card.
2. The trump suit.
3. A card in the special suit of trumps found in tarot packs such as the Tarot Nouveau.
4. To play a trump after a plain suit has been led. Also ruff.

trump suit
A privileged suit in which, in the current deal, all its cards rank higher than any plain (=non-trump) card.

turn the corner
Said of a sequence of cards when the top card (typically the Ace or King) is preceded by high cards on one side and low cards on the other e.g. 3-2-A-K-Q-J.

turn-up, turnup
A card turned up at the start of a game to determine the trump suit.

== U ==
ultimo
Winning the last trick with the lowest trump or, sometimes, with a King.

unchosen suit
In games of the Karnöffel Group, a suit, usually ranking in the natural order, most of all of whose cards have no special privileges, in contrast to the chosen suits. Sometimes called an unselected suit.

underforce or under-force
To answer a card with one of the same suit, but inferior value to those remaining in hand; e.g. putting the nine of clubs on the ten, having the ace in hand. Also under-force, under-play or sous-forcer.

underlead
To lead a low card when holding the top card or cards in a suit. (Note: For example, see Medley (2019), Learn to Play Bridge, "to underlead the ace means you have the ace in your hand, but you lead a lower-ranking card of the same suit.")

underplay or under-play

1. To lead or follow suit with a lower card when holding a higher one; hold up; refuse to cover.
2. See underforce.

undershoot point
In point-trick games, a point shy of the minimum needed to win the deal.

undertrick

1. To fall short of the declared number of tricks.
2. A trick short of the bid.

unguarded
Unprotected by another, usually lower, card of the same suit. See also blank.

unload
To get rid of dangerous cards from one's hand.

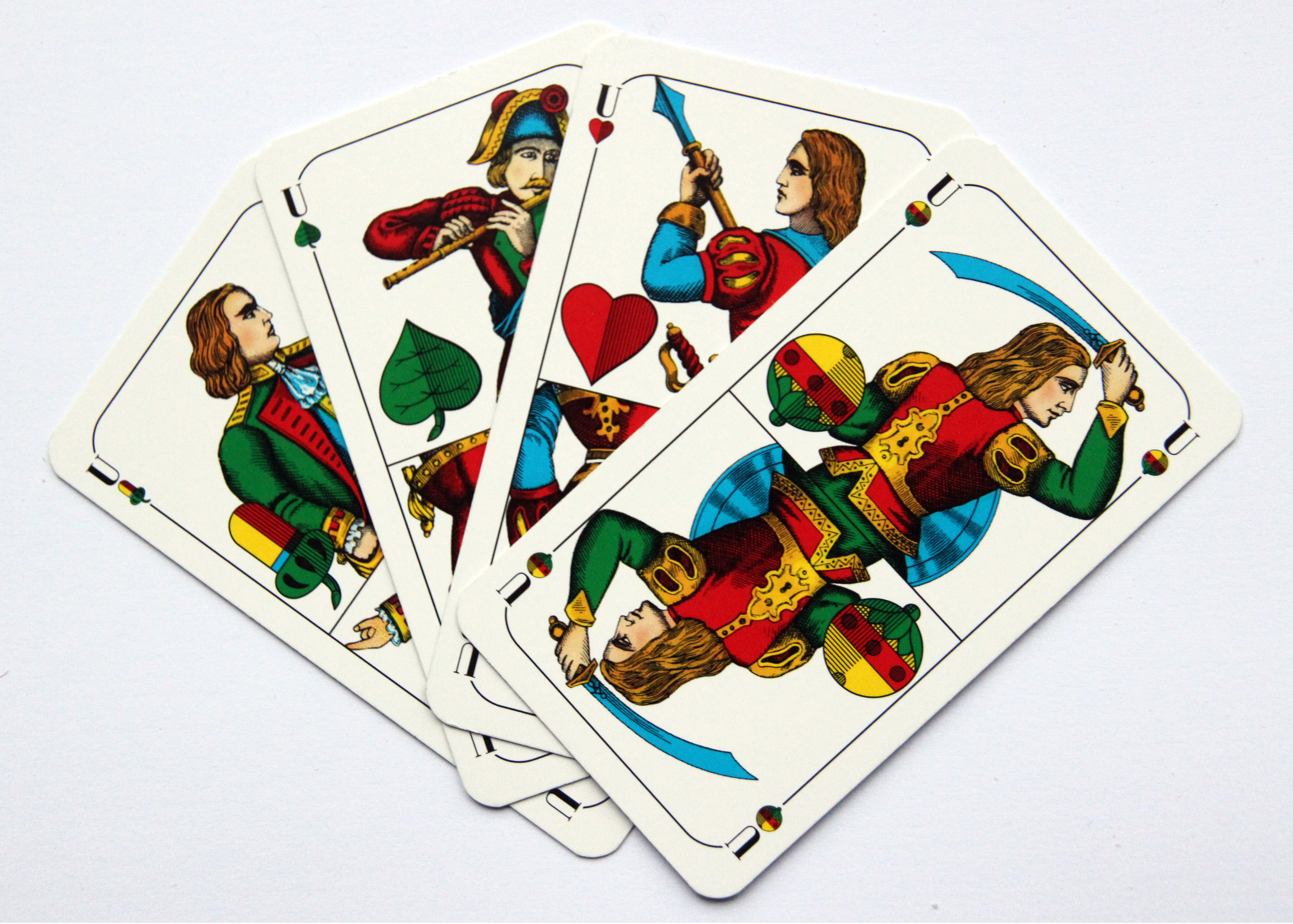
Four Unters

unselected suit
See unchosen suit.

Unter
The court card usually ranking between the Ober and the Ten in a German-suited pack. The equivalent of the jack in a French-suited pack. Formerly also Untermann ("underling").

upcard

1. A card laid on the table face-up.
2. The top card of a pile, turned face up.

== V ==
valet
The jack in certain card games. Also knave.

value
See card value

variant
A game version whose aim, mechanism of play, equipment or tactics are sufficiently different for it to be viewed as a separate, albeit related, game.

variation

1. A game version in which there are minor rule differences, but in which the aim, mechanism of play and tactics remain the same.
2. A minor rule difference.

vie, vying
To claim you have, or will have, the best hand and stake money on it. Vying includes an element of bluffing.

void
Having no card of a given suit. Also blank suit.
To discard all cards of a given suit.

vole
Winning all the tricks in some English and European games. Also durch, durchmarsch, march, matsch, slam or tout.

== W ==
wastepile or waste-pile
A pile of discards or cards that a player is unable to play. Also discard pile.

whitewashed
Losing without scoring a point. See also schwarz.

widow
American term for a blind or skat. Hand of cards dealt face down on the table at the start of play that may subsequently be used by players to exchange cards.

wild card
A card that may be designated by the owner to represent any other card. A joker is often used as a wild card, but can also have other uses.

== Y ==
youngest
The last player to play before the eldest player's second turn. Some family games will use eldest and youngest to refer to the players' actual ages.

== Game-specific glossaries ==
A few games or families of games have enough of their own specific terminology to warrant their own glossaries:

- Blackjack. See the glossary of blackjack terms.
- Bridge. See the glossary of contract bridge terms which covers contract bridge, duplicate bridge, and auction bridge; some of the terms are also used in whist, bid whist, and other trick-taking games.
- Patience or Solitaire. See the glossary of patience and solitaire terms.
- Poker. See the glossary of poker terms.
- Schafkopf. See Schafkopf language.
- Skat. See the glossary of Skat terms.

== Literature ==
- Ausführliche anleitung zum Deutschtarokspielen. Munich: Cäsar Fritsch. 1881.
- Arnold, Peter (1988) [1995]. The Book of Card Games. New York: Barnes and Noble. ISBN 1-56619-950-6.
- Arnold, Peter (2007). Chambers Card Games: 100 Great Games Illustrated and Explained. Edinburgh: Chambers. ISBN 978-0550103369 – via Open Library.
- Arnold, Peter (2011). Card Games for One. London: Chambers. ISBN 978-0550-10201-0.
- Cavendish (1876). The Laws and Principles of Whist. 5th edn. London: De La Rue.
- Crawley, Rawdon (1866). Beeton's Handy Book of Games. London: Beeton.
- Dawson, L. (2013) [1923]. Hoyles Card Games. London: Routledge.
- * Dummett, Michael (1980). The Game of Tarot. London: Duckworth.
- Dummett, Michael; McLeod, John (2003). A History of Games Played with the Tarot Pack: The Game of Triumphs. Vol. 1. Lewiston, NY / Lampeter, Wales / Queenston, Ontario: Edwin Mellen.
- Dyche, Thomas; Pardon, William (1740). A New General English Dictionary (Third ed.). London: Ware.
- Elwell, J.B. (2020). Advanced Bridge. Frankfurt: Outlook.
- Forbes-Lindsay, Charles Harcourt Ainslie; Bergholt, Ernest (1902). The Principles and Practice of Whist. H.T. Coates.
- Foster, Robert Frederick (1897). Foster's Complete Hoyle (Third ed.). New York / London: Frederick A. Stokes.
- Gibson, Walter B. (1974). Hoyle's Modern Encyclopedia of Card Games: Rules of All the Basic Games and Popular Variations. Garden City, NY: Dolphin Books. ISBN 978-0385076807.
- Golick, Margie (1998). Card Games for Smart Kids. New York: Sterling. ISBN 978-0-8069-4887-4.
- Goren, Charles (1950). Goren's Hoyle. New York: Greystone.
- Greer, Alec (1979). New Comprehensive Mathematics for 'O' Level. Cheltenham: Stanley Thomas.
- Heinsius, Theodor (1828). Vollständiges Wörterbuch, A–F, Volume 1. Vienna: Christian Friedrich Schade.
- Jackson, Robin (2001). Solitaire. Barnes & Noble.
- Kansil, Joli Quentin, ed. (2001). Official Rules of Card Games (90th ed.). Cincinnati: Bicycle. ISBN 978-1-889752-06-8.
- Mahmood, Zia and Audrey Grant (2014). Bridge for Beginners.
- Moss, William A. (1995). 10-Minute Card Games. New York: Sterling. ISBN 978-0-8069-3847-9.
- Pardon, George Frederick (1864). The Card Player. London: Routledge, Warne & Routledge.
- Parlett, David (1979). The Penguin Book of Patience. London: Penguin. ISBN 0-7139-1193-X.
- Parlett, David (2008). The Penguin Book of Card Games. London: Penguin. ISBN 978-0-141-03787-5.
- Phillips, Hubert, ed. (1957). Culbertson's Card Games Complete. Watford: Arco.
- Sfetcu, Nicolae (2014). Bridge Bidding (Multimedia).
- Silberstang, Edwin (1972). Playboy Book of Games.
- Hans Jörgel von Gumpoldskirchen: Volksschrift im Wiener Dialekte. Vol. 44. 24 Dec 1875.
- Walker, G. W., ed. (1838). The Philidorian. Sherwood, London.
- Weber, Ferdinand Adolf (1840). Kritisch- erklärendes Handwörterbuch der Deutschen Sprache (Third revised and expanded ed.). Leipzig: Bernhard Tauchnitz jun.
