= Hand game (disambiguation) =

Hand game may refer to:

- Hand game, games played using only the hands
- Hand game (cards), a type of contract in certain card games
- Handgame, an Indian gambling game.
