= Lay off =

Lay off may refer to:

- Layoff, the temporary suspension of workers from work
- Lay off (cards), to add cards to an existing meld in games like rummy
