= Newmarket (card game) =

Gambling card game

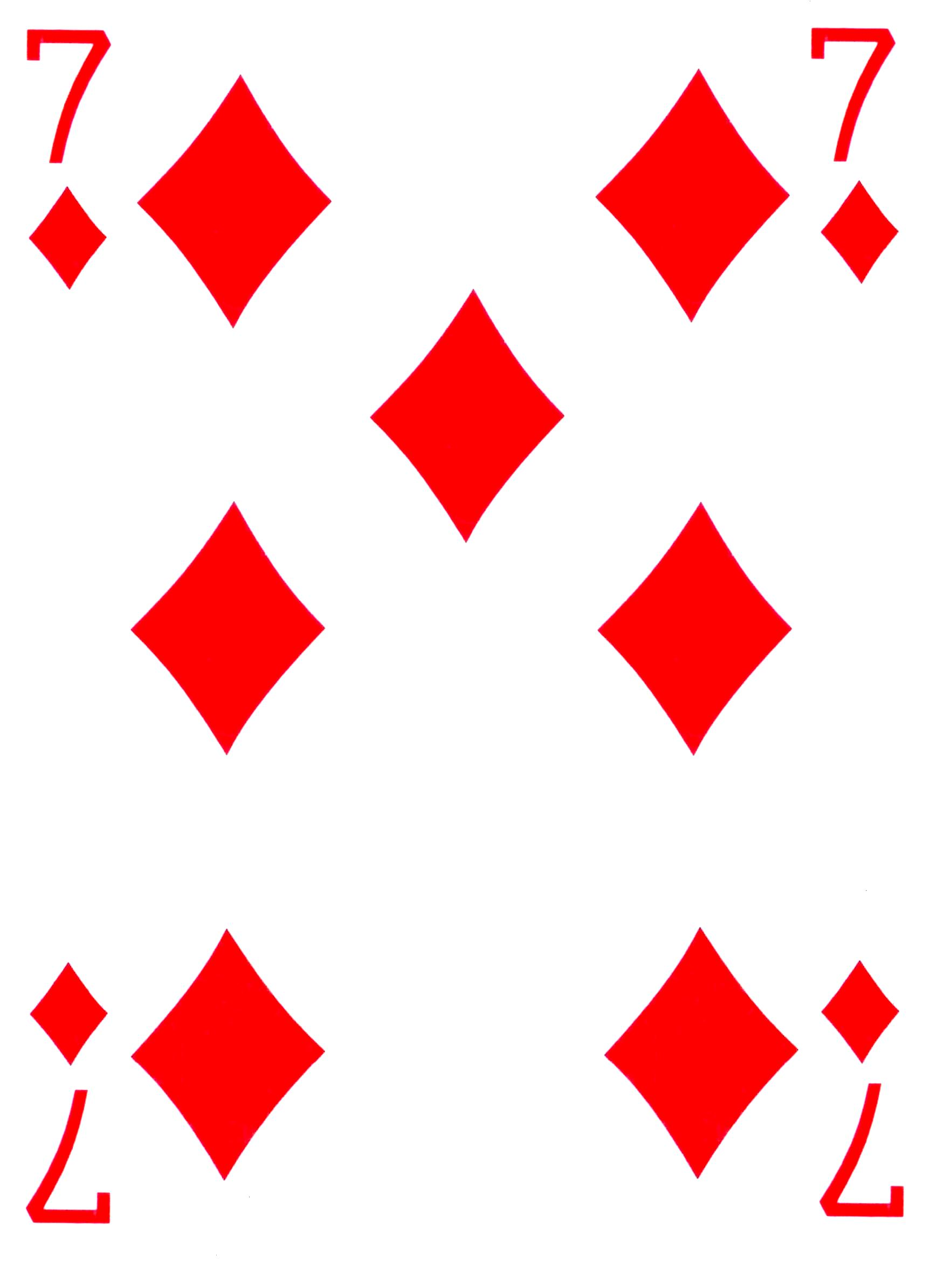
- ♦7 is always a stop in the 1885 Hoyle rules
- Origin: England
- Alternative names: Stops, Boodle
- Type: Matching
- Family: Stops group
- Players: variable
- Skills: low skill, high random chance
- Cards: 52 cards
- Deck: French

Related games
- Queen Nazarene • Pope Joan

Newmarket is an English card game of the matching type for any number of players. It is a domestic gambling game, involving more chance than skill, and emerged in the 1880s as an improvement of the older game of Pope Joan. It became known in America as Stops or Boodle before developing into Michigan. In 1981, Newmarket was still the sixth most popular card game in Britain.

== History ==
Newmarket's predecessor was an English gambling game called Pope Joan that had an elaborate staking board in the shape of a rotating multi-compartment dish. Pope Joan's popularity waned in favour of Newmarket in the second half of the 19th century, but the latter was mentioned as early as 1820 in an account of a duke "losing considerably at Newmarket". Its earliest rules were published in the 1850s (Note: For example, Paris (1853), List of Books, p. 3, lists "Bohn's Handbook of Games" which features Newmarket in Volume 2; and Southey (1853), p. 27 lists "Round Games", one of the Club Series, which also includes Newmarket.) and another early description appears in The Bazaar, Exchange and Mart in 1875; it differs from later rules in that no spare hand is dealt to increase the number of stop cards.

In America, the game was also known as Newmarket to begin with, but later became known as Stops or Boodle before being superseded there by Michigan in the 1920s. Newmarket continues to be played in the UK, although, like Michigan in the US, it is being displaced by games of the Eights family. The 1885 American Hoyle contains the earliest transatlantic rules for Newmarket.

Different rules use different cards on the staking layout which are from a second pack, except where stated. These cards became known as boodles or boodle cards in America. Other names include money cards, luxuries or, in an allusion to the Newmarket Racecourse, horses.

- Heather (1875) – ♦K ♠Q ♣Kn ♥10
- Dick (1885) – ♠A ♥K ♣Q ♦Kn
- "Trumps" (1897) – ♥A ♦K ♠Q ♣Kn
- Dawson (1923) – ♠A ♥K ♣Q ♦J
- Phillips (1957) – ♥A ♦K ♠Q ♣J
- Parlett (1979) - ♠A ♥K ♣Q ♦J
- Arnold (1988) – an A, K, Q and J of different suits.
- McLeod (2000) – ♥A ♣K ♦Q ♠J
- Kansil (2001) – ♥A ♣K ♦Q ♠J
- Parlett (south London, 2008) – all four Ks from pack used for play. Stakes collected when Q of same suit is played.
- Parlett ("original rules") – an A, K, Q and J of different suits.

== Newmarket (1885) ==
An early description of the rules is given in 1885 edition of The American Hoyle on which the following is based:

=== Preliminaries ===
Newmarket is a round game for any number of players using a pack of 52 French-suited cards from which the ♦8 has been removed. It requires a staking board to which the following cards from a second pack have been affixed: ♠A ♥K ♣Q ♦Kn.

Any player shuffles the pack, has it cut by the person to his right and then deals one card, face up, to each player in clockwise order beginning with eldest hand (the player to his left). As soon as any player receives a Knave, he becomes the first dealer.

=== Stakes ===
Players stake an agreed number of chips upon any of the cards on the staking layout, distributing them as they choose. The dealer stakes double the amount in likewise fashion.

=== Deal and play ===
The pack is shuffled and cut before the cards are dealt in entirety, individually, beginning with eldest hand again. He also deals an extra hand for stops immediately before dealing to himself. There are no trumps.

Eldest leads the lowest card of any suit that he has and names the card as he does so. The player with the next higher card in suit sequence plays and names it. The cards rank from Ace (lowest) to King (highest). Play continues in this way until a stop is reached. A player may play several cards in succession as long as they are in suit sequence.

A stop is a card that stops the sequence continuing because no-one holds it or because it is the highest card; so the four Kings and the ♦7 are always stops. Also a card ranking immediately below a card in the spare hand are stops. When a stop is played, all the cards are turned face down and the player of the stop (the last card to be played), leads to the next round by playing the lowest card he has of any suit.

If a player plays any of the cards on the staking layout, he sweeps the stakes on that card. If the stakes on any card are not claimed during the round (e.g. because that card is in the spare hand), they remain in place for the next round. If any are left at the end of the session, they are claimed by lot.

Play continues until someone has got rid of all their cards and says "out!" He earns from each other player one chip for each card that player holds.

== Newmarket (2011) ==
The following modern rules are based on Arnold (2011). The main differences from Dick are:

- The ♦8 is not removed from the pack
- Any K, Q, J and 10 may be used as staking cards as long as they are of different suits. They have picked up the American nickname of boodles.
- There is a separate pool which the winner sweeps instead of claiming a chip per card held by his adversaries
- Stakes are prescribed: one to the pool and four to the staking layout

=== Preliminaries ===
A standard pack is used with cards ranking in their natural order, Aces low. A King, Queen, Jack and Ten from a second pack are laid in a row on the table; these are called boodles. (Note: Boodle is an American term that lends its name to an alternative name for the game in North America.) Deal and play are clockwise. Any player may shuffle and then distribute the cards, individually, until a Jack appears, whereupon the player who received the Jack, will deal first.

=== Stakes ===
Each player antes five chips: one to a central pool and the other four to the boodles in any combination he chooses.

=== Play ===
The cards are now dealt, singly and in rotation, to each player and, lastly, to a spare hand that is not subsequently touched. Eldest leads by playing any card face up as long as it is the lowest card he holds of that suit. The player with the next higher card in suit sequence now plays it; players may thus play more than one card in succession. Players announce the name of the card as they play and place the card in front of them, not in a common pile or run. This continues until the sequence reaches the King or no-one has the next higher card because it is in the spare hand. Once again, the stops are the Kings and any card immediately below a card in the spare hand. When a sequence stops, the player who played last starts a new sequence with a card that is the lowest of its suit in his hand. Whenever a player plays a card that matches a boodle, he claims the stakes on it. The first player to go out by shedding all his cards sweeps the pool and the next deal starts.

== Michigan ==
Michigan is a US version of Newmarket and differs from the 2011 version of Newmarket in the following respects:

- The boodles are an A, K, Q and J of different suits, not the K, Q, J and 10
- Aces are high
- There is no pool. Players ante one chip to each boodle, while the dealer antes two to each
- The spare hand is dealt first, not last. It is a widow with which the dealer may exchange his hand
- Players must change suit when a suit is stopped
- Winning: as in the earliest rules, the winner collects from each adversary one chip per card held in the hand

Arnold points out that both Newmarket and Michigan have a considerable number of variations.

== Bibliography ==
- Arnold, Peter (1995) [1988]. The Book of Card Games. New York: Barnes & Noble.
- Arnold, Peter (2011). Chambers Card Games. London: Chambers Harrap.
- Southey, Robert (1853). Cowper's Works by Southey. London: Bohn.
- Dick, William Brisbane (1885). The American Hoyle. Dick & Fitzgerald, New York. Full view.
- Harcourt, Seymour (1820). The Gaming Calendar and Annals of Gaming. London: Stockdale.
- Heather, H.E. (1875). "Newmarket" in The Bazaar, Exchange and Mart, September 11, 1875. London.
- Kansil Joli Quentin (2001). Bicycle Official Rules of Card Games, 90th edn. Cincinnati: USPC.
- Lock, Ward (1994). The Complete Book of Card Games. London: Magna.
- Paris, Matthew (1853). The Flowers of History, Vol. 1. London: Bohn.
- Parlett, David (1979). The Penguin Book of Card Games, Allen Lane, London. ISBN 0-71-391149-2
- Parlett, David (1991). A History of Card Games, OUP, Oxford. ISBN 0-19-282905-X
- Parlett, David (2008). The Penguin Book of Card Games, Penguin, London. ISBN 978-0-141-03787-5
- Phillips, Hubert (1957). Culbertson's Card Games Complete. Watford: Arco.
- "Trumps" (1894). The American Hoyle, 15th edn. Dick & Fitzgerald, New York.
