= Queen Nazarene =

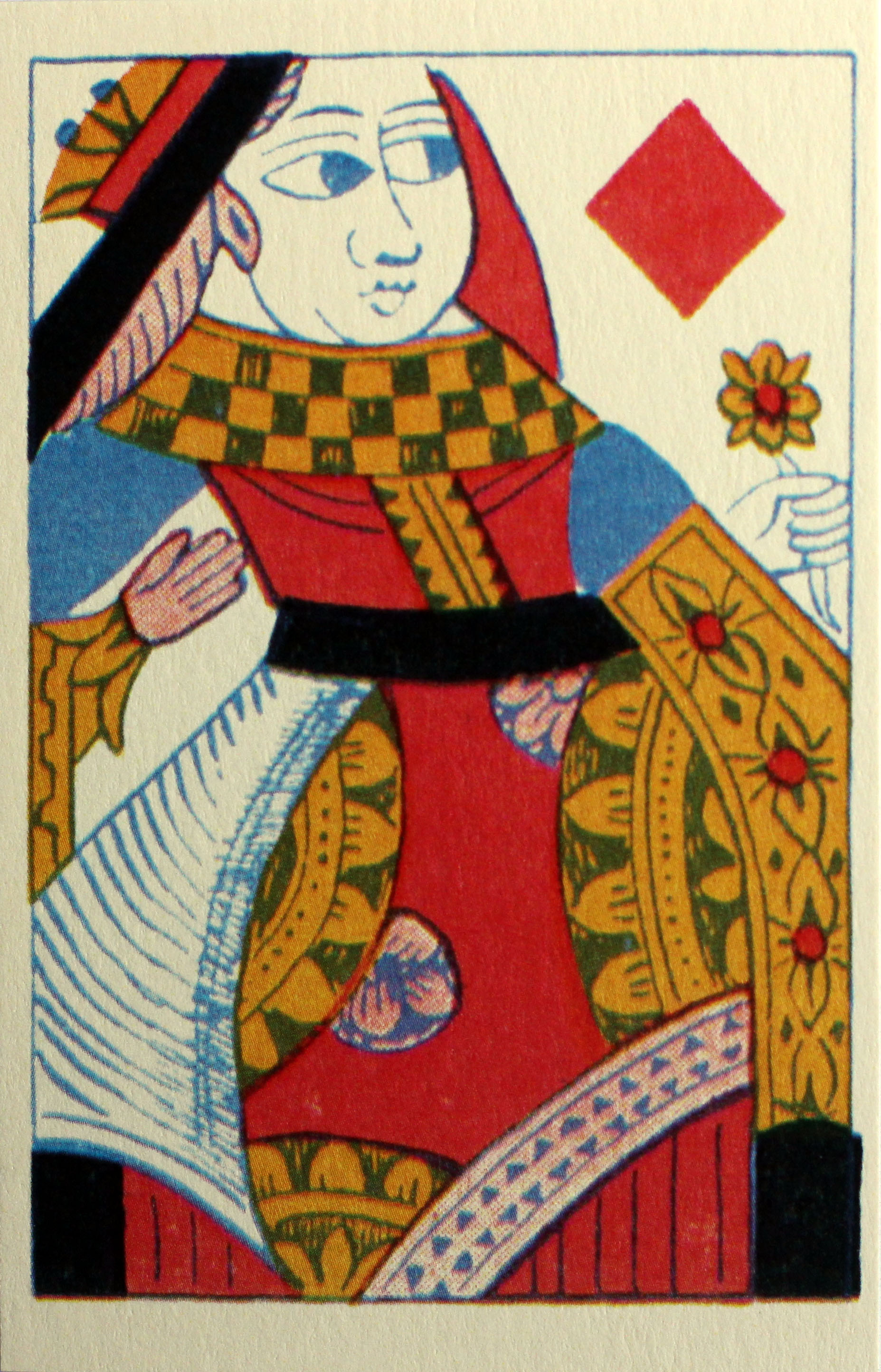
- Queen Nazarene
- Origin: England
- Alternative names: Queen Nazareen
- Type: Matching
- Family: Stops group
- Players: up to 10
- Skills: Attention
- Cards: 52 cards
- Deck: French
- Chance: Easy

Related games
- Newmarket, Pope Joan

Queen Nazarene or Queen Nazareen is an old English card game recorded by Charles Cotton as early as 1674. It is an ancestor of Newmarket.

== Rules ==
The following is the description in Cotton's 1674 rules:

There may as many play at this Game as the Cards will allow of, five Cards are dealt to every Player. The Queen of Diamonds is Queen Nazareen, and he that hath it, demands three apiece of every Player. The Knave of Clubs is called Knave Knocher, and he that hath it challengeth two apiece. If women play among men it is customary for Knave Knocher to kiss Queen Nazareen. Lastly, he that lays down a King the last Card that is plaid challengeth one, and begins again; and he that hath first plaid away his Cards demands as many Counters as there are Cards in the hands of the rest.

— Charles Cotton, The Compleat Gamester, (1674)

The rules were reprinted, with minor changes, in all editions of The Compleat Gamester until the 8th edition in 1754.

== Bibliography ==
- Cotton, Charles (1674) The Compleat Gamester. London: A.M.
- Johnson, Charles (1754). The Compleat Gamester. 8th edn. London: J. Hodges.
- Parlett, David (1991). A History of Card Games, OUP, Oxford. ISBN 0-19-282905-X
