= Pope Julius (card game) =

Card game

Pope Julius, or Pope July, is a gambling card game of the 16th century for four or more players. Players included King Henry VIII and it appears to have been one of his and Anne Boleyn's favourite pastimes.

Very little is known about the game, and its existence is known to be attested only by three written sources, those being:

- c. 1521 - John Skelton, Speke, parrot
  Of Pope Julius cardys he ys chefe cardynall.
- 1532 - anon, Privy Purse Expences of King Henry VIII (30 November 1532)
  Itm the xx daye delifed to the kingf grace at Stone whiche his grace loste at pope Julius game to my lady marques, m! Bryan and maister Weston
- c. 1596 - Sir John Harington, A Treatise on Playe, in Nugae antiquae (1769)
  Pope Julio (if I fail not in the name, and sure I am that there is a game of the cards after his name) was a great and wary player, a great vertue in a man of his profession

Some sources speculate that it was the precursor to the game of Pope Joan.
