= Pope Joan (card game) =

18th century card game

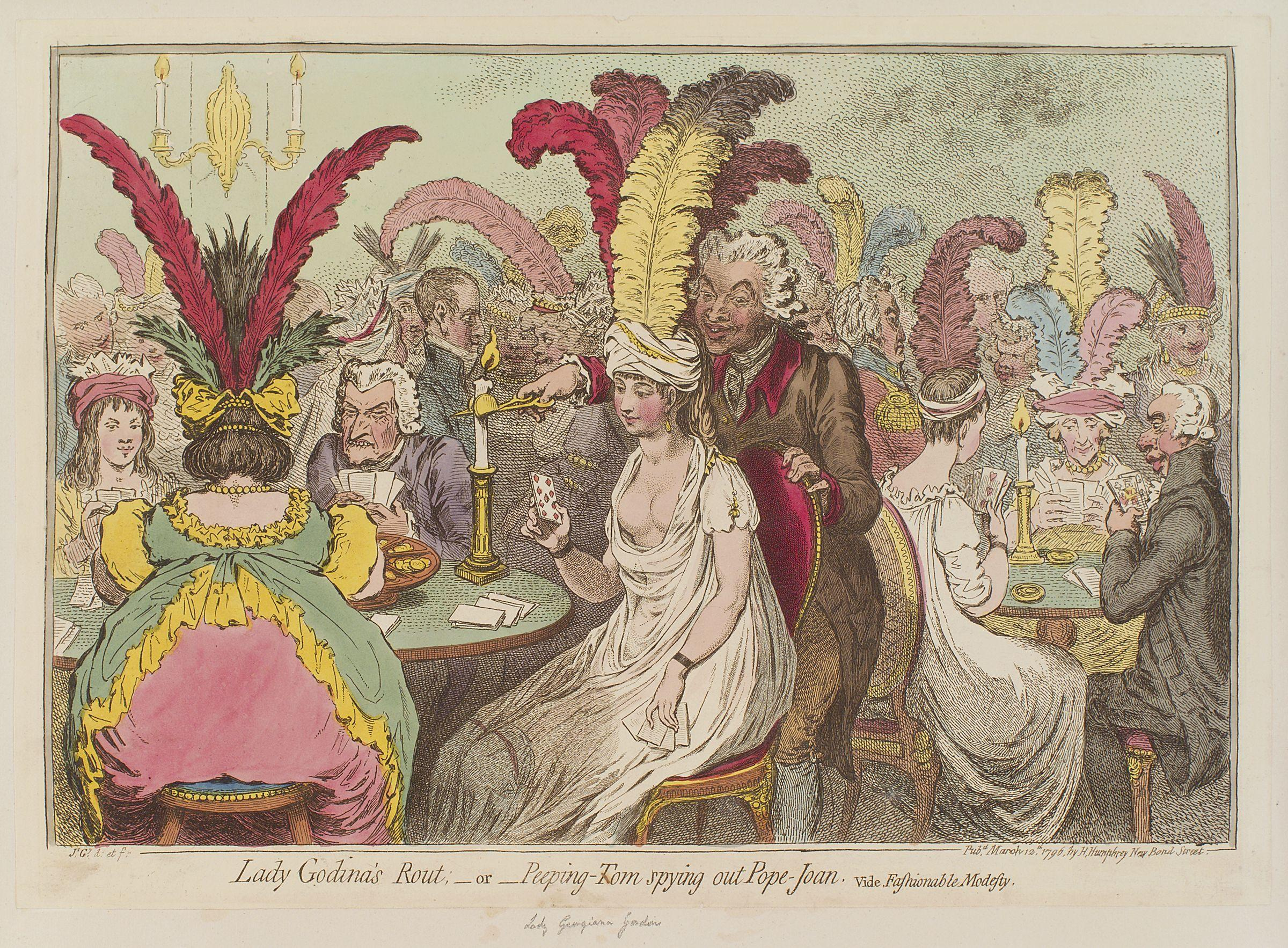
- 1796 caricature by James Gilray showing Lady Georgiana Gordon holding the Pope (the 9♦) in a game of Pope Joan
- Origin: England
- Type: Matching
- Family: Stops group
- Players: 3-8
- Skills: Attention
- Cards: 51 cards
- Deck: French
- Play: Clockwise
- Playing time: 20 min.
- Chance: Easy

Related games
- Michigan • Nain Jaune • Newmarket • Poch • Queen Nazarene

Pope Joan or Pope, a once popular Victorian family game, is an 18th-century English round game of cards for three to eight players derived from the French game of Matrimony and Comete and ancestor to Spinado and the less elaborate Newmarket. The game is related to the German Poch and French Nain Jaune.

Although its first published rules appeared in Hoyle's Games edition of 1814, an earlier reference to the game, originally called Pope Julius, appeared in The Oxford English Dictionary in 1732.

== Etymology ==
The name is a corruption of nain jaune ("yellow dwarf"), the name of 7♦ in France where the game originated. Pope Joan refers to the legend that Pope John VIII was actually a woman. As the Catholic Church denies a female pope, the legend was used as Protestant propaganda in the Victorian era, which also explains the popularity of the game in Scotland. The 9♦ is sometimes called the Curse of Scotland.

== Setup ==
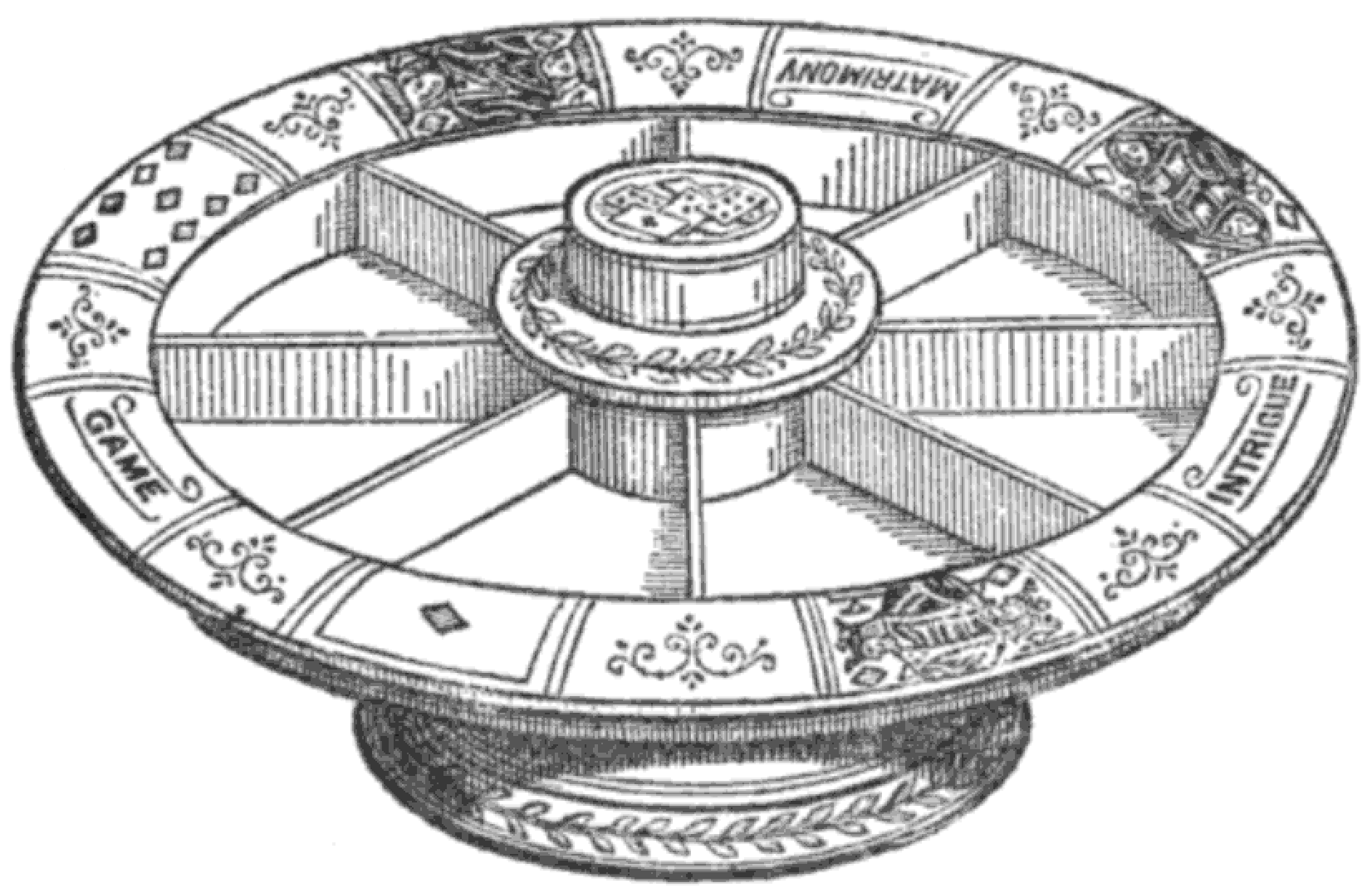
A Pope Joan staking board

A staking board is required, with eight compartments labelled Ace, King, Queen, Jack, Game, Pope (9♦), Matrimony (K Q of trumps) and Intrigue (Q J of trumps). Each player receives a number of counters, or chips, whose value is determined by the players involved in the game. The 8♦ is then removed from the pack to form a stop sequence, which classifies the game as a sub-group of the stop family of games. The aim of the game is to run out of cards before anyone else.

== Play ==
The dealer "dresses the board" by placing a stake of six counters in the compartment labelled Pope, two each to Matrimony and Intrigue, and one to each of the others. He then deals the 51 cards among the players as far as they go, but to one more hand than there are players, with the last card dealt to the dead hand turned for trump. Cards in excess may be dealt to "stops," or an agreed number may be left for that purpose, so that all players have an equal number of cards. If it is Pope (9♦), or the Ace, King, Queen or Jack, the dealer wins the contents of the appropriate compartment outright.

Eldest leads first playing a card face up to the table. It may be of any suit, as long as it is his lowest card. For this purpose, cards rank A 2 3 4 5 6 7 8 9 10 J Q K. If he has the next higher card of the same suit, he plays it too, and so on until he can go no further. The sequence is then continued by the player who holds the next card up, and if no one can play the next card up because it is in the dead hand, or because a King has been reached, a new sequence is started by the player who played the last card ("stop card"). As before, it may be of any suit, but must be the lowest he has of it. All Kings are of course stops, also the 7♦; also the cards next below the table cards, as well as the cards next below the played cards.

The content (if any) staked to the Ace, King, Queen and Jack compartment goes to the player playing the said trump card, as does that for Pope. That for Intrigue can only be won if the same player is able to play Queen and Jack, as does Matrimony for King and Queen, if all three, those in the two compartments, and if they are in different hands these counters are sometimes divided. If any stake is not won, it is then carried forward to the next deal.

The first to play out all of his cards wins the stake for Game, plus one counter from each other player for each card remaining in his hand, except the player holding the Pope who is excused payment.

== Strategy ==
The game only requires minimal attention in order to know what stops have been made in the course of play. The Pope card is sometimes considered a universal "stop."
