= Hand game (cards) =

Type of contract in card games

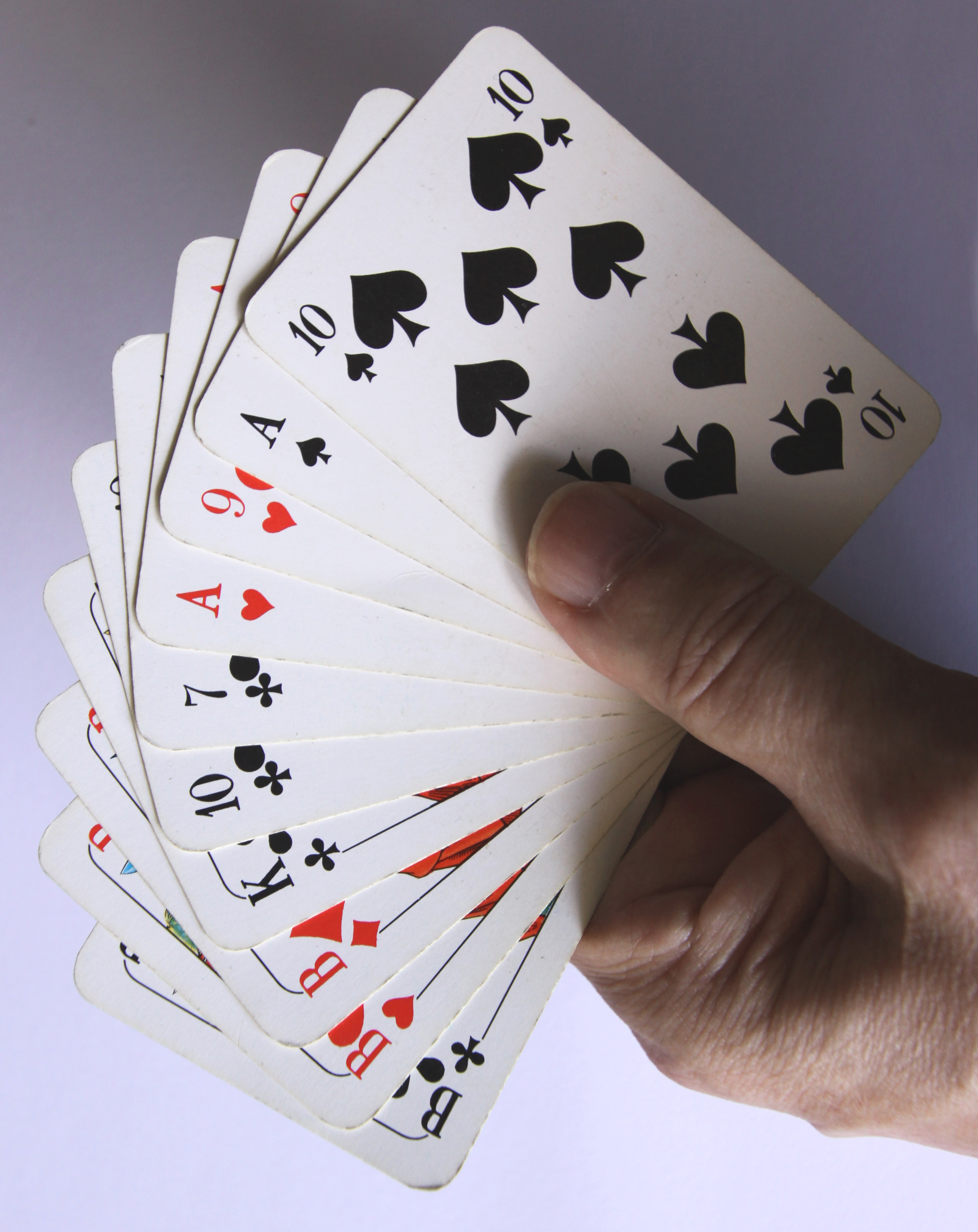
A Skat hand. The soloist playing a hand game may not exchange any of these cards for the skat

The term hand game is used in a number of card games, and can refer to a game where a player draws no additional cards and plays only from the hand, a game where a player uses both his or her own hand and that of an opponent, or a move where a player is able to play the entire hand of cards in one turn.

== Skat ==
In Germany's national game, Skat, a Hand game (Handspiel) is one in which the soloist does not pick up the two cards of the skat and only plays from the hand cards. A Hand game is a contract and thus worth more than a normal game.

== Rommé ==
Hand games are also known in Rommé where the term Hand-Rommé is also used. A hand game in this case is where the player melds all hand cards at once. If a player does so, the normal 40-point rule is waived. In a Hand-Rommé, penalty points awarded to the opponents are doubled. The advantage of playing a hand game is that it affords no opportunity to the other players to lay off cards against one's melds. The disadvantage is that, if the game is lost, it is likely to be very expensive in terms of minus points.

== Bridge ==
In Bridge a hand game is where a player plays as a soloist using his or her own hand and that of the partner which, however, is placed face up on the table.

== Haferltarock ==
In Haferltarock, as in Skat, a Hand game (Handspiel) is one in which the player undertakes to play from the hand cards only and not use the stock, although the points in it will count to them at the end.
