= Wendish Schafkopf =

German four-player card game

- Origin: Germany
- Type: Point-trick
- Players: 4
- Cards: 24 or 32
- Deck: Bavarian or French
- Play: Clockwise

Related games
- German Schafkopf
- Obers, Unters and Diamonds are permanent trumps

Wendish Schafkopf (German: Wendischer Schafkopf), Wendisch or Wendsch is an old German card game for four players that is still played today. It uses a Schafkopf pack of German-suited cards or a Skat pack of French playing cards.

== History ==
Wendish Schafkopf is absent from the nine different versions of Schaafkopf published in 1811 in Hammer's compendium Die deutsche Kartenspiele and subsequent editions up to 1817, suggesting it is of later provenance. Its rules first appear in 1853, appended by von Alvensleben to a reprint of Hammer's text, where it is described as a "combination of Solo and Schaafkopf" It is a primarily a four-handed game, but a three-player version is also described. Von Alvensleben's account is unclear on the rules of play and aspects of the scoring.

In 1861, a more detailed description is given by Hirzel, who also mentions a six-hand version of the game in which two side suit 8s are removed and each player receives 5 cards. In this variant there are two teams with three players each.

In the mid-19th century the game was played by Wends in Lower Lusatia. Pohlens (1882) recalls that "the civil servant, landowner, teacher and clergyman are busy all day long, everyone on their feet and in his sphere of activity, but after work, the long pipe was lit and people gathered once or twice a week, once at councillor’s, at other times at the pastor's or cantor's, in the garden in the summer, in the living room in the winter with simple beer and bread and butter with a Wendish Schafkopf and a dozen counters worth three pfennigs each. Once a week the whole company came together in the Kretscham, the game tables were already set up in the separate room - the fat landlady had put on a clean bonnet and an extra happy face - and after a few comfortable hours of very simple pleasures, everyone left happy and satisfied and headed home."

In 1882 Georgens & Gagette-Georgens claim that the original form of Schafkopf (describing Hammer's Type A) is called Wendish Schafkopf, but this appears to be a misreading of von Alvensleben. The error is repeated by Alban von Hahn (1905 and 1909) and compounded by several modern sources claiming that Doppelkopf is derived from Wendish Schafkopf instead of German Schafkopf.

Two significant changes in the rules appears in 1899. First, any player could now announce a Solo regardless of whether the top two cards were held. Second, the Ten is high; promoted above the King and ranking immediately below the Ace. Otherwise the rules of the four-hand game, which are still regularly published, have changed little since, except that French-suited cards are now described instead of German-suited ones. (Note: e.g. See Danyliuk (2017).) Whether it is still played is not known.

The name "Wendish" was often used in 19th century Germany to refer to Slovenes, but also to Slavs in general.

== Aim ==
The aim of the game is for each partnership of two to score at least 61 card points by taking tricks.

== Cards ==
=== Ranking ===
Each suit consists of 6 (24-card game) or 8 cards (32-card game) whose ranking in terms of trick-taking power (beginning with the highest) is: Ace (Ass) > Ten (Zehner) > King (König) > Nine (Neuner) > Eight (Achter) > Seven (Siebener). The Queens (Damen) or Obers and Jacks (Buben) or Unters do not count as part of their suits, but act as permanent trumps (see below).

=== Card points ===
Card value	Symbol	Points
Ace	A	11
Ten	10	10
King	K	4
Queen	Q/O	3
Jack	J/U	2
Nine	9	0
Eight	8	0
Seven	7	0

=== Trumps ===
The trumps are fixed from the start. If playing with a French-suited pack, the highest trumps are the Queens in the sequence Clubs, Spades, Hearts and Diamonds. Then follow the Jacks in the same ranking order. As an additional suit, Diamonds are always trumps, the hierarchy of the card values within the trump suit remaining (see above). In a German-suited pack the highest trumps are the Obers in the sequence Acorns, Leaves, Hearts and Bells, followed by the Unters in the same order and then the rest of the permanent trump suit of Bells.

As a result, there is a total of 14 trumps. The two top Queens, Q♣ and Q♠, or, in a German- suited pack, the two top Obers, O and O, are known as the Old Ones (Alten). The players with the Old Ones play as partners against the other two.

Hierarchy of cards in a normal game
Trump ranking in a normal game (highest to lowest)
Q♣ | Q♠ | Q♥ | Q♦ | J♣ | J♠ | J♥ | J♦ | A♦ | 10♦ | K♦ | 9♦ | 8♦ | 7♦
Ranking within the remaining card suits (highest to lowest)
Clubs	Spades	Hearts
A♣ | 10♣ | K♣ | 9♣ | 8♣ | 7♣	A♠ | 10♠ | K♠ | 9♠ | 8♠ | 7♠	A♥ | 10♥ | K♥ | 9♥ | 8♥ | 7♥

== Playing ==
=== Dealing ===
The dealer is chosen by lot; the player who draws the highest card becomes the dealer. The cards are dealt in 2 packets of 4 cards each, giving a hand of 8 cards.

=== Contracts ===
==== Normal game ====
Wendish Schafkopf is a game of partners. The players with the two Old Ones always form a team. If one player is dealt both, he has 2 options. The first is to choose a partner by saying something like "the Ace of Leaves is with me" or "I'll have the Ace of Clubs". The player with that card becomes his partner, but must play that card as soon as possible. He can also say "the first to win a trick is with me" whereupon the first other player to take a trick becomes the partner. The second option is that the player opts to go Solo against the other 3 players.

==== Hochzeit ====
If a player has both Old Ones in his hand, he may decide whether to play a Solo or a Hochzeit ("Wedding"). If he goes for a Hochzeit, he 'calls' (ruft) his playing partner. Unlike Bavarian Schafkopf it does not have to be an ace, the player may choose any card. He can however specify that the person who takes the first trick will be his partner. He announces this by saying "the first of you to take a trick is with me!" ( "Der erste fremde Stich geht mit!").

==== Solo ====
If a player with both Old Ones thinks his hand is strong enough to contest the game alone, he doesn't say anything (like the "Quiet Wedding", stille Hochzeit in Doppelkopf) and plays a Quiet Solo (stilles Solo) against the other players. Trumps remain the same.

In the Lust Solo contract, a player announces immediately after the cards are dealt, that he will play on his own. Queens and Jacks / Obers and Unters remain the permanent trumps. The additional trump suit may be specified by the soloist. As well as Diamond Solo (Karo-Solo), he may announce Club Solo (Kreuz-Solo), Spade Solo (Pik-Solo) or Heart Solo (Herz-Solo). The soloist in Lust Solo does not have to have the two black Queens. By agreement it can be specified that each player must play a certain number of Solo rounds within a game; this is known as Muss Solo.

=== Trick-playing rules ===
In Wendish Schafkopf players must follow suit (Farbzwang), which means that they must always play a card of the same suit as that led. There is no compulsion to win the trick (Stichzwang) nor does a player have to play a trump card (Trumpfzwang) if he isn't able to follow suit.

== Scoring ==
The side with the Old Ones (or the soloist) wins if they have scored at least 61 points. The side with fewer than 30 points is Schneider and a side with no tricks at all is Schwarz ("black"). Scoring is determined on the basis of prior agreement. It is customary to play from a kitty into which each player deposits a certain amount of coins or counters before the start of the game.

== Variants ==
As in many card games, there are several variants of Wendish Schafkopf:

=== Dreiwendsch ===
Basically the same rules apply to the three-player game Dreiwendsch as for Wendish Schafkopf except that there are no partnerships. The dealing of cards is the same as in Skat, packets of 3-4-3. However, two cards are not placed in the middle after 1st packet, but only after 2nd packet. These 2 cards are taken up by the player with the O / Q♣ (or, if pre-agreed, by forehand) and exchanged for 2 others. This player becomes the soloist; the other two players together form the opposing team. In Dreiwendsch there are only solo games. If none of the three players wants to play a solo game, everyone plays against everyone else.

=== Dreiwendsch with sharp cards ===
This is a three-hand game with so-called 'sharp cards': all the nines, eights and sevens are removed from the deck, leaving only 20 cards in play. Each player is dealt 6 cards. In this variant, 2 cards are placed in the skat.

=== Two-Player Wendish Schafkopf ===
Also called Officers' Schafkopf, this game requires the full deck of 32 cards. Each player receives 16 cards: being dealt 2 rows of cards face down, with 4 cards face up on each row. A face-up card is then placed on each of these cards, so that each player has 8 cards face down and 8 cards face up. You are also not allowed to see your own hidden cards at the beginning. First you play with the visible cards. When a card is played, the face down card underneath it is turned over. Permanent trump cards are the Queens and Jacks as well as all cards in the suit of Diamonds. Otherwise the rules of the Wendish Schafkopf already described apply. The game bears a resemblance to Officers' Skat in terms of the distribution of cards, the game situation (cards revealed) and the game principle, but differs culturally, in the number of trumps and the pattern of cards used.

== Literature ==
- Danyliuk, Rita. 1 x 1 der Kartenspiele: Von Bridge über Poker und Skat bis Zwicken. 19th edition. Hanover: Humboldt (2017). pp. 38-42. ISBN 978-3-86910-367-9
- Georgens, Jan Daniels and Jeanne Marie von Gagette-Georgens (1882). Spiel und Sport. Leipzig & Berlin: Otto Spamer.
- Grupp, Claus D (1975/1979). Kartenspiele im Familien und Freundeskreis. Überarbeitete und neugestaltete Ausgabe. Originalausgabe. Falken, Niedernhausen/ Ts. ISBN 3-635-60061-X (Dreiwendsch variant)
- Hammer, Paul (1817) Taschenbuch der Kartenspiele. Leipzig: Weygandschen Buchhandlung. First published 1811.
- Hirzel, Dr. Heinrich (1861). Das Hauslexikon. Vol. 5. Leipzig: Breitkopf & Härtel.
- Kastner, Hugo & Gerald Kador Folkvord (2005). Die große Humboldtenzyklopädie der Kartenspiele. Humboldt, Baden-Baden. ISBN 3-89994-058-X
- Sirch, Walter (2008). Vom Alten zum Zwanzger - Bayerische Kartenspiele für Kinder und Erwachsene - neu entdeckt. Bayerischer Trachtenverband.
- von Alvensleben, Ludwig (1853). Encyclopädie der Spiele. Leipzig: Otto Wigand.
- Von Hahn, Alban (1909). Buch der Spiele. 5th edn. Leipzig: Otto Spamer.
- Walther, Erich (c. 1899). Das Schafkopfspiel: Schafkopf, Wendisch, Doppelkopf. Leipzig: Siegbert Schnurpfeil.
