= Herzblatt =

German card game

- A point-trick game of the ace–ten family
- Origin: Germany
- Alternative names: Herz Sticht, Herzblättchen
- Type: Point-trick
- Family: Ace–ten games
- Players: 2-5
- Cards: 32
- Deck: French-suited cards
- Rank (high→low): A 10 K Q J 9 – 7
- Play: Assumed clockwise
- Hearts are permanent trumps

Herzblatt or Herzblättchen is a German card game of the ace–ten family for two to five players. It bears a certain resemblance to the extinct 19th-century game of Piquesept, however without the special rules associated with the trump Seven.

== History and name ==
As Herzblättchen it is mentioned as early as 1952 on the ladies' page of a south Baden newspaper as being "treasured by adults" alongside Bridge, Skat and Tarock. The first rules for Herzblatt appear in a German games compendium in 1966 and has been published sporadically since, both in print and online. Herzblatt is German for "sweetheart", which is probably a play on words, since Herzblatt could also mean "Heart card" or "hand of Hearts". Herz Sticht literally means "Heart stabs" or, in card-play, "Hearts trump", while Herzblättchen is a diminutive of Herzblatt. The game is unrelated to the similar-sounding games of Herzla and Herzeln.

== Rules ==
The following rules are based on Braun (1966) except where stated. The aim of the game for the soloist is to score 66 points by winning tricks. The defenders' aim is to thwart this.

=== Cards ===
The game uses a standard 32-card French-suited pack usually of the Berlin pattern. Cards rank in the usual ace–ten order and the suit of hearts is always the trump suit, hence the name which means "heart card" or "heart hand". The values in card points are: Ace 11, Ten 10, King 4, Ober 3, Unter 2, remainder 0.

=== Players ===
Two to five players may play. (Note: Lembke: two to four; Muhr: three to four; Reichelt: three to five players.) If two play, however, the Sevens, Eights and Nines are removed and each player receives 9 cards; 2 remaining in the skat (Stock, Skat, Blinde, Talon). If three play, all the Sevens are removed along with the ♥8 and ♦8, and each player receives 8 cards; (Note: Lembke: all 7s and 8s are removed except for the two Hearts; Muhr: all 7s and 8s are removed and each player receives 7 cards, leaving 3 in the skat.) if four play, only the ♥8 and ♦8 are removed and each player receives 7 cards; (Note: Lembke: four players receive 6 cards, so presumably the same cards are in play as for three players; Muhr: no cards are removed, players receive 7 each and 4 go to the Blinde.) if five play, the full 32 cards are used and each player gets 6 cards. In every case, a skat of 2 cards is placed face down in the middle of the table.

=== Play ===
After the cards have been dealt, each player is asked in turn whether he wishes to become the soloist and plays against the others. If he does, he can say "(I'll play)" (ich spiele). Once the soloist is decided, he picks up the skat, adds it to his hand and discards 2 cards which count towards his score at the end. Forehand now leads to the first trick. Suit must be followed; a player unable to follow suit, must trump; only if unable to do either may a player discard. If a trump is led, subsequent players must overtrump if able. (Note: Lembke is alone in allowing players to trump or discard if unable to follow suit. Feder is silent on the rules of play.)

=== Scoring and settling ===
Players agree the stake to be played for at the start of the game. After the last trick has been taken, players tot up their points taken in tricks. If the soloist reaches 66 points (including any points in his two discards), he has won the deal. The score may be settled as follows:

- Soloist wins and receives a single stake from each defender.
- Soloist wins, the defenders having scored 33 or fewer points, and earns a triple stake from each defender.
- Soloist loses and pays a single or double stake to each defender as agreed.
- Soloist loses with 33 points or fewer, is schneider and pays four times the stake. (Note: Braun and Lembke say 30 points, but usually the schneider threshold is half the points needed to win i.e. 33 in this case.)

=== Variant ===
Muhr describes a variant in which the object for the soloist is simply to score more points than the defenders. However, before play the soloist may announce "66", an intention to score at least 66 points, or "Du", an intention to take all tricks. A defender may double with "contra" but only if they had no opportunity to bid. The soloist may redouble with "Ree". A 66 is worth double and a Du triple the game value. Winning or losing Schneider also doubles the game value.

== Related games ==
Herzblatt resembles the Frage contract of German Tarok and its descendant Bavarian Tarock. Braun also describes a game called Solo in which there is a suit hierarchy – Club Solo> Spade Solo > Heart Solo > Diamond Solo – and the player bidding the higher or highest contract becomes the declarer. Despite its name, they still exchange with the skat. If all pass, the last trick wins or the cards are redealt.

== Literature ==
- Braun, Franz (1966). Spielkarten und Kartenspiele (in German). Hanover: Fackelträger.
- Feder, Jan (1980). Die schönsten Kartenspiele (in German). Munich: Knaur.
- Lembke, Robert (1974). Das Große Haus- und Familienbuch der Spiele (in German). Cologne: Lingen.
- Muhr, Gisela (2014). Spritz'! Z'rück! Un' druff! (in German). Rheinbach: Regionalia. ISBN 978-3-95540-123-8.
- Reichelt, Hans (1987). Kartenspiele: von Baccara bis Whist (in German). Wiesbaden: Englisch.
