= German Schafkopf =

Card game

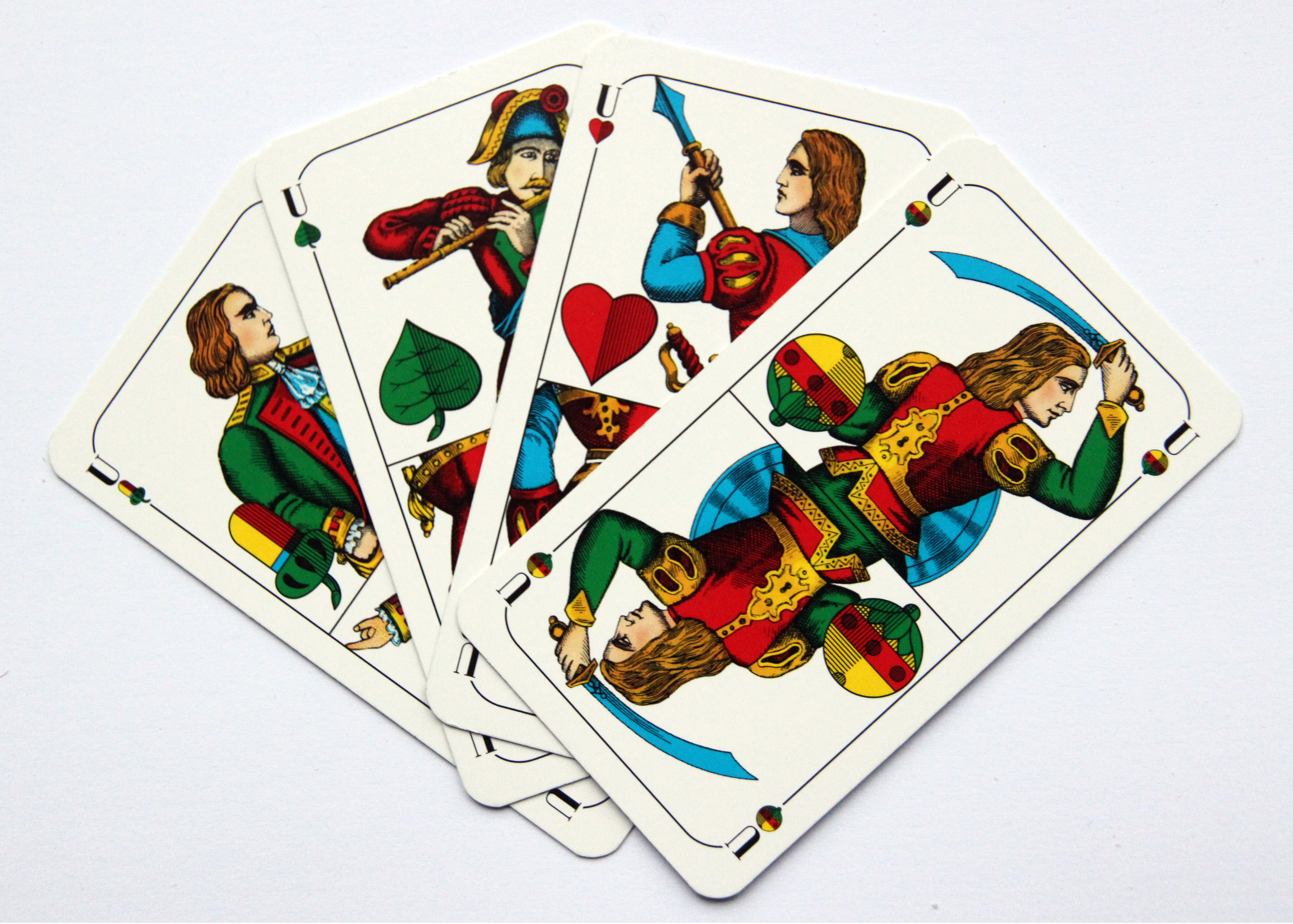
- The top trumps in the original Schafkopf game
- Origin: Germany
- Type: Point-trick
- Players: 4
- Cards: 32
- Deck: German or French
- Rank (high→low): (J) A K Q 10 9 8 7
- Play: Clockwise

Related games
- Doppelkopf • Schafkopf • Sheepshead • Skat

German Schafkopf (German: Deutscher Schafkopf) is an old German, ace–ten card game that is still played regionally in variant form today. It is the forerunner of the popular modern games of Skat, Doppelkopf and Bavarian Schafkopf. It originated in Leipzig in the Electorate of Saxony. (Note: All the earliest references were published in Leipzig and there is very early evidence of it being played at the University there. See History section.) Today it is hardly ever played in its original form, but there are a number of important national and regional derivations.

== History ==
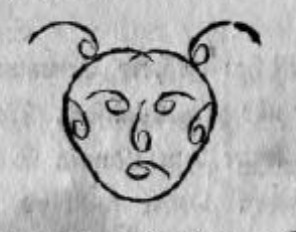
Sheep's head used for scoring according to Hammer (1817)

The word, variously spelt Schafkopf, Schafskopf, Schaffskopf, Schafskopff, Schaafkopf and Schaafskopf, appears as early as the 16th century and meant "sheephead" or "sheep's head", but was also a pejorative term for a "fool". An early example is in the 1676 German-Italian dictionary, where "Schafskopff" is equated to "Dumshirn" i.e. "dumb head". In 1777, Adelung's dictionary records "Schafskopf" as the head of a sheep, but also as "Schafskopf or Schafkopf, an abusive term for a stupid, simple-minded person", but there is no reference to the game.

The card game of Schafkopf dates to the 18th century or earlier and is the oldest member of its eponymous family. It emerged in Leipzig, virtually all early references being published in that city. It first appears in Hartmann's play Die dankbare Tochter (1780) where Platz says "I think we'll play a Schaafkopf". A 1783 novel published in Leipzig describes the scene after a wedding dinner as the dining tables were cleared away and replaced by games tables: "here stood an Ombre table, there a noble Schafkopf was played, over there a game of forfeits, soon everybody was busy playing when suddenly the sound of the strings announced the arrival of the dance band..."; the fact that the author felt no need to explain what Schafkopf was suggests it was already well known at that time. According to a 1789 journal, Schafkopf was played in Schweidnitz in the Duchy of Silesia and may have derived its name from being played while drinking non-local beer which went under the name of Schöps in the 17th century, Schafkopf and Schöps being synonyms for a fool. In 1796, we learn that students at Leipzig University liked to repair to disreputable bars to play Solo or Schafkopf for a couple of Dreiers. In 1803, it is described as "a cute little game [played] with chalk and collection bag pennies".

In 1811, the rules of Schaafkopf are recorded for the first time by Paul Hammer who notes that it has several regional names including Societätsspiel ("social game"), Konversationsspiel ("conversation game") and Denunciationsspiel ("announcement game"), the latter "because originally the trump suit and number of trumps had to be announced for each game." (Note: These alternative names are not known elsewhere in the literature.) Hammer says that the game is generally presumed to be called Schaafkopf ("sheep's head") because, as games were won, lines were drawn in the form of a head with horns. He recognises that the word means a naive and stupid person but argues that this name is quite inappropriate because there are few social games as enjoyable and uplifting as Schaafkopf. He goes on to describe in detail no less than nine variants of 'Schaafkopf', but states that the original one (his Type A) was a four-hand, point-trick, team game with 4 Unters as top trumps, known as Wenzels (Note: Pronounced "Ventsels") and a trump suit nominated by the bid winner. The game was normally played for beer. There were other variants for four, six or eight players with varying numbers of Wenzels. Some variants had Bells as the permanent trump suit and one was a plain-trick game; the rest being ace–ten games with the tens ranking low. The variants (denoted by their original letters) are tabulated below. Except where indicated, they are played by teams of two in fixed partnerships: Von Alvensleben (1853) largely reprints Hammer, but adds a tenth, quite different, version called Wendish Schafkopf which includes a three-hand variant.

Players	Cards	Wenzels	Trump suit	Plain/Point trick	Variant	Remarks
4	32	U U U U	Any	Point	A	Urschafkopf or Ur-Schafkopf (Note: Urschafkopf i.e. "Ancient Schafkopf".)
4	32	O O U U U U	Any	Point	C	
4	32	O O O O U U U U	Any	Point	D	cf. Bavarian Schafkopf
4	32	U U U U	Bells	Plain	B	No teams – Schellen-Schafkopf (Note: Schellen-Schafkopf i.e. "Bell Schafkopf".)
4	32	O O U U U U	Bells	Point	E	cf. Wendish Schafkopf
6	36	O O U U U U	Bells	Point	F	
4	2 x 24	2 x O O U U U U	Bells	Point	G	cf. Doppelkopf
6	2 x 24	2 x O O U U U U	Bells	Point	H	
8	2 x 32	2 x O O O O U U U U	Bells	Point	I	
4 (3)	32	O O O O U U U U	Bells	Point	Wendish	O and O form a team. Solo and call-Ace options.

Variant D has the same configuration as modern Bavarian Schafkopf, although the latter has Hearts as permanent trumps in the 'normal game', alliances rather than partnerships and various solo contracts. Meanwhile Doppelkopf looks like a merger of G, taking it from 12 to 16 Wenzels, and Wendish Schafkopf, with partnerships decided by the O and O. As early as 1840 there were two Doppelkopf clubs in Chemnitz, perhaps playing a game related to variants G, H and I. The calling of an Ace, probably originated in German Solo, but had been adopted in Bavarian Schafkopf and its sibling Obsern by the 1840s, before von Alvensleben published the first rules for the variant of Wendish Schafkopf in 1853.

In the 1830s it was confirmed as being "a card game common in Saxony". In 1831, Schafskopf was also very much in vogue in several parts of rural Thuringia,

In 1835, Skat inventor, Johann Friedrich Ludwig Hempel (1773-1849) from Altenburg, records a brief entry in Pierer's Universal-Lexikon in which Schafkopf is described as a game played with the German pack, usually by four players in partnership, the partners sitting opposite one another. It was named after the scoring system which involved chalking a sheep's head on the table. The first team to complete the head received the amount agreed by the players. Alternatively each hand was paid immediately after its completion. There were manifold variations which Hempel does not describe, but a common feature was that the game was won by the team with the most card points. He also describes the earliest two-handed variant of Schafkopf.

By 1836 it had reached Mecklenburg where "Schafskopf" was played by the lower classes exclusively with French-suited cards alongside Dreikart, Fünfkart and Solo, the dignitaries playing Whist, Boston, Ombre, Faro and, less often, Solo as well.

In 1853 Von Alvensleben reproduces Hammer's rules and describes Schaafkopf as being very common especially among the lower classes perhaps due to its ordinary name ("sheep's head"). In 1882 Georgens & Gagette-Georgens claim that the original form of Schafkopf is Wendish Schafkopf, but this is clearly a misreading of von Alvensleben.

In 1867, Schafskopf or Schafkopf was reported to be "especially popular in Saxony and further south."

An 1888 Mansfeld dialect dictionary lists Schôfkopp as a four-hand card game in which Bells are trumps and the four Obers and Unters are matadors. The players with the O (de Ole) and the O (de Paste or Paster) play together. The game was also known as Wendsch (= Wendish Schafkopf). However, in Hesse, Schafkopf was another name for the children's game of Black Peter.

John McLeod notes that many German game books include rules for German Schafkopf based on the original, but he is not aware of anywhere that it is still played. However his research has uncovered two descendants of the game lingering on in the Palatinate region of western Germany. One is Bauernstoss which is played in Erfweiler and the other is Alter Schoofkopp played in Niederhochstadt, around 30 kilometres to the east.

The Palatinate is also home to Bauerchen or Bauersches, a four-player, partnership game in which the four Jacks are top trumps in the usual Skat/Schafkopf order. It is played with a short pack (20 cards), forehand calls trumps and leads to the first trick. Melds for a King-Queen pair earn extra points.

Another game which appears to be a cross between German Schafkopf German Solo is the north German game of Scharwenzel, played by four or six players in fixed partnerships with four Wenzels but also the Q♣, trump 7 and ♠ as top trumps. It is a plain trick game in which players bid the number of potential trumps they have.

== Rules ==
The following rules appear to be based on Grupp (1994) and resemble those of the original Schafkopf game, i.e. von Alvensleben's Type A above.

=== Cards ===
==== Players and cards ====
German Schafkopf is played with 4 players and 32 cards which, depending on the region, may be German or French packs. The players form 2 permanent partnerships.

French suits
Diamonds	Hearts	Spades	Clubs
♦	♥	♠	♣
German suits
Bells	Hearts	Leaves	Acorns

==== Card values ====
French pack		German pack		
Card	Symbol	Card	Symbol	Points
Ace	A	Deuce	A/none	11
Ten	10	Ten	10	10
King	K	King	K	4
Queen	D	Ober	O	3
Jack	B	Unter	U	2
Nine	9	Nine	9	0
Eight	8	Eight	8	0
Seven	7	Seven	7	0

==== Card ranking ====
The ranking of cards within the individual suits is as follows (highest to lowest): Ace (Deuce) > King > Queen (Ober) > 10 > 9 > 8 > 7

The hierarchy of the cards and their sequence within the trumps are similar to those in Bavarian Schafkopf and Skat. However, in German Schafkopf the 10 ranks between the Queen or Ober and 9, in all suits even though it is worth ten points.

==== Trumps ====
German deck
Permanent trumps
U U U U
Additional variable trump suits
Acorns	Leaves	Hearts	Bells
A K O 10 9 8 7	A K O 10 9 8 7	A K O 10 9 8 7	A K O 10 9 8 7
French pack
Permanent trumps
J J J J
Additional variable trump suits
Clubs	Spades	Hearts	Diamonds
A K Q 10 9 8 7	A K Q 10 9 8 7	A K Q 10 9 8 7	A K Q 10 9 8 7

As in Skat, the highest trumps are the 4 Jacks or Unters in the sequence Clubs, Spades, Hearts and Diamonds or Acorns, Leaves, Hearts and Bells. The remaining trumps are specified by the player who is the declarer by naming the trump suit at the outset. The cards of the trump suit then follow in the aforementioned sequence (see above).

=== Partnerships ===
German Schafkopf is a partnership card game, but unlike Bavarian Schafkopf or Doppelkopf partners are not announced during the course of the game, but are permanent as in Bridge: the players facing one another are automatically partners. The seating order is determined by the drawing of playing cards before the game begins: the players who have picked the two highest cards are partners and sit opposite one another. In another variation, the players with the two black queens (or Ober of Acorns and Ober of Leaves) form a partnership (see below).

=== Rules ===
==== Dealing ====
After the cards have been shuffled and cut, each player is dealt a total of eight playing cards (in two sets of four) in clockwise fashion.

=== Declarations ===
After the deal, starting clockwise each player announces the maximum possible number of trumps in their hand by adding the jacks and the longest suit ("I declare x trumps").

The player with the highest number of possible trumps takes the lead in the game and names the trump suit.

If two players announce the same number of possible trumps, then the one with the higher number of trump points wins ("I declare x trumps with y points"); if this number is also the same, the higher trump wins (usually the higher jack).

==== Forced game ====
If none of the players can declare at least five trumps, the player with the Jack of Clubs (Unter of Acorns) must take the lead; if he loses, it only counts as single (i.e. he doesn't lose double or quadruple) game points.

==== Solo games ====
As in Bavarian Schafkopf and Doppelkopf, solo games are also possible in German Schafkopf. Here, a solo player plays against the other three players.

=== Play ===
Players must follow suit. If a player cannot do so, any card may be played.

=== Scoring ===
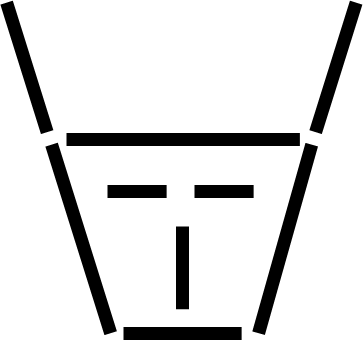
Example of a completed "sheep's head" used for scoring

There are three types of games won:

- Straight win (61 to 89 points scored): if the winner chose trumps he gets one game point, otherwise he gets two
- Schneider win (more than 90 points scored): if the winner chose trumps he gets two game points, otherwise four
- Schwarz win (opponents have no tricks): the winner gets nine game points, regardless of who chose trumps (nine dashes correspond to a whole sheep's head).

In a forced game, however, a winner who did not choose trumps gets the same as one who did.

For each game point won, the winner draws a line on a sheet of paper. The game is won by the first player to complete draw nine dashes in the shape of a sheep's head, the Schafkopf: four dashes arranged in a rectangle form the shape of the head, two dashes form the eyes, two more the horns and a single dash in the middle represents the nose. Presumably the losers buy the beer.

== Variants ==
The game described is the earliest form of German Schafkopf. Apart from Bavarian Schafkopf, Doppelkopf and the other early variants mentioned above, further variants have been developed, some in different regions. These include:

- Blattla, no Wenzels, Hearts as permanent trumps
- Bierkopf, a Franconian variant of Bavarian Schafkopf with fixed teams and no solos
- Mucken, another Franconian variant of Bavarian Schafkopf with different contracts
- Bauernstoß, which is played in the Palatine region of Erfweiler.
- Alte Schoofkopp, played in Niederhochstadt, another village in the Palatinate.

In an East German book of game rules there are the following variations of German Schafkopf which appear to reflect, in part, Hammer's variants:

1. Classic Schafkopf: as described, Jacks/Wenzel are always trumps, the player with the so-called 'old man', the Jack of Clubs or the Unter of Acorns, must choose trumps if all pass or cannot bid more than 5 trumps.
2. Schafkopf with six (eight) Wenzeln and changing trumps: Queen of Clubs (Ober of Acorns) and Queen of Spades (Ober of Leaves) (and Queen of Hearts (Ober of Hearts) and Queen of Diamonds (Ober of Bells)) are declared as trumps and outrank the old man. The player with the old man calls trumps, if this has not been decided beforehand by the bidding process.
3. Schafkopf with four (six, eight) Wenzels and remaining trumps: Jacks/Wenzel (plus the 2 highest Queens/Obers or all 4) and Diamonds/Bells are always trumps.

== Related games ==
There are numerous European relatives of the family:

- Kop is a Polish game is played with just 16 cards, with four per player by excluding all but the Ace, 10s, Queens, and Jacks.
- Sjavs is popular in the Faroe Islands where it is played with 32 cards.
- Scharwenzel is an old German game, possibly ancestral to German Schafkopf. It is now only played on the island of Fehmarn and, as Skærvindsel, in Denmark.

== See also ==
- Officers' Schafkopf

== Literature ==
- _ (1676). Il nuovo Dizzionario delle due Lingue Italiana-Tedesca et Tedesca-Italiana. Nuremberg.
- _ (1988). Spielregelbüchlein mit Skatordnung. p. 177, 8th edn., Spielkartenfabrik Altenburg.
- Adelung, Johann Christoph (1777). Versuch eines vollständigen grammatisch-kritischen Wörterbuches Der Hochdeutschen Mundart, (L–Scha). Fulda: Friedrich Carl.
- Bruckmann, Karl (1811). Karl Bruckmann oder William Sterne, Findling des Harzgebirges und Bewohner einer einsamen Insel der Südsee. Vol. 2, Zittau & Leipzig: J.D. Schöps
- Danyliuk, Rita (2008). 1 × 1 der Kartenspiele - Bridge, Skat und Schafkopf. Glücks- und Familienspiele. Patiencen, Kartentricks u.v.m. Humboldt, Baden-Baden, ISBN 978-3-89994-188-3
- Danyliuk, Rita (2008). Das große Taschenbuch der Freizeitspiele: Spiele für unterwegs und Schönwettertage, Munich: Humboldt, pp. 149–151.
- Kramer, Matthias (1702). Das herrlich-große Teutsch-Italiänische Dictionarium, Vol. 2. Nuremberg: Johann Andrea Endters Seel.
- Georgens, Jan Daniels and Jeanne Marie von Gagette-Georgens (1882). Spiel und Sport. Leipzig & Berlin: Otto Spamer.
- Grupp, Claus D. (1997). Doppelkopf, Schafkopf, Tarock. Niedernhausen/Ts.: Falken. ISBN 3-635-60223-X
- Hammer, Paul (1817) Taschenbuch der Kartenspiele. Leipzig: Weygandschen Buchhandlung. 1st published 1811.
- Hartmann, Andreas-Gottlieb (1780). Die dankbare Tochter oder die Einquartirung; ein ländliches Lustspiel mit Gesang in einem Aufzuge. 1st edn. Leipzig & Budißin: Jacob Deinzer.
- Hempel, Johann Friedrich Ludwig (1835). "Schafkopf (Spielk.)" in Universal-Lexikon oder vollständiges encyclopädisches Wörterbuch, 18th volume, Altenberg (S-Schlüpfrig) ed. by H.A. Pierer. Altenburg: Literatur-Comptoir.
- Hoffmann, Karl Friedrich Vollrath (1836). Deutschland und seine Bewohner, Vol. 4. Stuttgart: J. Scherble.
- Jecht, Richard Dr. (1888). Wörterbuch der Mansfelder Mundart. Eisleben: Ed. Winkler. Görlitz: Görlitzer Nachrichten und Anzeiger.
- Kaltschmidt, Jacob Heinrich (1834). Vollständiges stamm- und sinnverwandtschaftliches Gesammt-Wörterbuch der deutschen Sprache. Leipzig: Karl Tauchnitz.
- McLeod, John (1978). "Rules of Games: No. 8. Schafkopf" in The Journal of the Playing-Card Society, Vol. VII, No. 2. pp. 38–47. ISSN 0305-2133.
- Von Alvensleben, Ludwig (1853). Encyclopädie der Spiele. Leipzig: Otto Wigand.
