= Doppelkopf =

German card game

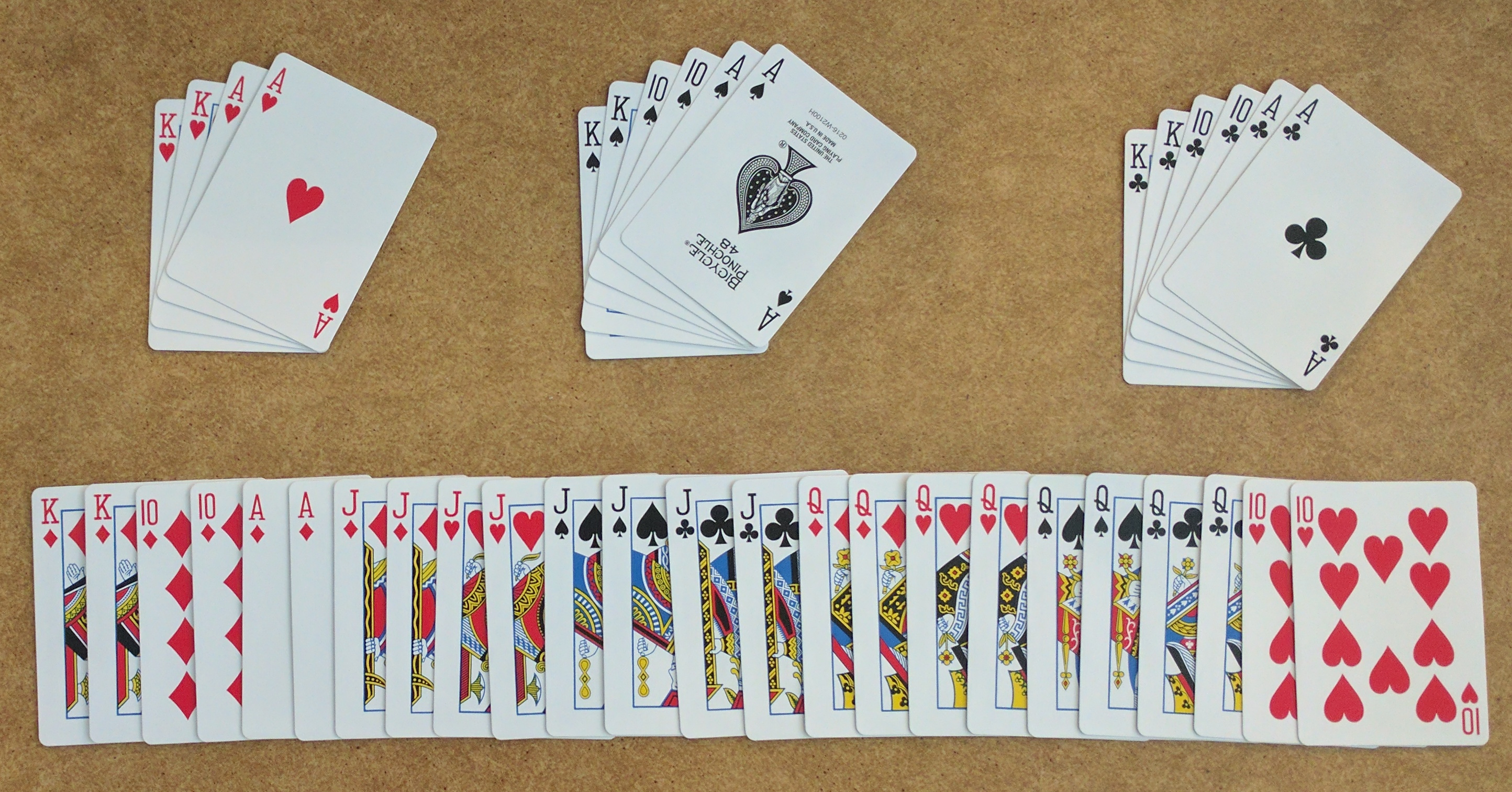
- A 40-card Doppelkopf pack (i.e., without nines).
- Origin: Germany
- Alternative name: Doko
- Type: Point-trick
- Players: 4
- Skills: Card counting, tactics, strategy
- Cards: 2 x 24 or 2 x 20
- Deck: Doppelkopf (modified French or German)
- Rank (high→low): A 10 K Q J 9 or A 10 K O U 9
- Play: Clockwise
- Playing time: 20 min.
- Chance: Low to moderate

Related games
- Schafkopf • Sheepshead • Skat

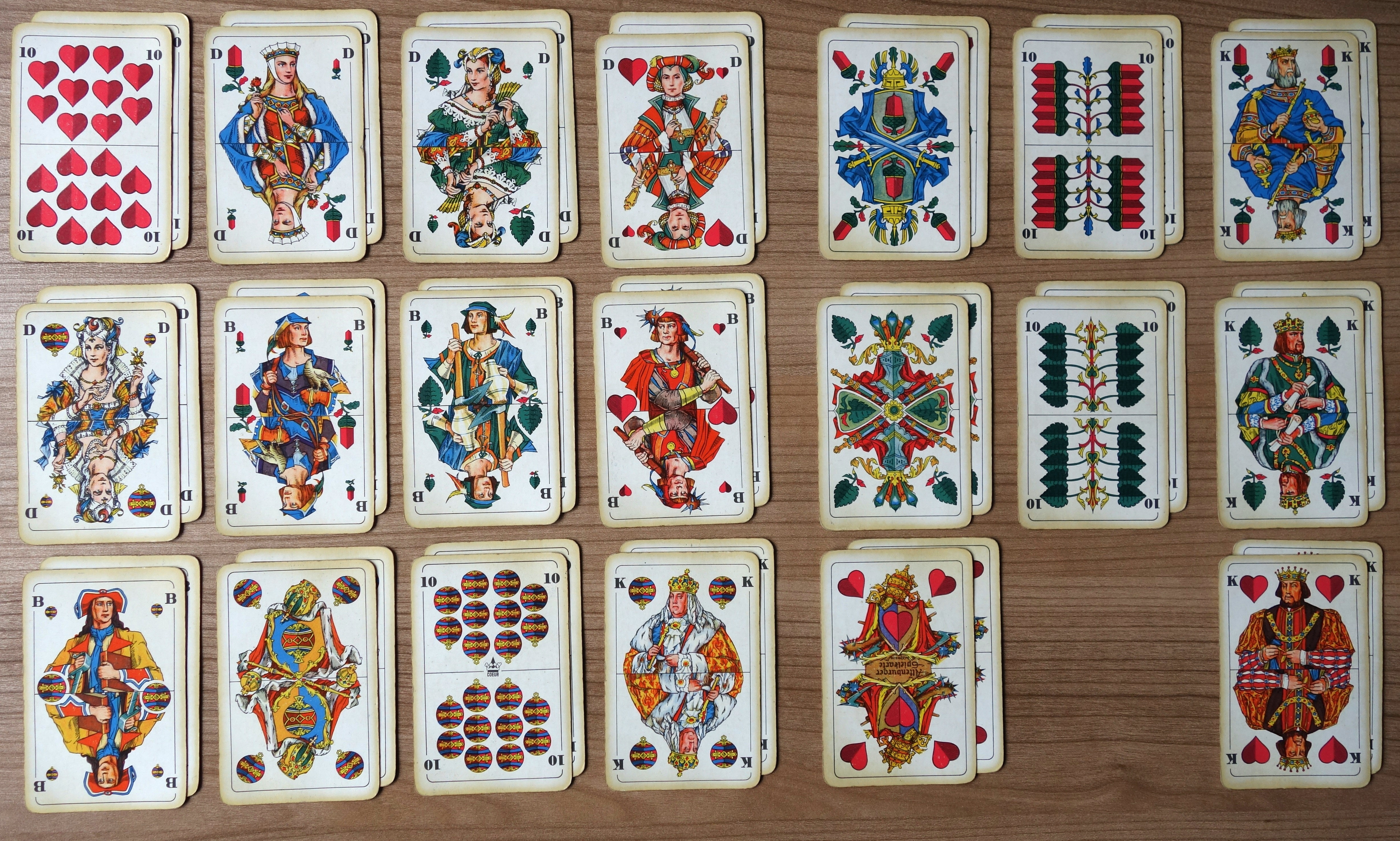
German-suited (Altenburg) Doppelkopf pack (without blanks)

Doppelkopf (German pronunciation: [ˈdɔpl̩kɔpf], lit. double-head), sometimes abbreviated to Doko, is a trick-taking card game for four players.

In Germany, Doppelkopf is nearly as popular as Skat, especially in Northern Germany and the Rhein-Main Region. Schafkopf, however, is still the preferred point-trick game in Bavaria. (Note: Indeed, it is the national game of Bavaria.) As with Skat and Bavarian Schafkopf there is a set of official rules, but numerous unofficial variants.

Although the German Doppelkopf Association (Deutscher Doppelkopf-Verband) has developed standard rules for tournaments, informal sessions are often played in many different variants, and players adopt their own house rules. Before playing with a new group of players, it is advisable to agree on a specific set of rules before the first game.

== History ==
=== Classic Schafkopf ===
Games of the Schafkopf group date to the 18th century or earlier, the oldest member of the family being known as Schafkopf or, nowadays, German Schafkopf to avoid confusion with its modern Bavarian descendant. A 1783 novel describes the scene after a wedding dinner as the dining tables were cleared away and replaced by games tables: "here stood an Ombre table, there a noble Schafkopf was played, over there a game of forfeits, soon everybody was busy playing when suddenly the sound of the strings announced the arrival of the dance band..." In 1796, we learn that students at Leipzig University liked to repair to disreputable bars to play Solo or Schafkopf for a couple of Dreiers. In 1803, it is described as "a cute little game [played] with chalk and collection bag pennies". and its rules are recorded for the first time by Paul Hammer. In 1853, they were reprinted by Von Alvensleben who describes 'Schaafkopf' as being very common, especially with the lower classes perhaps due to its ordinary name ("sheep's head"), but that it also went under the "more noble" names of Society (Societätsspiel), Conversation (Conversationsspiel) or Denunciation (Denunciationsspiel). (Note: These alternative names are not known to be recorded in the literature.) He hypothesises that the name comes from the practice of drawing the lines denoting points scored in the form of a stylised sheep's head. He goes on to describe in detail no fewer than nine variants of 'Schaafkopf', (Note: In addition to Wendish Schafkopf.) but states clearly that the original was a four-hand, point-trick, team game with 4 Unters as top trumps, known as Wenzels (pronounced "Ventsels") and a trump suit nominated by the bid winner. The game was normally played for beer.

=== Early Doppelkopf ===
Among Hammer's nine variants were three played with a double pack that appear to be an early form of Doppelkopf. These were all ace–ten games with the tens ranking low and were played by teams of two, in fixed partnerships, with bells as the trump suit. They differed as follows:

1. Four players, twelve Wenzels, 2 x 24 cards (Type G)
2. Six players, twelve Wenzels, 2 x 24 cards (Type H)
3. Eight players, sixteen Wenzels, 2 x 32 cards (Type I)

=== Wendish Schafkopf ===
Several post-war sources claim that Doppelkopf has its origins in a game called Wendish Schafkopf which, however, is first mentioned in the 1850s. This may stem from a misreading of von Alvensleben by Georgens & Gagette-Georgens (1882) who stated that the original form of Schafkopf was Wendish, but then describes another different game: Hammer's type A. The error is repeated by Alban von Hahn (1905 and 1909) and may have led to others deriving Doppelkopf from Wendish Schafkopf instead of German Schafkopf.

=== Merino ===
In 1861, a short description was published of a game, probably referring to Types G and H above, that appeared under the alternative name of Marino (sic) as well as Schafkopf. "Despite its common name" (Schafkopf) it was said to be very popular in many areas, especially in northern Germany." This game for four "or even six" players was often played with two German packs. Bells were permanent trumps along with the twelve matadors, known as Wenzels, namely two each of the O O U U U and U. The usual ace–ten scoring scheme was used. No rules of play are given. The name Merino appears occasionally other contemporary sources, for example, an 1870 newspaper remarks: "It is strikingly clear how the common man recently viewed the world from the acquiescence of several playing card manufacturers who have designed the highest trump in German Solo, Obsern and Merino – the Ober of Acorns – with a face resembling that of Napoleon III." (Note: And in an 1877 dictionary definition.)

=== Doppelschafkopf ===
In 1873 the name Doppelschaf(s)kopf appears for the first time in an Aichach newspaper which mentions a Doppelschafskopf Society (Doppelschafskopf-Gesellschaft).

In 1879 Anton records that the "usual Doppelschafkopf" is a four-hand partnership game "although more commonly played by three players, one of whom plays with a blind". Two packs of cards were used, the 7s and 8s being removed to leave 2 x 24, and there were 22 permanent trumps in the game: the Obers of Acorns and Leaves, the four Unters and the suit of Bells. This is the same format as Hammer's Type G (see above). If played by three, the dealer was designated the 'king' and played with a 'straw man' (Strohmann), an extra hand of cards laid on the table opposite the dealer and which was played open after the first trick.

The other two players were the 'folk'. Whist rules of play were followed. There were 240 points in cards and 121 were required to win. A team needed at least 61 points to avoid losing Schneider i.e. double. Each game or 'head' (Kopf) consisted of 4 lines (game points) and was worth typically 10, 20, 25 or more pfennigs. If teams tied on 120, the point was carried forward to the next hand.

If the two Acorn Obers came together in the same trick, there was often a bonus for the first one played since it won. The first team to 4 chalk up lines won. If four or five wanted to play in the same way as the three-hand game, the additional players sat out each time leaving three active players; however they won or lost along with the folk. As well as the three-hand game, variants for six and eight players were described; in the latter case, all the Obers and Unters were matadors as in the modern game.

In 1884 Doppelschafkopf was mentioned in a chess primer. During a chess trip to Ratzebüttel, (Note: Possibly Ritzebüttel, part of the coastal town of Cuxhaven.) the president of a ladies chess club declares that "our husbands play chess too badly; they are too prosaic and much prefer to sit at a beer table playing Doppelschafkopf."

In a set of 1890 rules, three players played with a 'blind' as before, but four played without the requirement for anyone to sit out. Other descriptions of Doppelschafkopf appear in the early 20th century, for example, in the 1911 Brockhaus.

=== Emergence of modern Doppelkopf ===
==== Name ====
In the 19th century the name Doppelkopf was sometimes used to refer to a French-suited double-ended playing card and sometimes to refer to winning a double game (a Doppel-Kopf or double head) in Doppelschafkopf. By the late 19th century it had become firmly attached to variants of Schafkopf played with two packs e.g. Brockhaus says in 1896 that "[German] Schafkopf may be played with one or two packs of 32 cards; in the latter case it is called Doppelkopf."

==== Early modern Doppelkopf ====
In 1927 an early version of modern Doppelkopf is described by Robert Hülsemann, who calls it an elaboration of the old German 3-4 player game of Schafkopf, which has almost died out. He says that Doppelkopf got its name because it is played with double the number of cards, the 7s and 8s being removed from two Skat packs to leave 2 x 24 cards. The game was also referred to here and there in north Germany as Juristenspiel ("Lawyer") probably because it was played in legal circles. French-suited packs are described and there were now eight matadors: Q♣ Q♠ Q♥ Q♦ J♣ J♠ J♥ J♦ along with the default trump suit of diamonds. It was played much as in Doppelschafkopf above, but there was now an extra penalty for losing the "Fox" – the trump Ace. Instead of lines (Striche) being used to keep score, winnings were paid in small stakes such as 5 or 10 pfennigs instead of one line. For the first time there were secret partnerships, the two players dealt the "Old Ones" (2 x Q♣) joining forces against the other two, but they were not allowed to announce their possession of these cards. A player with both either played a silent Solo, played a Suit Solo against the other three or called for a partner by going with the taker of the 1st or 5th tricks as desired.

In a 1931 account by Karl Thoenen further elaborations appear. "In many areas" two more trumps were added: the two red 10s, each known as the Tolle ("mad one"). These are now the commanding cards, but partnerships were still decided based on the two Q♣s. Players may opt to play with "strict" (Zwang) or "wild" (wild) rules. In the former a player with the Q♣ had to lead trumps; in the latter there was no such compulsion. Suit Solos were not common. Players anted e.g. a Mark to a common pot and the winners drew 5 pfennigs; 10 in the event of Schneider and 15 in the event of a Schwarz. If the team with the two Old Ones lost, their opponents won double. A trump Solo cost 20 pfennigs and was usually paid direct from player to player.

The bonus for taking the last trick with the J♣, Charlie Miller (Karlchen Müller), appears in Meister (1933) alongside another new feature, the sheep race (Hammelrennen), a contract in which everyone played for himself.

In 1951 it was referred to as a "central German card game" and in 1958 as "one of the most popular card games in Germany."

Although early 19th century Schafkopf played with double packs appears to have originated in Saxony and was played with German-suited cards, today Doppelkopf has become very much a north German and west German game played with French-suited cards. It bears traces of its origins, however, including the retention of Diamonds (the equivalent of Bells) as the trump suit. The major development has been the addition of contracts and bidding.

== Rules ==
Note: In the following section, the most common rules are described.

=== General principles ===
Doppelkopf is predominantly a team game with two players per team. As with Schafkopf, the pairing is not known from the start.

The card pack consists of either 48 or 40 cards:

- Eight Aces or deuces worth 11 points each
- Eight tens worth 10 points each
- Eight kings worth four points each
- Eight queens or Obers worth three points each
- Eight jacks or Unters worth two points each
- Eight nines worth zero points each (these may be dropped)

Each set of eight cards consists of two cards from each suit. Thus, each card exists twice in the pack (hence the name Doppelkopf), resulting in a total number of 240 points. In the ensuing description, the more common 48-card version is assumed. The rules for the 40-card variant are the same except that the nines are removed.

If French-suited cards are used, the suits are diamonds ♦, hearts ♥, spades ♠ and clubs ♣. If German-suited cards are used, the suits are bells, hearts , leaves and acorns. The ace is replaced by the deuce or Daus (A), the queen by the Ober (O), and the jack by the Unter (U).

In every game, there are two teams, the Re team and the Contra team. To win, Re normally has to achieve 121 points or more; Contra wins when Re fails to do so.

==== Preparation ====
Each player is dealt 12 cards (or 10 in the 'sharp' 40-card version). After the cards are dealt, the type of game or contract is determined. In non-tournament play, it is assumed that a 'normal game' will be played and any player desiring a different game simply says so. In tournament games, a stricter procedure is used to prevent players from gaining information about their opponents' hands.

The types of contract that can be played only differ in which cards are considered trumps. When a player declares a game other than the normal game, that player alone is Re and must play against the other three players who form Contra. These non-standard games are, therefore, called 'solo games'.

In the normal game, the players who hold the queens of clubs (Die Alten = "the old women" or "the elders") or Obers of acorns constitute Re, while the other two are Kontra. In these games, the actual teams are not known from the start. When a player has both queens of clubs or Obers of acorns, that player declares a Wedding (Hochzeit).

=== Playing ===
Forehand, the player to the left of the dealer, leads to the first trick and the others follow in clockwise order. Each player must follow suit, that is, play a card of the led suit. A player unable to follow may trump or discard. The player playing the highest trump, or the highest card in the led suit if no trumps are played, wins the trick and leads to the next. Since each card exists twice, there is the possibility of a tie; in that case, the first-played card wins the trick. For example, when the trick consists of 10♠ A♠ 9♠ A♠, the player who played the first ace of spades wins the trick.

During the first trick, each player may make announcements, which increases the value of the game.

After all the cards have been played, the card points taken in the tricks are counted and each player in the winning team gets the game points added to his or her score, while the losing players have that value deducted.

=== Contracts ===
==== Auction ====
There is then an auction during which players bid for a contract by making announcements. In Doppelkopf there is a single round of bidding starting with forehand.

Each player says either "Fine" (Gesund), if content to play a normal game, or "Hold" (Vorbehalt = "reservation", formerly Halt) if wishing to play a 'special' game such as a Solo. If one or more players have said "Hold", each, in turn, names the contract they wish to play. Whoever has the highest-ranking "Hold" wins the auction and plays the game bid. In the event of two players bidding the same contract, the first player in bidding order wins.

The special contracts, from lowest-ranking to highest-ranking, are:

1. Wedding (Hochzeit)
2. Free Solo (Lustsolo, various types)
3. Compulsory Solo (Pflichtsolo, various types)

==== Normal game ====
Normal game
Trumps (in decreasing order)
French cards ♥10 | ♣Q | ♠Q | ♥Q | ♦Q | ♣J | ♠J | ♥J | ♦J | ♦A | ♦10 | ♦K | ♦9
German cards 10 | O | O | O | O | U | U | U | U | A | 10 | K | 9
Non-trumps (in decreasing order per suit)
Clubs (acorns)	Spades (leaves)	Hearts (hearts)
♣A | ♣10 | ♣K | ♣9	♠A | ♠10 | ♠K | ♠9	♥A | ♥K | ♥9

The 10 of hearts (often called the Dulle or Tolle) is the highest trump in every normal game as well as any suit solo. Except for hearts solo, there are actually more trumps than non-trump cards. One noteworthy result of this rule is that there are only six non-trump cards left in hearts, making this suit more likely to be trumped in the first trick it is played. (Note: The normal game in a version suitable for children and beginners was released in 2019 under the name Doublehead Kids in cooperation with the German Doppelkopf Association.)

==== Wedding ====
A player who has both queens of clubs or Obers of acorns, usually declares a "Wedding" (Hochzeit). The 'suitor' will then form a partnership, the Re team, with the first other player to win a trick. Otherwise, the game is played like a normal game. If, however, the suitor makes the first three tricks, that player must play a diamond solo against the other players.

A player may choose not to announce a Wedding and instead play a silent Solo (stilles Solo). This is played like a normal diamond solo, except that the defenders do not know at the start they are playing against a Solo. Apart from this, the game is scored like a normal Solo (times three for soloist, normal for all others).

==== Solo contracts ====
Hearts solo
Trumps (in decreasing order)
French cards ♥10 | ♣Q | ♠Q | ♥Q | ♦Q | ♣J | ♠J | ♥J | ♦J | ♥A | ♥K | ♥9
German cards 10 | O | O | O | O | U | U | U | U | A | K | 9
Non-trumps (in decreasing order per suit)
Clubs (acorns)	Spades (leaves)	Diamond (bells)
♣A | ♣10 | ♣K | ♣9	♠A | ♠10 | ♠K | ♠9	♦A | ♦10 | ♦K | ♦9

A player can announce a solo game if they wish. These games change the status of trump cards; the player also must play against the other three players. They will get thrice game value-added (or subtracted) from their scoreboard in case of a win (or a loss).

The kinds of solo games are, according to the official rules:

- Jack Solo / Unter Solo (Bubensolo) with only jacks or Unters as trump cards;
- Queen Solo / Ober Solo (Damensolo) with only queens or Obers as trumps;
- Ace Solo (Fleischloser = "trumpless", lit. fleshless" or Knochenmann = "skeleton") where no trumps exist;
- Suit Solo (Farbensolo) which makes the announced suit along with jacks and queens/Unters and Obers trump cards. A "diamond solo", therefore, has the same trumps as in a normal game.

=== Bids ===
During play, a player may make announcements claiming that their team will succeed in achieving a specific goal. These announcements increase the game value regardless of whether they are fulfilled. If a team fails to accomplish the self-given goal, they automatically lose.

Apart from increasing the game value, the bids fulfill the role of clarifying which side the player who makes them belongs to.

The bids that are possible are:

- "Re" (pronounced "ray") or "Contra" (Kontra), announcing the name of the player's team and undertaking that their team will score more than 120 points. Note that this means that, in the case of an announced "Contra", the Contra team must now make 121 points instead of 120 to win the game, unless Re is also announced. Either of these announcements enables the other players to work out whether they are partnered with the announcer or not.

Each of the following announcements can only be made after Re or Contra. If, for example, Re was said and a Contra player wants to make an announcement, they must announce Contra. If Re was announced by one player and their partner wants to make an additional announcement, they have to identify themself as being on the Re team before being able to do so.

- "No 90" (Keine 90), often abbreviated to "No 9" (keine 9), meaning that the opponents will get less than 90 points
- "No 60" (Keine 60), or "No 6" (keine 6), announces the opposing team will not make 60 points
- "No 30" (Keine 30) / No 3 (keine 3)
- "Schwarz", meaning the opponents will not get a single trick, not even a trick worth zero points

Each announcement implies any previous announcements, for example, "no 60" implies "no 90" and "Re"/"Kontra", increasing the game-value by 4 (for the standard rules) points. Every bid may be countered by "Contra" or "Re" if the opponents think the goal will not be met. For example, if the Re Team announces "Re, no 60", a reply of "Contra" simply claims Contra will score 60 points.

Players must bid in time i.e. they must hold a minimum number of cards in their hands. In the official rules:

- A Re or Contra may be made with 11 cards left (that is, before playing one's second card; it does not require the announcement to be made before the first card of the second trick is played).
- For "No 90", 10 cards must be held.
- "No 60" (keine 60): 9 cards
- "No 30" (keine 30): 8 cards
- "Schwarz": 7 cards

A player that has, for example, announced "Re", but not "no 90", may not announce "no 60" with 9 cards left, because the implied "no 90" would not be legal.

A Contra/Re in response to a bid from the opposing team may be made until one-trick later, e.g. a player can say "Contra" in response to "Re/no 90" as long as they hold nine cards, regardless of when "Re" and "no 90" was announced.

In a Wedding, if the partner is found with the second (third) trick, all players need to hold one card (two cards) fewer than in a normal game in order to make their announcements. A player may not make an announcement before a partner has been found.

==== Positive and negative announcements ====
The official rules distinguish between Ansagen and Absagen, positive and negative announcements. The positive announcements are those claiming the win i.e. "Re" or "Contra". The negative announcements (an Absage is a rejection) are those claiming that the opposition are not going to achieve certain scores e.g. "No 90" (keine 90) or "Schwarz" i.e. "no tricks".

=== Scoring ===
After all cards are played, each team counts the points of their tricks (since the total sum of points always is 240, in theory only one team has to count; letting both parties count serves as verification). The game value is calculated as follows:

- 1 point base value ("won the game")
- +1 if the winning team is Kontra ("gegen die Alten", against the elders) unless a solo is played
- +2 for an announcement of Re
- +2 for an announcement of Kontra
- +1 if the losing team has less than 90 points
- +1 if No 90 was announced
- +1 if the winning team won with more than 120 points against an announcement of No 90
- +1 if the losing team has less than 60 points
- +1 if No 60 was announced
- +1 if the winning team won with at least 90 points against an announcement of No 60
- +1 if the losing team has less than 30 points
- +1 if No 30 was announced
- +1 if the winning team won with at least 60 points against an announcement of No 30
- +1 if the winning team made all tricks
- +1 if Schwarz was announced
- +1 if the winning team won with at least 30 points against an announcement of Schwarz

==== Extra score points ====
Unless a solo is played, the following additional score points can be made during the game, which affects the game value. There are no extra points in a solo game, not even in a silent solo (when a Wedding is not announced).

===== Catching the fox =====
If a team's ace of diamonds, known as the fox (Fuchs), is won by the opposing team, the opposing team scores an extra point.

===== Doppelkopf =====
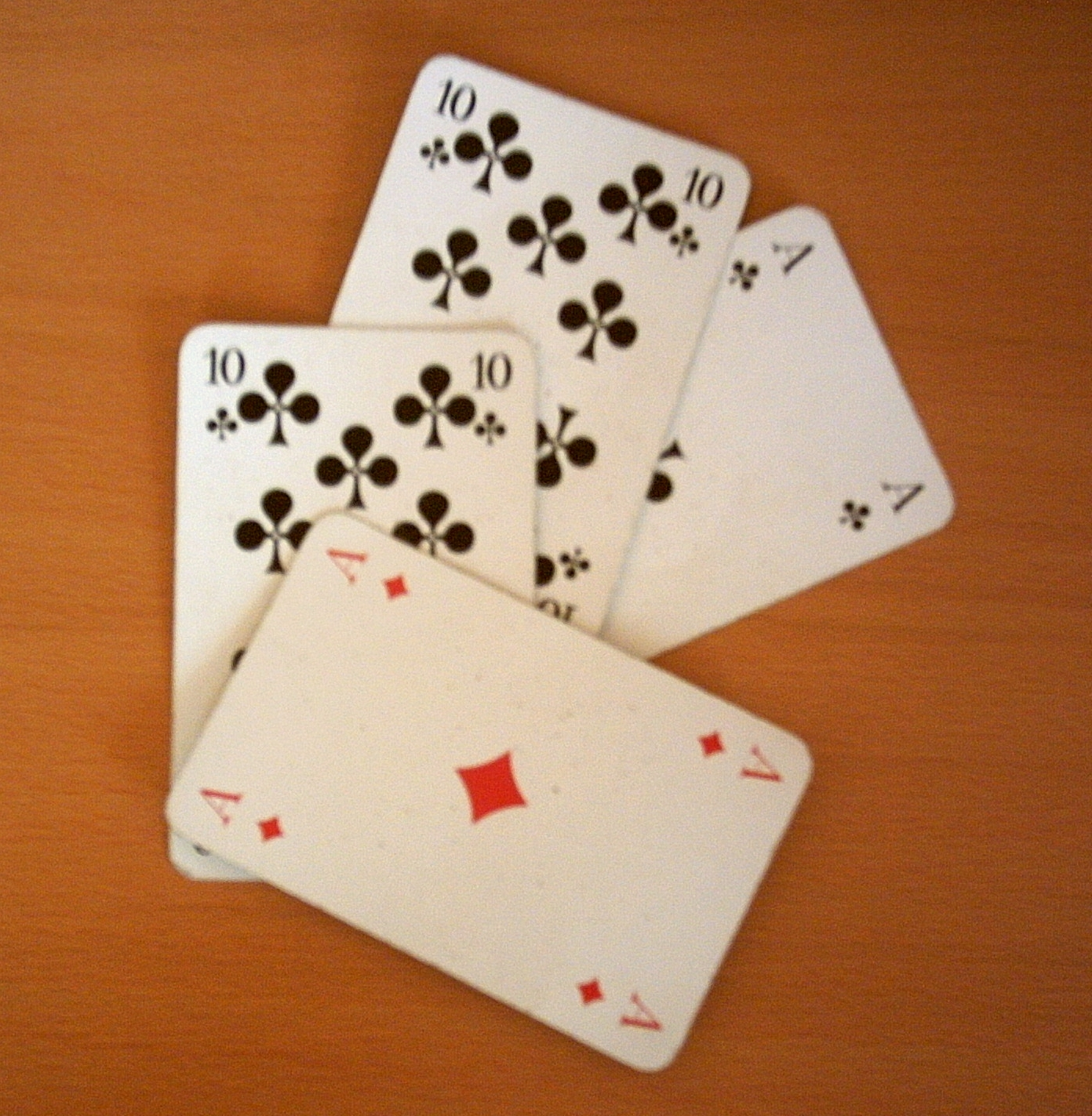
A "Doppelkopf" trick, two tens and two aces

A trick containing 40 or more points (four Volle, i.e. tens and aces) scores an extra point for the team that collected the trick.

===== Charlie Miller =====
If a team's jack of clubs, dubbed "Charlie Miller" (Karlchen Müller) or just "Charlie" (Karlchen), wins the last trick, the team scores an extra point.

==== Score of each player ====
The game value is added to the score of each player on the winning team and subtracted for the losing team. If the game was a solo game, the soloist gets thrice the game value added or subtracted. This rule ensures the total sum of points won/lost in a round is always zero.

==== Examples ====
The following examples show the scoring as stated in the official rules.

- No bids were made, Re wins with 131 points.
  - Game was won: +1
  - Both Re players get +1, both Kontra -1.
- Kontra, no 60 was announced, Kontra gets 183 points.
  - Game was won: +1
  - Won against the elders: +1
  - Kontra was announced: +2
  - Losing team has less than 90 points: +1
  - No 90 was announced: +1
  - Losing team has less than 60 points: +1
  - No 60 was announced: +1
  - Both Kontra players get +8, both Re -8.
- Re, no 60 was announced, Kontra team said Kontra. Kontra gets 60 points and therefore wins.
  - Game was won: +1
  - Won against the elders: +1
  - Re was announced: +2
  - Kontra was announced: +2
  - No 90 was announced: +1
  - No 60 was announced: +1
  - Both Kontra players get +8, both Re -8.
- Re, no 60 was announced, Kontra team said Kontra. Kontra gets 90 points.
  - In addition to the previous example, Kontra got 90+ points against the No 60 announcement: +1
  - Both Kontra-players get +9, both Re -9.
- A Soloist wins without announcements with 153 points.
  - Game was won: +1
  - Losing team has less than 90 points: +1
  - Soloist gets +6, all others -2.
- Soloist announces Re, keine 90 but only manages to get 87 points for himself.
  - Game was won: +1
  - Re was announced: +2
  - No 90 was announced: +1
  - Kontra got 120+ points against Re's No 90 announcement: +1
  - Losing soloist has less than 90 points: +1
  - Soloist gets -18, all others +6.

== Tactics ==
Suggested tactics shown here come from the Pagat website.

=== Leads ===
The "first of equal cards wins" rule makes it important to lead one's ace of a non-trump suit before an opponent can lead theirs, as the second round is almost certain to be trumped - there are only six cards in a suit (four in hearts). It is recommended to avoid leading the second round of hearts, because of the danger of giving a ruff and discard to the opponents, since there are only four non-trump cards in the suit.

Therefore, if leading at the start, one would normally lead:

- a single black ace (shortest suit first with both club and spade single aces);
- a single ace of hearts;
- an ace from a pair.

After this, players should try to give the lead to their partner:

- If leading on the Re side, players would lead a trump to their partner's queen of clubs.
- If on the Kontra side players may lead a side suit. However, if their partner has said Kontra players should lead a trump as they should have at least one 10 of hearts.

=== Trumping ===
If one is trumping, and there is a possibility of being overtrumped, it is key to try trump, at least, a jack so that the fourth player cannot win with a fox or 10 of trumps. Similarly, if trumps are led then if one is the last player of the team to play the trick, with one or both opponents playing after, play a jack or higher if no high card has been played so far.

=== Announcements ===
Players must announce Re or Kontra if things seem to be going well, not only to increase the score for the game but also so that they can announce "no 90" if things continue to go well.

Announcing Re or Kontra earlier than when one needs to, for example, on the first play rather than the second, indicates possession of additional strength (similar conceptually to jump bidding in Contract Bridge).

If on the opening lead the fourth player says Re or Kontra before second-hand plays, this indicates that they are going to trump the lead and want their partner to put a valuable card on it.

==== Wedding announcements ====
It is generally correct to announce a Wedding and rarely profitable to go solo.

It is desirable to partner with Wedding as one's partner normally has at least 2 high trumps.

When leading against a Wedding, players might lead a 10 of hearts to win the trick; otherwise, they could lead an ace in their shortest suit.

=== Solo games ===
When considering a solo, the initial lead is a big advantage. Trumping solos require a much stronger hand than expected, and these hands would also play well in a normal game. For an ace solo, a five-card suit to A A 10 will normally capture over 60 points. For a queen or jack solo, four trumps are sufficient with a reasonable number of aces.

See also note on solo games in tournament play below.

=== 90/60/30 announcements ===
Announcing 90, 60 or 30 changes the target. A player who does so risks losing the whole game for the chance of one extra point.

=== Tournament Play ===
It is highly likely that a player will not get a hand warranting a solo bid during the session. A compulsory solo, particularly towards the end, should almost always have Kontra said if the declarer does not say Re to increase the game value when the soloist loses.

== Variants ==
=== Poverty ===
A player with three or fewer trumps can say "Hold" and announce "I'm strapped" (Armut, lit.: "poverty"). If no one has a higher special, the 'pauper' places all those trumps face down on the table. A player who wishes to partner (preference being given clockwise, starting from the pauper - if nobody wishes to partner then the hand is redealt by the same dealer) has the right to take the trumps (without seeing them first) and discard any three cards, which are returned to the pauper. The returned cards may contain trumps and may include cards originally passed.

=== Without nines ===
Many groups remove the nines so that there are 40 cards left. This way, there are no more dummy cards and the balance between trumps and non-trumps is shifted even more towards trumps. This is referred to as Sharp Doppelkopf (scharfer Doppelkopf), "Doppelkopf without nines" (ohne Neunen) or "Doppelkopf without blanks" (ohne Luschen).

=== Wedding ===
Some variants allow the Wedding (Hochzeit) player to announce which kind of trick must be taken, i.e. the first trump trick or the first non-trump trick. A trick is considered a non-trump trick if the first card played in the trick is a non-trump card, even if the trick is ultimately won by another player trumping. Otherwise, the trick is a trump trick. Similar to a Wedding in the tournament rules, if each of the first three tricks does not meet the called criteria or is won by the Wedding player, the Wedding player must play a diamond solo.

=== Dullen ===
It may be agreed that - as the only exception - the second 10 of hearts is considered higher than the first if both are played in the same trick. In some variants, this is true for all but the last trick, where the first 10 of hearts is considered higher. Playing this variant makes the game less predictable because some conventions (such as playing a 10 of hearts in the first trick by a Re player, or to marry a wedding player) cannot be used anymore.

=== Forced announcement ===
If a player collects 30 points or more in the first trick (not counting the tricks needed to determine the partners after a wedding has been announced), they have to announce either Re or Kontra. This is a "forced announcement" (Pflichtansage). This variation is often played in games "without nines".

Some players even insist that a further announcement (i.e. 90) be made if the announcement in question has been made already. This rule is popular among recreational players in order to render the game more dynamic.

=== Catching a fox in the final trick ===
Losing an Ace of Diamonds to the opposing team in the last trick of the game may lead to two extra points (instead of one) counted against the team losing the fox.

=== Piglets ===
When one player has both foxes (aces of diamonds) on their hand, they announce "piglets" (Schweinchen). That means, that these cards become the highest trumps in play, outranking the Dullen (tens of hearts) and Alten (queens of clubs). It may be played that a piglet forces the player to an announcement of Kontra or Re. Other variants include the announcement at any point during the game, often breaking the opposing team's bid or the possibility of 'super piglets', if one holds both nines of diamonds. In some variants, only the first played fox becomes a piglet at the top of the trump suit while the second one still ranks low.

=== Super piglets ===
Only when piglets is announced does 'super piglets' become possible. When one player has announced piglets and a player has both nines of diamonds on their hand, the player with the nines of diamonds may announce super piglets. That means, those nines of diamonds become the highest trumps in play, outranking the piglets, the Dullen and Alten.

=== Lost Charlie ===
As a variant, a jack of clubs may be also scored if a team loses it to the opposing team in the last trick. If a player loses their jack of clubs to their partner, no point is counted. Many groups play "Lizzie Miller" (Lieschen Müller or Karola Müller or Karlchen Killer): only if the queen of diamonds catches the opponent's jack of clubs in the last trick one point is scored. A Charlie lost to another higher trump is not scored.

=== Five nines ===
Some groups of players use a rule that a player holding five or more nines (Fünf Neuner) may, before the bidding, reveal their hand, throw their cards in (schmeißen) and demand a re-deal. Some groups that follow this rule also use a similar rule for hands with five or more kings.

=== Half a chicken ===
Under this house rule, a player may announce "half a chicken" upon being dealt both tens of diamonds. This bid does nothing - but a gentleman should announce it regardless.

== Tournament play ==
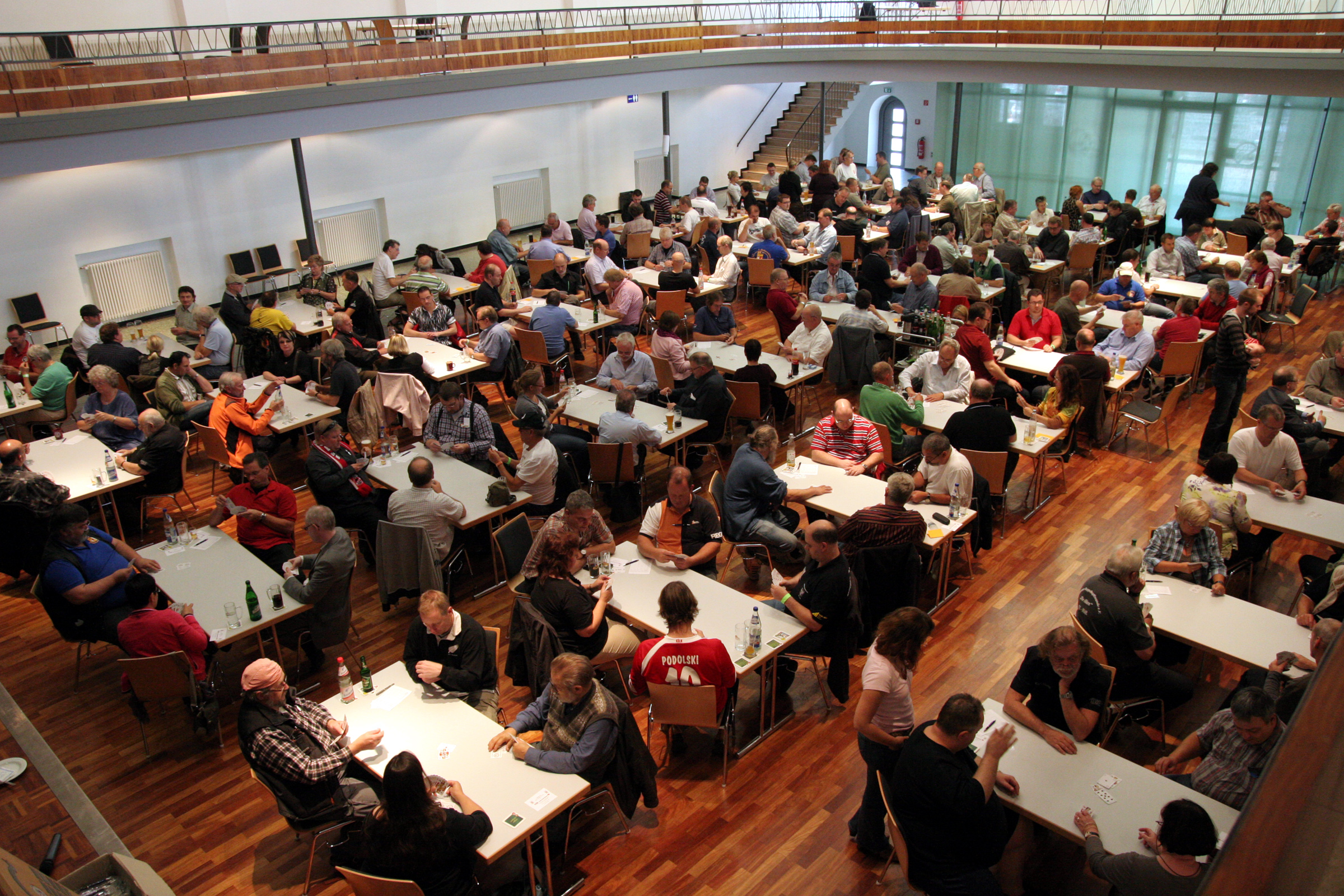
Doppelkopf tournament under way

Tournaments are played over a series of sessions, each of 24 deals. Each session having 20 normal hands plus four compulsory solos (or 25 hands with five solos for five players at a table).

=== Compulsory solos ===
Each player must bid one compulsory solo during the session. He/she may bid other free solos thereafter if desired. The first solo each player bids is a compulsory solo. The soloist always leads to the first trick in a compulsory solo.

Following the hand, the same dealer deals again.

A compulsory solo ranks above a free solo in the bidding; if more than one player wants to play a compulsory solo, the bidding order decides.

=== Failure to bid a solo ===
If a player fails to bid a solo by the end of a session, an additional hand is dealt on which they must bid a solo regardless (vorführen (showing up)).

== Conventions ==
=== Essen system ===
The Essen system is a system of conventions used in Doppelkopf in accordance with the rules of the German Doppelkopf Association.

== See also ==
- Sheepshead (game)
- Skat
- Ombre

== Literature ==
- Klinke, Stabsarzt Karl (1941). Doppelkopf: das Spiel der Soldaten und aller Kartenfreunde. Reprint by Horst Klein.
- Anton, Friedrich (1889). Encyclopädie der Spiele, 5th edn. Leipzig: Otto Wigand.
- Brockhaus, F. A. (1896). Brockhaus' Konversations-Lexikon. 14th fully revised edn. Vol. 14 (Rüdesheim–Soccus). Berlin, Leipzig and Vienna: Brockhaus.
- Brockhaus J. A. (1911). Brockhaus' Kleines Konversations-Lexikon, 5th edn., Vol. 2. Leipzig.
- Bruckmann, Karl (1811). Karl Bruckmann oder William Sterne, Findling des Harzgebirges und Bewohner einer einsamen Insel der Südsee. Vol. 2. Zittau and Leipzig: J.D. Schöps.
- Georgens, Jan Daniels and Jeanne Marie von Gagette-Georgens (1882). Spiel und Sport. Leipzig & Berlin: Otto Spamer.
- Hammer, Paul (1803). Taschenbuch der Kartenspiele. Leipzig: Weygand.
- Hirzel, Dr. Heinrich (1861). Das Hauslexikon. Vol. 5. Leipzig: Breitkopf & Härtel.
- Hülsemann, Robert (1927). Das Buch der Spiele: für Familie und Gesellschaft. 1st edn. Leipzig: Hesse & Becker.
- McLeod, John (1978). "Rules of Games: No. 8. Schafkopf" in The Journal of the Playing-Card Society, Vol. VII, No. 2. pp. 38–47. ISSN 0305-2133.
- Meister, Friedrich (1933). Rommee und Doppelkopf: Anleitung und Regeln. Hachmeister & Thal. 24 pp.
- Minckwitz, J. (1884). Das ABC des Schachspiels. Leipzig: Von Veit.
- Müller, Karl Friedrich (1951), Beiträge zur Sprachwissenschaft und Volkskunde: Festschrift für Ernst Ochs zum 60 Geburtstag. M. Schauenburg.
- Thoenen, Karl (1931). Skat, Tarock, Bridge, Whist, Rommé, Sechsundsechszig, Doppelkopf und andere Kartenspiele. 5th expanded edn. Dresden: Rudolph.
- Trumpf, Peter (1951). Spielkarten und Kartenspiele. Keyser. 187 pp.
- Ulmann, S. (1890). Das Buch der Familienspiele. A. Hartleben, Vienna, Munich and Pest.
- von Alvensleben, Ludwig (1853). Encyclopädie der Spiele. Leipzig: Otto Wigand.
- Weber, Ferdinand Adolf (1877). Erklärendes Handbuch der Fremdwörter: welche in der deutschen Schrift- und Umgangssprache gebräuchlich sind. 14th revised edn. Leipzig: Bernhard Tauchnitz.
