= Boon (game) =

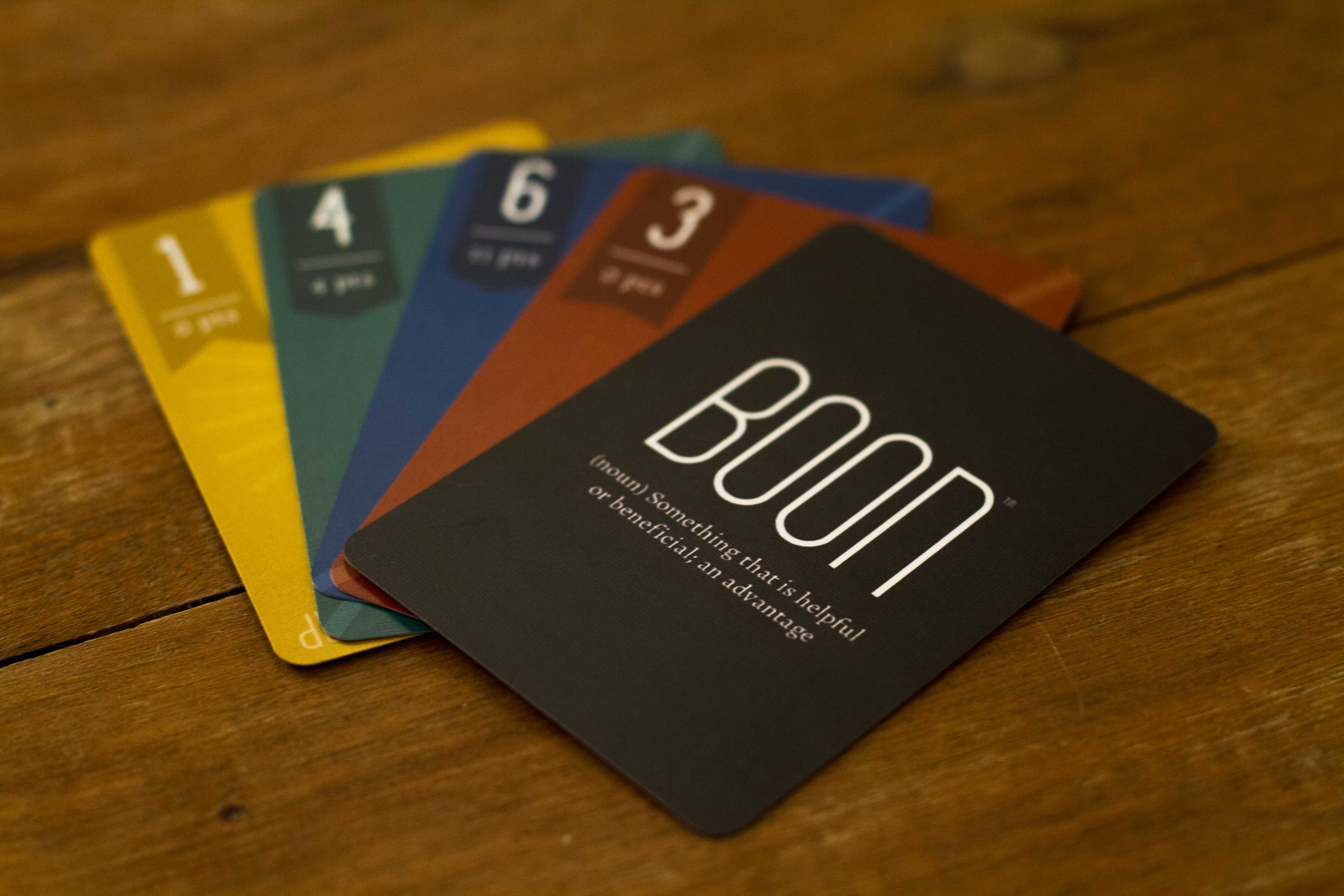
- Origin: derived from the card game Sheepshead (game)
- Type: trick-taking
- Players: 3-4
- Skills: Card counting, Tactics
- Age range: 12+
- Cards: 32 gameplay cards
- Deck: specialized version of the Piquet deck
- Play: Clockwise
- Playing time: about 3 minutes per hand
- Chance: Low–Moderate

Related games
- Skat (card game), Schafkopf, Doppelkopf, Sheepshead (game)

Boon is a trick-taking card game, based on the German card game Sheepshead. It was released in 2015. Though the rules of Boon are analogous to those in the game Sheepshead, Boon uses a specialized deck which corresponds directly to the rules of the game. This is different than Sheepshead, which is played with 32 cards from the Standard 52-card deck. Boon can be played with three or four players.

== See also ==
- Sheepshead
- Skat
- Doppelkopf
- Ombre
