= Officers' Schafkopf =

Two-player Bavarian card game

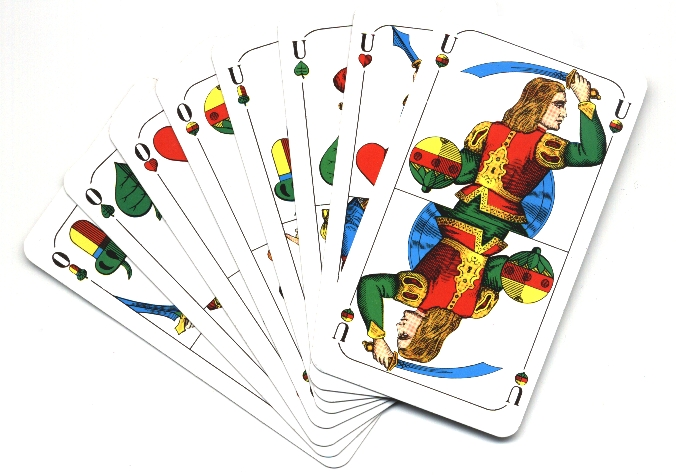
- The top trumps in Officers' Schafkopf
- Origin: Germany
- Type: Point-trick
- Players: 2
- Cards: 32
- Deck: Bavarian-pattern pack
- Rank (high→low): see text
- Play: Alternate
- Playing time: 15 minutes/hand

Related games
- Schafkopf

Officers' Schafkopf (German: Offiziersschafkopf) is a German point-trick card game for two players which is based on the rules of Schafkopf. The game is a good way to learn the trumps and suits for normal Schafkopf and to understand what cards one is allowed to play. It is similar in concept to Officers' Skat.

== Names ==
The game goes under a variety of other names including Open Schafkopf (Aufgelegter Schafkopf or Aafglegta Schafkopf), Two-Hand Schafkopf (Zweier Schafkopf or Schafkopf zu zweit), Two-Hand Wendish Schafkopf (Wendischer Schafkopf zu zweit), Farmer's Schafkopf (Bauernschafkopf), Robbers' Schafkopf (Räuber-Schafkopf), Officers' Regalia (Offiziersschmuck) or Ölkopf ("Oil Head").

== History ==
The first recorded mention of a two-handed Schafkopf is by Skat inventor, Johann Friedrich Ludwig Hempel (1773–1849), in 1835 in Pierer's Universal-Lexikon where it is called "Open Schafkopf". Each player received 8 cards in 2 packets and after each packet 4 cards were laid on the table, face up. It appears to be based on German Schafkopf in which Bells were usually permanent trumps and there could be 4, 6 or 8 Wenzels (Obers and Unters as permanent top trumps).

== Overview ==
Officers' Schafkopf tends to be preferred over Officers' Skat in areas where Schafkopf is more popular than Skat. Although there are similarities in concept, Officers' Schafkopf differs in the number of trumps, the bidding, the scoring and culturally in terms of the cards used and the region it is played in.

== Cards ==
Card ranking in a Heart Solo
Trumps
O O O O U U U U A 10 K 9 8 7
Suits
Acorns (Eichel)	Leaves (Gras)	Bells (Schellen)
A 10 K 9 8 7	A 10 K 9 8 7	A 10 K 9 8 7

Officers' Schafkopf is usually played with 32 Bavarian-pattern cards from a Schafkopf pack, the Sixes being removed. In a Solo contract, there are eight Wenzels or top trumps – the 4 Obers and the 4 Unters – in addition to the named trump suit. In a Wenz, only the Unters are trumps.

The deuce is usually called the sow in Bavaria, but is often referred to as the ace; its card symbol is either A, D or blank.

Card values follow the normal ace–ten game system:

Card	Sow/ deuce	Ten	King	Ober	Unter	Nine
Symbol	A / D	10	K	O	U	9–7
Points	11	10	4	3	2	0

== Rules ==
The following rules are based on Merschbacher:

=== Deal ===
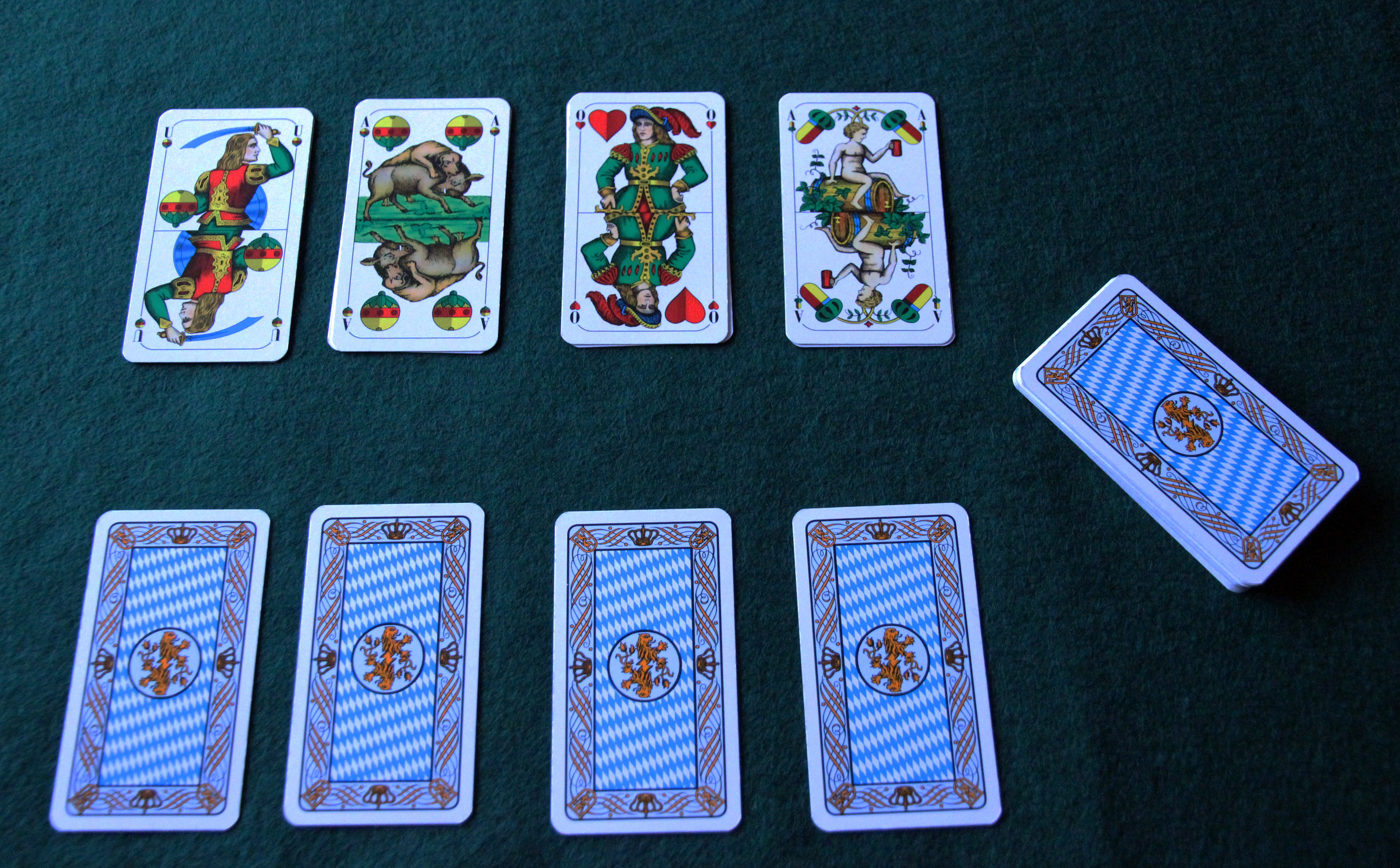
The point at which forehand announces a game

Dealer deals a row of 4 cards, face down, to each player, then a row of 4 cards, face up, to forehand, (i.e. the non-dealer). Forehand now announces a game - which must be either a Suit Solo or Wenz. Next the dealer deals 4 upcards to himself and may double the game value by saying e.g. Stoß or Spritze.

Merschbacher then gives two options for completing the deal:

1. The remaining sixteen cards are dealt to form another row of four cards, face down, for each player, and the remaining cards face up again on top of them. So each player now has eight cards, face down, in two rows of four, and eight cards, face up, on top of them.
2. The players are dealt eight cards each which they pick up as a hand.

=== Play ===
Forehand leads to the first trick by playing one of his upcards. Players must follow suit if they can; otherwise they are free to trump or discard. As an upcard is played, the one beneath it is turned and becomes available. This is done after the trick has been played. The winner of a trick leads to the next.

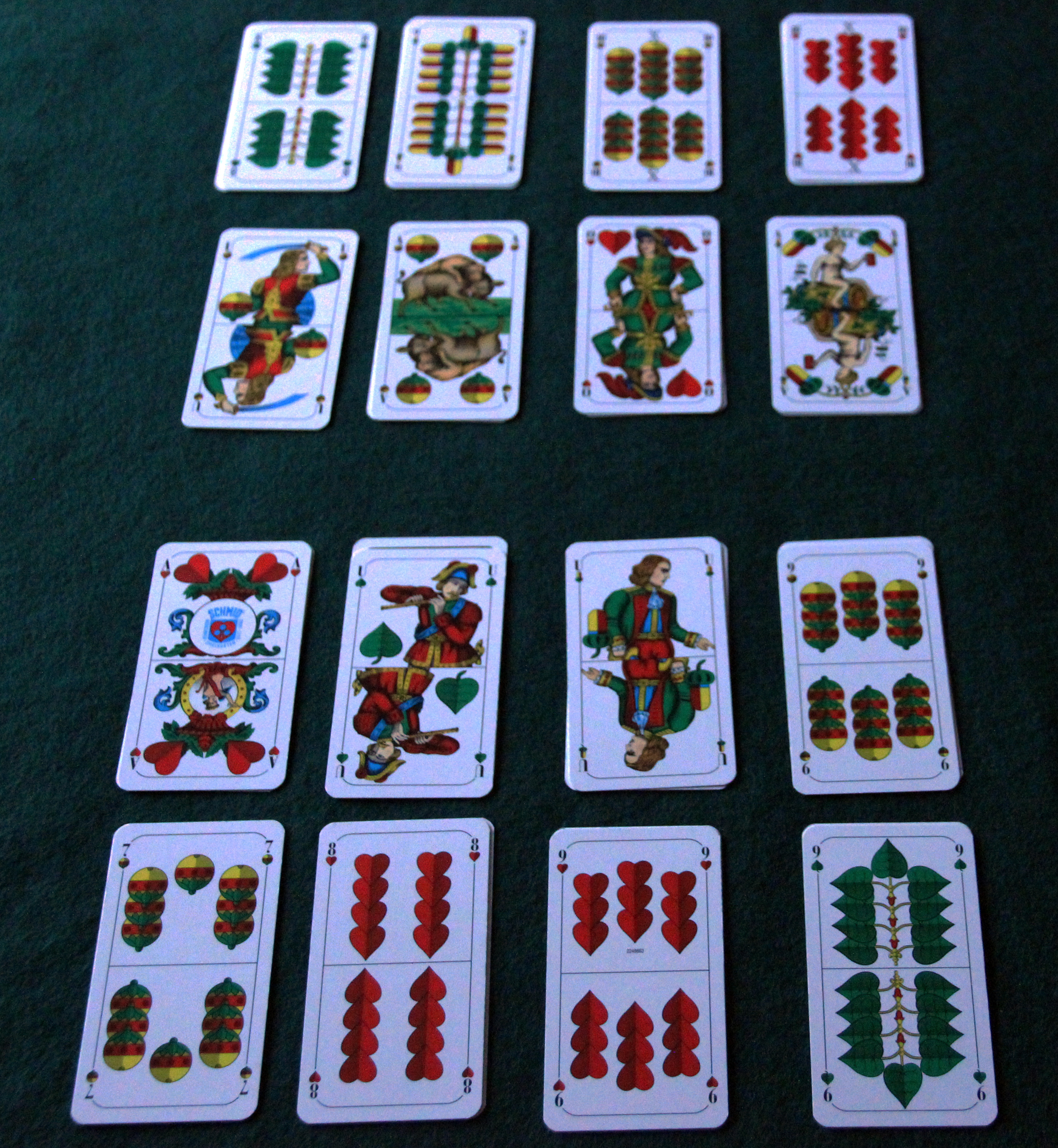
A starting position in Officers' Schafkopf (deal option 1)

=== Contracts ===
There are Wenz and Suit Solo contracts. The Suit Solo contracts are as per Schafkopf: Acorn Solo, Leaf Solo, Heart Solo and Bell Solo. (See the Schafkopf article for explanation.) In a Wenz contract, only the Unters are trumps; the Obers revert to the original suit, and are instead ranked in the A-10-K-O-9-8-7 order.

=== Scoring ===
Merschbacher does not cover scoring in his rules. Danyliuk uses the following system: before the game, an agreed sum (e.g. 10pf) is paid by each player into the pot. At the end of the deal, card points are totted up. If the declarer (the one who announced the game contract) scores 61 or more, he has won. His opponent only needs 60 to win. A simple win earns 1pf, a Schneider (loser scores less than 30 points but more than nothing) earns double and a Schwarz (loser takes no tricks) earns treble.

== Variants ==
Lembke describes Two-Hand Schafkopf in which each player receives two rows each of four downcards and four upcards, with the same trumps as the normal game (Rufspiel or Sauspiel) in Schafkopf i.e., all Obers, Unters and Hearts, (Note: This mode is also described by Wiesegger (2021) as "Herz Solo", the only contract.) but also suggests variants with different trumps as follows:

1. Unters and Bells (= Bell Wenz)
2. Announced trumps - after the first 4 upcards are dealt to forehand, he announces the trump suit (= Suit Solo)
3. Unters only (= Wenz)

== Literature ==
- Danyliuk, Rita (2017). 1 x 1 der Kartenspiele. Hanover: Humboldt. ISBN 978-3-86910-367-9
- Hempel, Johann Friedrich Ludwig (1835). "Schafkopf (Spielk.)" in Universal-Lexikon oder vollständiges encyclopädisches Wörterbuch, 18th volume, Altenberg (S-Schlüpfrig) ed. by H.A. Pierer. Altenburg: Literatur-Comptoir.
- Lembke, Robert [1975]. "Schafkopf zu zweit" in Das große Haus- und Familienbuch der Spiele. Cologne: Lingen. p. 219.
- Merschbacher, Adam (2009). Schafkopf: Das anspruchsvolle Kartenspiel, 2nd edn. PLIZ, Munich. ISBN 978-3-9812931-0-4
- Wiesegger, Joseph (2007–2021). Schafkopf: Ein Versuch, Wissen zu sammeln.
