= Niederhochstadt =

- Ortsteil of Hochstadt
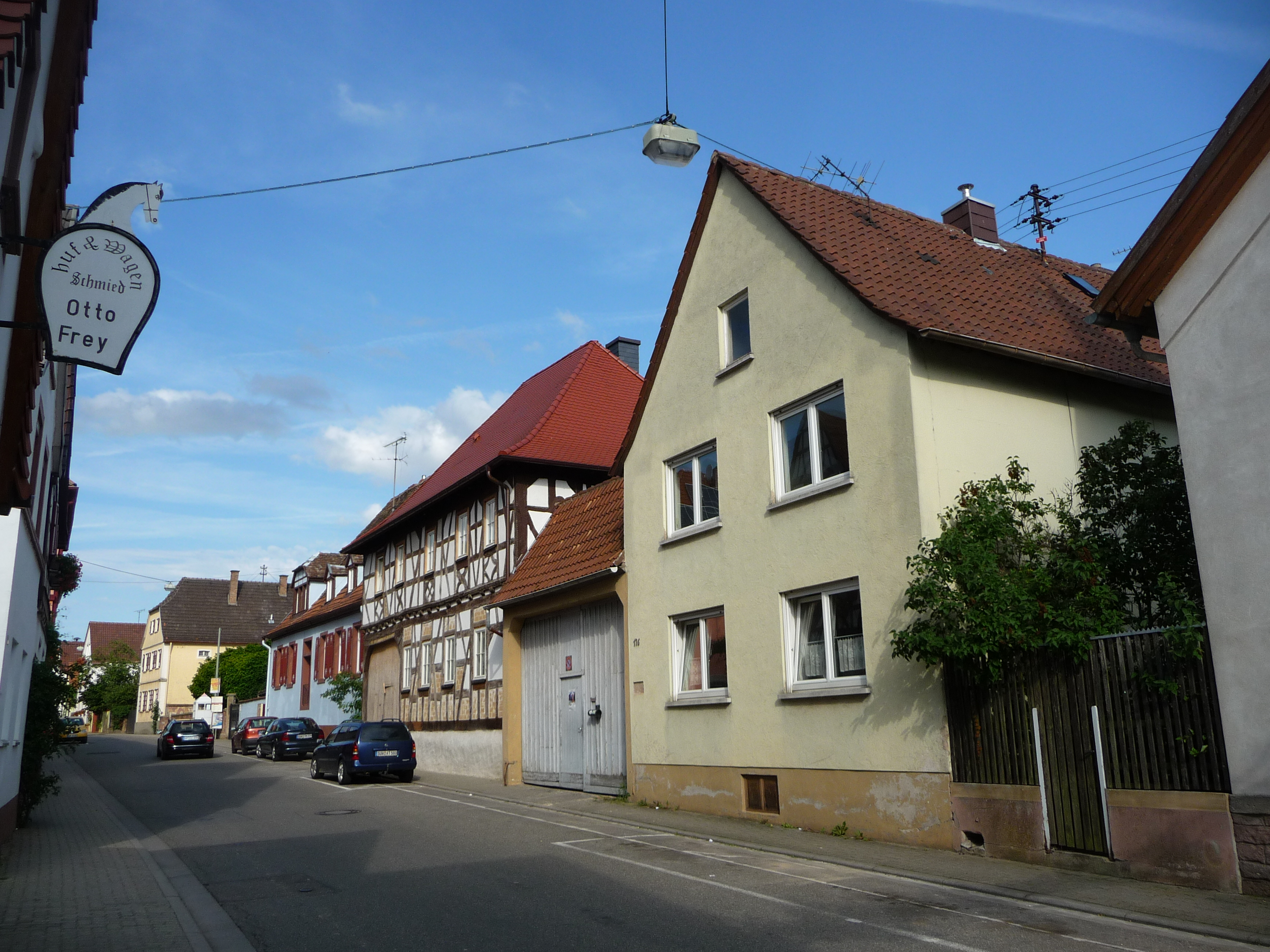
- Road in Niederhochstadt

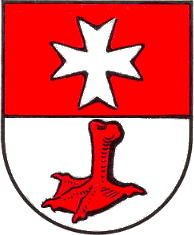
- Coat of arms
- Interactive map of Niederhochstadt
- Location within Germany Location within Rhineland-Palatinate
- Coordinates: 49°14′30″N 8°13′10″E
- Country: Germany
- State: Rhineland-Palatinate
- District: Südliche Weinstraße
- Municipality: Hochstadt
- Elevation: 135 m (443 ft)
- Time zone: UTC+01:00 (CET)
  - Summer (DST): UTC+02:00 (CEST)
- Postal codes: 76879
- Dialling codes: 06347

Niederhochstadt is the larger of two villages in the municipality of Hochstadt in Rhineland-Palatinate, Germany. Until 1969 it was independent.

== Location ==
Niederhochstadt forms the eastern part of the municipality and has meanwhile grown into one built-up area together with its neighbouring village of Oberhochstadt, so that there is no longer any open land between them. To Niederhochstadt belong the streets of Friedhofstraße, Großgasse, the eastern end of the high street (Hauptstraße). The stream of Hainbach grazes the northern edge of the urban area. In the south, the parish extends to a hill spur of the Bellheim Forest.

== Personalities ==
- Henry of Lustadt, Edelknecht, acquired an estate outside the village in 1494 enfeoffed to him by Count Eberhard of Württemberg-Mömpelgard
- Valentin Pressler, ancestor of Elvis Presley, lived here until his emigration in 1709
- Sara Mayer (1800–1867), born here, married Bernhard Roos in 1815

== Culture ==
Niederhochstadt is home to an unusual descendant of the traditional card game of German Schafkopf, known as Alter Schoofkopp.
