= Sheepshead (card game) =

American Card Game

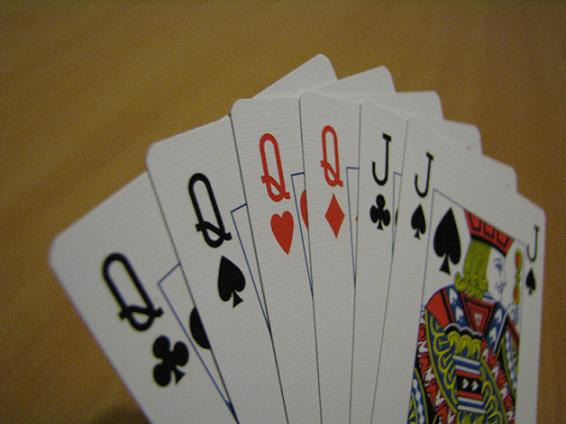
- Sheepshead's perfect "Grandma hand"
- Type: trick-taking
- Players: 2–8, usually 5
- Skills: Card counting, Tactics
- Cards: 32
- Deck: Piquet
- Rank (high→low): Trump: Q♣ Q♠ Q♥ Q♦ J♣ J♠ J♥ J♦ A♦ 10♦ K♦ 9♦ 8♦ 7♦ Fail: A 10 K 9 8 7
- Play: Clockwise
- Playing time: about 3 minutes per hand
- Chance: Low–Moderate

Related games
- Doppelkopf, Bavarian Schafkopf, German Schafkopf, Skat

Sheepshead is an American trick-taking card game. It is derived from Bavaria's national card game, Schafkopf (lit. 'sheep's head'), hence it is sometimes called American Schafkopf.

One of Sheepshead's distinguishing features, compared to other popular trick-taking card games like Bridge, Hearts, Spades, or Euchre, is a hidden-partnership structure. The picker's partner is determined at the beginning of each game, but their identity is unknown to the picker and the defenders. This creates an element of asymmetric information, as players must deduce the partner's identity through gameplay as in a Social deduction game. Each game, a "picker" and a "partner" compete against the other three players, and at the beginning of the game, only the partner knows their identity as the partner. Variants exist, some allowing for two to eight players; many slang terms are used with the game.

Sheepshead is most commonly played in Wisconsin, where it is sometimes called the "unofficial" state card game. In 1983, it was declared the official card game of the city of Milwaukee. It is also common among German counties in Southern Indiana, which has large German-American populations, and on the Internet.

Numerous tournaments are held throughout Wisconsin during the year, with the largest tournament being the "Nationals", held annually in the Wisconsin Dells during a weekend in September, October or November, and mini-tournaments held hourly throughout German Fest in Milwaukee during the last weekend of each July. National 3-Hand Sheepshead Tournament has been held annually in Wisconsin since 1970 in the month of March. 48-hand sessions are held at locations around the state, offering players an opportunity to play in as many of the 100 plus sessions as they wish.

== Etymology ==
Schafkopf literally means 'sheep's head' and may refer to the practice going back over a century of recording the score by drawing a stylised head of a sheep with nine lines. However, some sources argue that the term was probably derived and translated incorrectly from Middle High German and referred to playing cards on a barrel head (from kopf, meaning head, and Schaff, meaning a barrel).

== Rules ==
=== Preparation ===
Sheepshead is played with 7-8-9-10-J-Q-K-A in four suits, for a total of 32 cards. This is also known as a Piquet pack, as opposed to the 52 or 54 present in a full French deck (also known as a Poker deck, or a regular deck of playing cards). A sheepshead deck is made by removing all of the jokers, sixes, fives, fours, threes, and twos from a standard deck.

=== Card strength ===
Card strength in sheepshead is different from most other games. There are 14 cards in the trump suit: all four queens, all four jacks, and all of the diamonds. In order of strength from greatest to least:

- Q♣ Q♠ Q♥ Q♦
- J♣ J♠ J♥ J♦
- A♦ 10♦ K♦ 9♦ 8♦ 7♦

Also, there are 3 "fail" suits, each containing 6 cards (18 total).

- A, 10, K, 9, 8, and 7 of ♣, ♠, and ♥

When a card is a member of the trump suit, it loses its membership as part of its "standard" suit. For instance, the queen of clubs is in the trump suit, and cannot follow suit if another club is led.

Clubs, spades, and hearts take no precedence over other fail suits, unlike trump, which always take fail. The lead suit must be followed if possible; if not, then any card may be played.

=== Card point values ===
Each card is given a separate point value as follows:

- Ace — 11 points
- Ten — 10 points
- King — 4 points
- Queen — 3 points
- Jack — 2 points
- 9, 8, 7 — 0 points

The strongest cards (queens and jacks) are not worth the most points, giving sheepshead some of its unusual character.

There are 120 points total in the deck. The goal of the game is to get half of these (60 or 61); in case of a tie, the player who picked up the blinds loses, and that player's opponents win.

=== Scoring ===
Score is kept using money or game points, which are distinct from the point values of cards. Points are given/taken on a zero-sum basis. Players win different numbers of game points based on how many points they took during a round: scores are doubled if the picker or their opponents took less than 31 points (schneider), while scores are tripled if the picker or their opponents took no tricks. In variations which allow partners, the picker's score is doubled again if they choose not to play with a partner. When playing for money, each game point generally represents a common money unit.

=== The deal ===
The deck is shuffled and cut. The dealer typically deals two or three cards at a time until each player has an equal number of cards, with the remainder dealt to a separate pile called the "blind." The blind is typically dealt between rounds of the deal.

Some variants permit players to call for a redeal if their hand meets certain conditions, typically some combination of having no aces, no face cards, no trump, and/or no count/point cards.

=== Picking ===
The player to the left of the dealer gets first choice to take the blind. If they pass, the option is given to the next player. There are several variations if no player wishes to pick up the blind—the dealer may be required to pick up the blind, or may have the option to call a Leaster, or may be able to call a Doubler.

The individual who takes the blind is called the "picker". The picker adds the two cards in the blind to their hand and then must choose two cards to lay down or "bury". The buried cards are added to the picker's score if the picker's side takes at least one trick.

The picker may also have a partner on their team who will then play against the remaining players. Depending on the variant or house-rule, the partner must automatically be the player with the jack of diamonds, or the picker may be able to call the ace of a fail suit and have that player be their partner. In any case, the partner is not revealed until they play the relevant card.

=== Play ===
After the picker has buried their cards, the person to the left of the dealer plays the first card. Play continues clockwise until everyone has played. Every player must follow suit if possible. Trump is considered a suit, so if trump is led, and a player has trump in their hand, they must play trump. If a player cannot follow suit, then they can play any card from their hand. The person who played the card with the highest strength takes the trick (the highest trump, or if none, the highest card of the fail suit that was led). The player who took the previous trick then plays, or leads, a new card for the second trick. After all tricks have been taken, their point values are totaled and the winner declared, with all players adding or reducing their personal points accordingly (see the charts, above). The deal then shifts to the person to the left of the previous dealer.

== Play variations ==
There are a number of different play variations for sheepshead. Variants may change how partners are chosen, scoring, the suits considered fail, or what occurs when the blind is not picked. Variations in the number of players are discussed in the next section.

=== Partners ===
The following two variants apply only to five and six-player games, and possibly four-player games. Variants differ in whether the picker is permitted to choose to play alone, and in whether there are some situations where the picker may be required to play alone.

==== Called Ace ====
The picker chooses a called ace suit after picking the blind. Whoever has this called ace will be their partner. There are a few further rules behind this.

- The called suit must be a fail suit (clubs, spades or hearts).
- The picker must have at least one of the fail suit in their hand. The picker must keep at least one card of the fail suit in their hand (i.e. cannot throw them all off) until the first trick for which that suit is led, and then of course must follow suit. Also on the first trick for which that suit is led, the partner must play the ace (even if the player has another card of that suit).
  - If the picker has all 3 fail aces, they may call a 10 instead of an ace. The picker is obligated to hold the ace of that suit in their hand. When the called suit is led, the picker must play the ace. In addition, the person with the 10 takes the trick if it is not trumped.
  - If the picker does not have all 3 fail aces but has no fail suits for which they do not also have the ace, the picker may still call another fail suit's ace and utilize an "unknown." The picker lays a card face down (typically a low fail card or their lowest trump) and calls a fail suit for the unknown to represent. The unknown is played face down and has no power to take tricks, though its point value remains at the end of the game. Only the player taking the unknown is allowed to look at it until the end of the game
  - In some variants, the picker can call a suit for which they have the ace; they must save the ace and then it is their own "secret" partner.
- The picker can choose to go alone after picking up the blind. In this case, there will be no called ace.

==== Jack of diamonds ====
In this variant, the partner is automatically the individual with the jack of diamonds. Unlike the Called Ace variant, the partner is not required to play the jack of diamonds immediately. If the picker holds the jack of diamonds as a result of the deal or picking up the jack in the blind, the picker must play alone. There are also variants which permit a player holding the jack of diamonds to "call up" to a higher jack that they do not hold, to call the jack of clubs instead, or to call an ace instead as in the "called ace" version.

Schiller

In this variant, the first person after the dealer has to pick. All other rules previously established in the game are still intact. One final round of Schiller is often played to close the game.

=== Scoring ===
==== Calling sheepshead ====
One variant allows the picker to call "sheepshead." This means that the picker believes they can take every trick. If they succeed they receive twice the number of points for a trickless game, but if they miss a single trick (even one lacking points), they must pay twice the value their opponents would have paid them for a trickless hand.

- The picker is almost always required to play alone if they call sheepshead. Because of this, it is generally applied only to the jacks variant, or cut-throat games.
- Sometimes the picker is not allowed to call sheepshead if they do not have the jack in five or six-handed games.

==== Double on the bump ====
If the picker/partner do not win, they are "bumped," doubling scores for that round.

==== Cracking ====
In this variant, when a player picks up the blind, any player who was not given the opportunity to pick up the blind and who is not the picker's partner may knock or crack by knocking the table with their fist. This automatically doubles the point values determining the score when the game ends. In the aces variant, the crack must take place after the ace has been called but before the first card is played. Some variants allow responses to cracking, with the picker or partner allowed to re-crack or crack-back to quadruple scores and an opponent who did no crack to castrate the hand after a crack-back to octuple scores.

==== Blitzing or blitzers ====
This variant allows players to double the point value of the game by revealing that they have the two black or red queens.

- Typically, a blitz may only occur after a crack or re-crack.
- Some variants allow for a blitzing with the two black jacks, the two middle jacks or all four jacks.
- Some variants allow for blitzers after the hand has been played. Players with both black queens need to declare blitzers after playing the second queen during the hand.
- Because of the possibility of escalation, a limit may be placed to cap the maximum value the points are multiplied from blitzing and cracking.

=== Trump ===
==== Diamonds vs. clubs ====
Typically, diamonds are considered trump, but some groups use another suit (typically clubs around North Central Wisconsin). This would mean a nine of diamonds would be fail while a nine of clubs is trump instead.

Alternatively, in some groups, the strengths of the various queens and jacks differ from standard rules.

==== Spitz ====
A variant popular in some areas of Minnesota and Wisconsin is to change the order of strength of the trump cards. This is done by increasing the seven of diamond's strength to second in the list of trump:

- Q♣ 7♦ Q♠ Q♥ Q♦ J♣ J♠ J♥ J♦ A♦ 10♦ K♦ 9♦ 8♦

When playing this variant the seven of diamonds is referred to as "the Spitz". Another variation puts the seven of diamonds first in the list of trump.

=== No picker ===
Several different scenarios can occur if no one picks up the blind, including a forced pick, a Leaster, a Mittler, or a Doubler.

==== Forced pick ====
In this variant, the person on the end is required to pick the blind. This is sometimes offset by a "No Punish" rule, and statistics; if no one desired the blind, then there's a better chance that the blind has decent cards, unless the trump is evenly spread out.

==== Leasters ====
In a leaster, the person with the fewest points wins the hand. There is no partner, and the winner simply receives one point from every opponent in the game. The blind is set aside and normally given to the player who takes the last trick. House rules may allow the dealer to declare which trick is given the blind (e.g. the first trick, or the second, etc.). Another house rule may be to set the blind aside so it is not given to anyone. The blind is not viewed until after the hand is over.

- A common variant is to require a trick to win. In this variant, therefore, a player who takes every trick wins. As two further variants to this variant: (A) if a player takes a trick that has no points (all 7s 8s and 9s), and/or (B) a player wins by taking every trick—then, the winners gets points as if winning a "no trick" after picking up the blinds.
- One variant used when playing with three players is: a player may win without taking a trick, and actually wins double in this situation.
- In the event of a tied score, no stakes are exchanged, and the game proceeds to the next hand.

==== Mosters ====
A variant of the leaster is the moster, which is played the same as a leaster, but after the hand is scored, the player who took the most points pays out (as if for a simple loss) to all the rest of the players. Thus, in a five-player game, the affected player loses four points and the opponents get one each, unless the score is doubled by other means (cracking, etc.). The exception is taking all of the tricks, which is still scored as a win by the player doing so.

==== Mittlers (Middlers) ====
An alternative to playing leasters or Mosters, the player who wins this “no picker” game has the median number (middle value) of points among the five players after the hand is scored. Thus, the winner of the Mittler will have the third highest number of points. There will be two players with higher points and two players with lower points. If there is no clear middle value, no stakes are exchanged. This game is also known as “Michigan Mediocre,” named by the Ann Arbor Sheepshead Society (AASS) that created this variant.

==== Schneidster ====
Another leaster alternative, which follows most of the rules for a leaster but is won by the player who gets closest to 30 points (Schneider) without going over. In the event of a tie, the round is considered a wash. This variant originated in clubs in Madison, Wisconsin in the late 2010's, where the last person in picking order chooses which no pick rule they would like to use. The Schneidster provides an alternative for players who have low trump and high fail which would lose most tricks in a normal hand but take tricks in a leaster.

==== Doublers ====
In a doubler, the cards are reshuffled and a new hand is dealt and played as normal. However, at the end of this redeal, the point values lost and gained are doubled.

==== The pot ====
Typically occurring with a leaster (and during cash games), one point is placed into a pot for the next hand. Then, if the picker wins the hand, they split the pot with the partner (in a five handed game, the extra point goes to the picker such that they receive three and the partner receives a single point). However, if the picker loses the hand, the picker and partner must pay into the pot what they would have received.

- In some games, the picker and partner double the pot when losing; in others, they simply add a single pot each time. Additionally, the picker and partner may take the entire pot on a win, or they may receive a single pot.
- If the game ends before the pot is taken, or continues to build over several turns, the pot may be divided out to the individuals evenly. Alternately, showdowns may be played, where five cards are dealt one at a time to every player face side up. The best five-card poker hand then takes one or all of the pots.
- If a new player joins a game with a pot (bringing a game from five to six-handed, etc.,) typically the pot is divided up, or the new player adds one point for every pot present.

==== Schwanzers (Show Down) ====
All players reveal their cards after everyone has passed a dealt hand to discover the loser who pays the table 1 point each. The blind is discarded.

In German, 'Schwänzer' means a truant or a hooky player. Truancy refers to a student being absent from school, and therefore uneducated. Thus, a Schwanzer occurs because at least one player is uneducated in how to pick in the game of sheepshead.

The purpose of a Schwanzer, also known as a showdown, is to catch maurers without playing a leaster or another variant of a “no pick” situation. The loser is determined by the highest number of points in a hand. The Schwanzer points are scaled as follows: Queens = 3 points, Jacks = 2 points, Diamonds = 1 point.

For example, a hand with the Queen of spades (3 points), Jack of clubs (2 points), Ace of diamonds (1 point), 8 of diamonds (1 point), 10 of clubs (0 points), and 7 of spades (0 points) equals the Schwanzer point value of 7. (3+2+1+1)

If tied in points, the player with the most powerful trump loses. For example, a hand with the Queen of clubs (3 points) and Queen of diamonds (3 points) loses to the hand with Queen of spades (3 points), Jack of clubs (2 points) and the Ace of diamonds (1 point).

== Variations in the number of players ==
There are numerous variations in rules, so a discussion of house rules generally occurs before play begins. The following variations can be employed to accommodate different numbers of players.

=== Two-handed ===
1) Each player is dealt four cards in a row, face down. Then, four cards are dealt face up to each player and placed on top of the first four cards. The eight cards in front of each player are referred to as their 'battery' in the text below. Then, eight cards are dealt to each player's hand.

Every hand is played with no picking nor partner. Whichever player gets the higher number of points wins the hand.

Each trick has four cards - one from each player's hand, and one from each player's battery (table cards). The highest card, per normal rules, takes the trick. At the end of the trick, any uncovered face down card is turned face up, and is in play for the next trick.

For the first trick, the non-dealer leads a card from their hand, then the dealer plays from their hand, then the non-dealer's battery, then the dealer's battery. Whichever hand or battery takes the trick must lead the next trick. Each trick is 'hand hand battery battery', or 'battery battery hand hand'.

2) Sixteen cards are dealt face down in a four by four rectangle. Players are not allowed to look at the face-down cards. Then, a card is dealt face-up on top of these. The sixteen cards (eight stacks of two cards) closest to the dealer are the dealer's cards. A card must be face-up to be played. The opponent starts the first trick by playing one of their face-up cards, and the dealer responds by playing one of theirs. After each trick is played, any face-down cards uncovered are turned face-up. Play continues until all 32 cards have been played. Players are not allowed to look at their own face-down cards.

=== Three-handed ===
1) Each player is dealt ten cards, with two going to the blind. The picker faces the other two players.

2) The sevens of clubs and spades are removed, leaving thirty cards. Nine cards are then dealt to each player, with three going to the blind. The picker faces the others.

3) The six non-trump sevens and eights are removed, dealing eight cards to each player, with two in the blind.

=== Four-handed ===
1) Seven cards are dealt to each player with four in the blind. Given the large blind, this variation required the picker go cut-throat (without a partner).

2) The seven of clubs and seven of spades are removed (or the six of clubs and six of spades are added). Seven (or eight) cards are dealt to each player, with two in the blind. Either the jack or ace partner rules may be used.

3) Each player is dealt eight cards, with no blind. Either (A) the two players holding the black queens are partners, where the partners are secret until both cards are played, a player holding both black queens plays cut-throat against the three others; (B) the partners are the first two queens played; or (C) the partners are the first two played of any card agreed upon before the deal (7s, 8s, 9s, Ks, 10s, Js, Qs). In all these variations, the players with the agreed upon partner cards (black, red, or first two played) are considered the picker and partner for scoring purposes. In the latter variations, the timing of playing the agreed upon card is particularly important. For example, it may be worth it to waste the queen or play a card out of normal strategy to become partners with an individual who has already taken a good trick or two, or to avoid being stuck cut-throat or with a bad partner.

4) In this variation popular in southern Indiana (typically known by as "Sheephead"), jacks are higher than queens (still clubs-spades-hearts-diamonds), and hearts (rather than diamonds) are trump. Queens are worth 2 points and jacks are worth 3 points. The schneider (which is typically known as "frog") is 31 points, even for opponents. In the event of a tie (the hicker/partner and opponents both scoring 60 points), the opponents are victorious. All four players are dealt eight cards. Starting with the player to the left of the dealer, the player has the option to "hick" or pass. Once every player has been given the opportunity to hick, the players will announce what they wish to play in order starting with the first player to the left of the dealer. The options are to declare "call" (call a fail-suit ace for a partner), "The Best" (play normally against the other three), "side solo" (declare another suit rather than hearts to be trump, and then play against the other three), or "Billy" (plays against the three others but attempts not to take a trick). The suit of the called ace need not be declared until it is the winning hick.

The hick that is played depends on which hicks are made. The ranking of the hicks in ascending order is: call, Billy, side-solo, the Best. No cards of the same suit as the fail-suit ace are required in the player's hand when calling a fail-suit ace. Additionally, more than one Billy may be made and played simultaneously. In the event that both a Billy and a side-solo are called, the player who announced the Billy has the option to "lay it up", that is declare their intention to place their cards face up on the table and allow their opponents to see their hand. This allows the Billy to be ranked higher than the side-solo. A player who announces a side-solo may also decide to lay down their cards, once again out-ranking the Billy and allowing the side-solo to take precedence. A Billy may not be laid on the table without a side-solo being called, and a side-solo may not be laid on the table without another player offering to lay their Billy on the table. The Best always takes precedence, and the cards are never laid face up on the table. As such, the Best may be declared instead of hicking.

Scoring: Players play to 24 on the given system:

- Players who win a call (caller and partner) gain 2, 4, or 6 points (normal victory, no-schneider, and no-trick). If the calling team does not win the call, the opponents gain 4 points.
- The caller winning a Billy or side-solo gains 18 points, and opponents would gain 6 points if they win—and both are regardless of whether the opponents take a trick or get schneider. A laid-down Billy or side-solo wins the game outright, while opponents who win gain 8 points.
  - If multiple Billys are played at once that result in the hicker taking a trick, no points are awarded to any other players who are playing separate Billys, but opponents may win 6/8 points for as many Billys are tried and failed. If multiple players successfully make a Billy, they are each awarded 18 points.
- Winning The Best wins the game outright. Opponents who win gain 8 points.

An optional rule that some players employ is that, in the event that all players pass, "wilky" is played. In wilky, play begins with the player left of the dealer as normal with the goal to get as few points as possible. The player (or players if there is a tie) who scores the fewest points is awarded 2 points.

This variant may also be played with five players, in which case the dealer each round does not play or earn points.

=== Five-handed ===
Six cards are dealt to each player, with two to the blind. A partner may be chosen by either the ace or jack rules. The partner is the player with the called ace.

=== Six-handed ===
1) Five cards are dealt to each player, with two cards in the blind. The partner is automatically the jack of diamonds, and the game is played two against four. If the picker gets the jack of diamonds in the blind, they may call the next higher jack, not in their hand.

2) Five cards are dealt to each player, with two cards in the blind. The partner is automatically the jack of diamonds and the ace of the called suit, with the game played three against three. If the picker gets the jack of diamonds in the blind or the jack of diamonds has the ace of the called suit, it is played two against four.

3) Discard the sevens of clubs and spades. Five cards are dealt to each player, with no blind. Queen of clubs and queen of spades are partners, it is played two against four.

4) Discard the sevens of clubs and spades. Five cards are dealt to each player, with no blind. Seven of Diamonds is the highest trump. Queen of clubs, queen of spades, and jack of diamonds are partners. A player having both black queens or a black queen and jack of diamonds has the option to pass one of the cards to the player to the left for one of their cards. Passing must be done before the lead player plays out. Double on the bump is applied to this variation.

=== Seven-handed ===
1) Four cards are dealt to each player, with four to the blind. The picker takes all four cards from the blind, and buries four. The partner is automatically the jack of diamonds. If the picker has the jack, they may call up to the next highest jack, not in their hand.

2) Four cards are dealt to each player, with four to the blind. The picker takes two cards from the blind, and the player immediately behind them takes the other two blind cards; they bury together and then play as partners against the other five. Also known as Shit-On-Your-Neighbor sheepshead.

3) Four cards are dealt to each player, with four to the blind. The picker takes three cards from the blind, and the player immediately behind them takes the other card. The partner is automatically the jack of diamonds. The player behind the picker is not automatically the partner, so their bury may count towards the picker's opponents.

4) Four cards are dealt to each player, with four to the blind. A die is rolled, and the partner is whatever number is on the die with 1 representing the player to the pickers left, and counting clockwise with six being the person to the picker's right. Each takes and buries two cards.

5) Four cards are dealt to each player, with four to the blind. The picker takes 0, 1, or 2 cards, the person behind them is partner and takes 2, 1, or 0 card respectively. The two remaining cards are not revealed and are automatically buried for the other team. The Dealer may go "nuclear" giving all 4 of their cards to the other team's bury and taking the entire blind, the person behind them is still a partner.

6) Four cards are dealt to each player, with four to the blind. The picker takes 2 or all 4 cards in the blinds. If the picker takes 2 they roll a die to determine their partner, who will take the other 2. The number rolled correlates to the partner by counting players clockwise of the picker. If the picker takes all 4 cards from the blinds, they play alone. For the picker to take all four cards in the blind, they must do so by taking them all at once. Players are not allowed to look at 2 and then decide if they want the remaining 2 cards in the blinds.

=== Eight-handed ===
1) Four cards are dealt to each player. The two black queens are partners.

2) Four cards are dealt to each player. The queen of clubs, jack of diamonds, and 7 of diamonds are partners. If one partner has two of these cards, they can call the 8 of diamonds (if they have the 7 and the queen or jack) or jack of hearts (if they have the queen and the jack). If the other partner already has the 8 of diamonds or jack of hearts they can call again. It should always be 3 on 5 unless the partner chooses not to call another partner.

3) Four cards dealt to each player. First two queens played are partners.

== Glossary / Slang ==
The following phrases or slang can be used to describe certain behaviors or situations in the game. For more, see Glossary of card game terms.

=== Mauer ===
A player "mauers" when the player has enough power-cards to pick up the blind, and yet passes (whether for fear one's hand is not actually good enough, or worse, one hopes to set up another player to lose). Mauering is considered to be in very poor taste and in some cases players who do it often enough can be asked to leave a game. Of course, mauering can backfire if the hand results in a leaster, and the mauerer is stuck with what is then a poor hand.

There are different methods of deciding if a player has a strong hand. In a five-handed game, some players pick on any four trumps, while others decide based on the number of higher trump (queens and jacks). Others use a numbering system, giving each type of trump a point value and making the decision to pick based on a certain number of points. Statistically, players who have an opportunity to pick first need a stronger hand, while picking on the end usually means that since nobody else picked, the trump is fairly evenly spread out. Because of the complex nature of the game, in most cases, mauering is a matter of opinion.

=== Schmear ===
A player "schmears" a trick by playing a high-point card (usually an ace or ten) into a trick that a player thinks will be (or has already been) taken by one of their partners, in order to increase the points earned on that trick. The term may also be a noun, referring to the high-point card played in this manner. An example of schmearing (by Opponents 2 and 3):

1. Partner leads 10♦ (10 points)
2. Opponent 1 plays Q♣ (3 points)
3. Opponent 2 plays A♦ (11 points)
4. Picker plays 8♦ (0 points)
5. Opponent 3 (out of trump) plays 10♠ (10 points)

This trick was worth 34 points. That's schneider all by itself.

Opponent 1 is guaranteed to win the trick as the queen of clubs is the highest card. As a result, opponents 2 and 3 both took advantage of the situation and put high-counting cards down. Also note that the picker played the 8♦, a no-counting card—the opposite of schmearing.

Schmearing is an important strategy. In this example, schmearing increased the value of the trick by 21 points to a total of 34 points—schneider all by itself and over a quarter of the points available.

=== Renege (Cheating) ===
A player "reneges" means to fail to follow suit when able and required by the rules to do so. Reneging is a form of cheating. In most circles, this results in the guilty party forfeiting the hand.

=== Granny hand ===
When a player holds all or most of the good cards, there is no way for the opposition to win. This powerful hand is often derided for its ease of play

In some circles, the player simply lays down the granny hand and the opponents concede by acclamation. Even if not completely a granny hand, some circles permit a player to state that they believe they will take all of the remaining tricks (possibly requiring an explanation, say, "I have all of the remaining trump"), giving opponents an opportunity to object (say, if the calling player miscounted trump) -- forestalling the players from needing to play out the remainder of the hand.

=== Bumping ===
When a teammate uses a higher powered card to take a trick that already is already going to their team—usually when the trick is necessarily going to another teammate. Sometimes this is unavoidable especially in cases where there is only one card of a particular suit left in a player's hand. Sometimes this is strategic, such as to place an opponent on each side of the picker and/or the partner.

=== Collusion (Cheating) ===
As with any partner game, code words or signs can be used to cheat. This involves 2 players creating a word or phrase which tells their partner in crime what to lead. For instance, Player A and Player B are colluding with each other in a game of 4 handed. Player A has the lead and Player B is behind the dealer without a fail Spade. Player B uses the phrase "let's rock n' roll" to signal Player A to lead spades. Player A leads spades, the picker trumps it, and Player B trumps over the Picker. This is very much frowned upon and if caught, the players are usually kicked out of the game. Also called “Table Talk”.

=== Throwing Off / Slough ===
A player "throws off" or "sloughs" when, after a fail card is played and the player does not have any of that fail suit but does have trump, decides to play a fail card rather than trump. Sloughing well is a key to winning at sheepshead, especially as the picker. One popular situation to throw off is as follows and is known as "The Throw Off"; (1) a fail suit is led that the picker does not have, (2) the picker is 2nd in line, and (3) the picker throws off, usually because they have a poor hand, hoping their partner can take the trick.

== See also ==
- Ombre
- Boon
