= Piquesept =

Extinct German Card Game

- A point-trick game of the ace–ten family
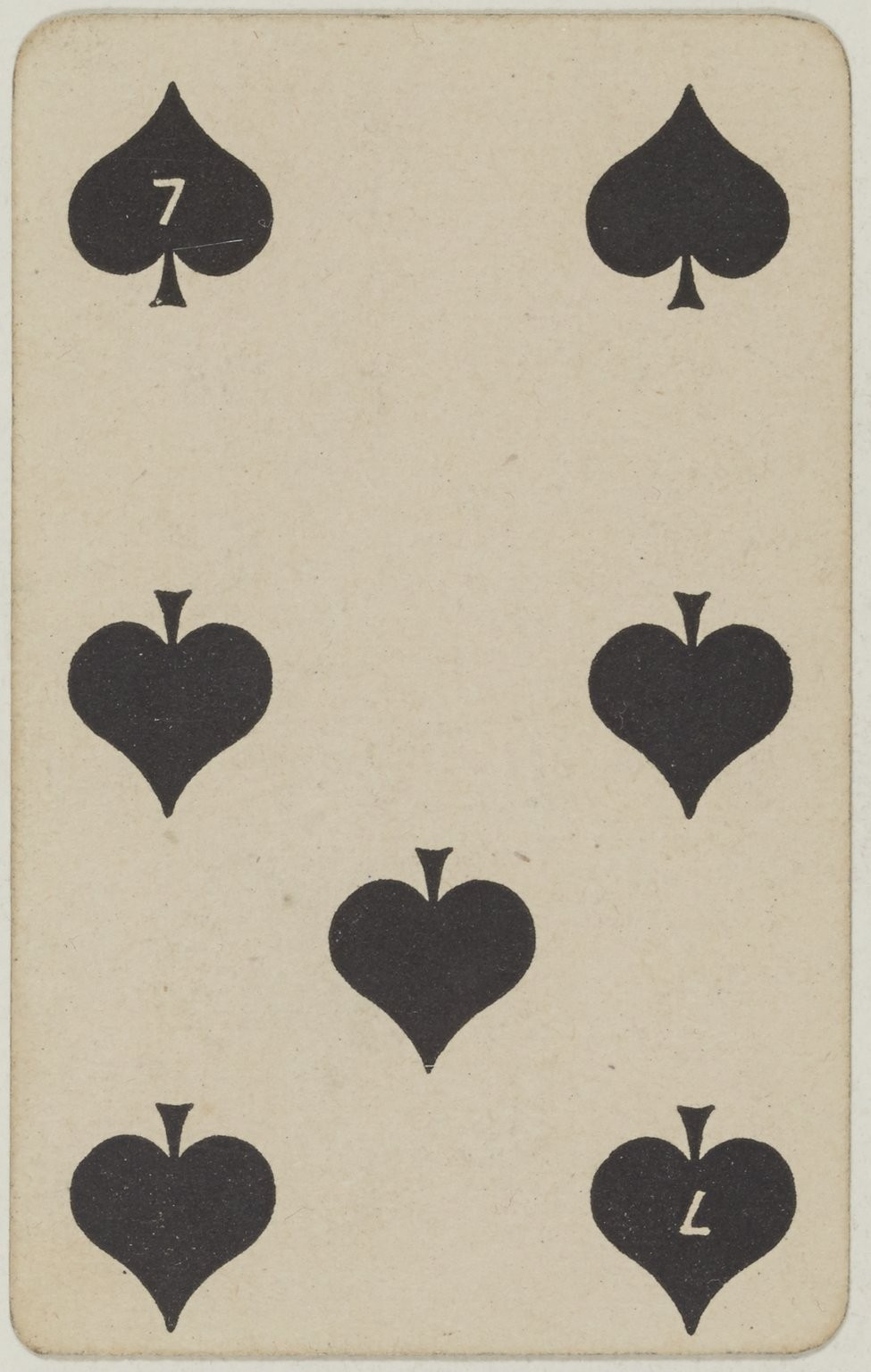
- The commanding card in Piquesept
- Origin: Germany
- Alternative names: Piqueseptspiel
- Type: Point-trick
- Players: 3-4
- Cards: 32
- Deck: French-suited cards
- Rank (high→low): Trumps: ♠7 ♠A ♠K ♠Q ♠J ♠10 ♠9 ♠8; Side suits: A K Q J 10 – 7
- Play: Presumed clockwise
- Spades are permanent trumps

Piquesept is an extinct German card game of the ace–ten family that is recorded from 1798 to 1840. It had the unusual features that the player with the Seven of Spades played it out immediately, automatically collecting the highest card from each defender and then did not have to follow suit, unlike the other players.

== History ==
Piquesept appears in several publications in 1798, its rules being recorded that same year by Cäsar and ascribed to a certain "Herr LE Kehr". Identical reprints of the rules, published in Berlin and Vienna, followed in the years to 1840. The fact that it is an ace–ten game in which the 10s rank low suggests it may well be older.

== Cards ==
The game uses a standard 32-card Piquet pack and four players receive 8 cards each. If three play, two Eights are removed – these must not include the ♠8 – and ten cards are dealt to each player. Spades are always trumps. The Seven of Spades is the commanding card; after it rank the cards of the trump suit in their natural order: ♠7 ♠A ♠K ♠Q ♠J ♠10 ♠9 ♠8. The side suits rank in natural order but with the Seven as the lowest card in each case.

Piquesept is an ace–ten game with the normal card values: Ace - 11, Ten - 10, King - 4, Queen 3 and Jack - 2. The Seven of Spades is also worth 10 points making a total of 130 points in the game. There are no points for taking the last trick as in some other ace–ten games.

== Play ==
The player with the ♠7 becomes the soloist and plays against the other three. He immediately plays the ♠7 to the table and each defender must then play his highest trump or, if he has none, his highest non-trump card. These are taken by the soloist and count towards his score at the end. Next, the player to the left of the soloist draws a card, unseen, from the soloist and gives in exchange a card of his choice. (Note: The source says this exchange happens "at the beginning of the game", but it presumably means after the first 'trick' otherwise there is a possibility that the Seven of Spades would be selected and the soloist would not then be able to lead it.) Thus the soloist may well lose a strong card in return for a worthless non-counter. The soloist then leads to the next trick.

The defenders must follow suit or trump if unable. However, the soloist has the advantage that he need not follow suit, but may use his trumps to win tricks containing high-scoring side suit cards. (Note: It is assumed that play is clockwise and that the winner of a trick leads to the next, although this is nowhere stated.) The winner is the side with 66 points or more.

== Literature ==
- _ (1798). Jahrbuch der Freude für 1798. Oct 1797. Leipzig: Salomon Lincke.
- _ (1805). Neuestes Spielbuch. Vienna: Johann Georg Edlen von Mößle.
- _ (1810). Neuestes Spielbuch. Vienna: Johann Georg Edlen v. Mößle.
- _ (1840). Vollständiges Spielbuch. Vienna: J.G. Ritter von Mösle's Witwe und Braumüller.
- Caesar (1798). Neuer Spiel-Almanach fürs Jahr 1798. Berlin: Wilhelm Oehmigke dem Jüngern.
- Cäsar, Julius (1799). Neuester Almanach für Spieler. Berlin.
- Cäsar, Julius (1800). Neuester Spielalmanach. Berlin.
- Engelmanns, Theodor (1798). Anleitung zum Piquet- Tresett- Boston- Kasino- Konnectionen- Piquesept- Goodhope- und Kleeblattspiel etc. Berlin. Listed in: Kiesewetter, Johann Gottfried Carl Christian (1798). Versuch einer fasslichen Darstellung der wichtigsten Wahrheiten der neuern Philosophie für Uneingeweihte. Berlin:Wilhelm Oehmigke dem jüngern. and in _ (1798). Journal der Erfindungen, Theorien und Widersprüche in der Natur- und Arzneiwissenschaft. Gotha: Justus Perthes.
