= Schneider (cards) =

Low score in card games

Schneider is a term used in many card games for a low card point score that results in boosting an opponent's game score. The threshold is usually half the total points needed for a win; below the threshold, the player or team is Schneider; above it they are 'out of Schneider'. Its natural extension is Schwarz, said of a player or team who loses the game without taking a single trick.

== Origin ==
The term Schneider ("tailor") is German and comes from the medieval guild of tailors. Tailoring was a trade often associated with financial difficulties. For example, the pejorative remark "a tailor doesn't weigh more than 30 lots", alluding to a tailor being underweight, was a common saying. People who were financially better off were thus "out of Schneider" i.e. "off the hook". In the 19th century, the term was also used by student fraternities. The drinking game "Lustig, meine Sieben", in which a pair of scissors was drawn on the table if one scored under 30 points, called the loser of the game a "tailor", who then had to drink twice the amount. In the wake of this the term was probably transferred to the then still relatively new game of Skat, which spread quickly, especially among Thuringian and Saxon students, and is now Germany's national game.

The colloquial proverb from Austria "To give someone a Schneider" means to defeat an opponent without their scoring. It may be applied to any sport or game, but the term is mainly used in the card game of Schnapsen or in curling.

== Card games ==
In certain card games, mainly point-trick games from Central Europe, a player or partnership that achieves less than half the required card points from their tricks to win the hand, is described as Schneider. They usually lose double the normal game points.

=== Skat ===
In the German national sport of Skat there are 120 card points in play and therefore a player needs at least 61 points to win the game. If the declarer scores 90 points or more (i. e. the defenders have 30 or fewer points), then the opponents are Schneider and the declarer is credited with a higher game score. Likewise, a declarer who fails to score at least 31 is Schneider and loses by a higher amount. An extension of Schneider is Schwarz. This is where all the tricks are won by one player or partnership and achieve an even higher game score. In order to achieve Schwarz, the opponent or opponents must not have won any tricks at all, even those which do not score any card points.

In Hand games where the skat (the two cards in the talon or stock) is not picked up, the declarer may announce Schneider, or Schneider and Schwarz. In open games Schwarz is automatically assumed and the game value increases accordingly. The player loses the game at this value, however, if he does not achieve the announced goal. Should the player become Schneider or Schwarz in this situation, there is no additional penalty; i.e. you cannot Schneider yourself.

=== Schafkopf ===
In the game of Schafkopf, if the soloist or declaring side score at least 91, they win Schneider and their opponents are said to 'be Schneider'. The defending side only needs to score 90, to win Schneider. That means that the soloist or declaring side must score at least 31 to be out of Schneider whilst the defenders only need to score 30 to do so. If a player or side wins no tricks by the end of the deal, they are Schwarz.

=== Schnapsen and 66 ===
In Austria's national game, Schnapsen, which is played between 2 players, 130 points are available: 120 in cards and 10 for winning the last trick. A player thus requires 66 points to 'go out' and win. A player also needs at least 33 points to be 'out of Schneider'. As before, a player is Schwarz if he or she takes no tricks at all. One game point is scored for a simple win, 2 for a Schneider win and 3 for a Schwarz win. The same rules apply to the German variant of Schnapsen, known as Sixty-Six.

=== Bauernschnapsen ===
In Bauernschnapsen, a variant of Schnapsen for four players, the term Schneider is used in a different way. In this game the aim is to be first to score 24 game points over several deals. This feat is recorded with a Bummerl or blob for the losers. However, if a team wins 24-0, the losers are Schneider and receive 2 Bummerls. A team that was winning 23-0, but then loses, receives a Retourschneider ("return schneider"), also called a Schuster ("cobbler"; probably a play on the fact that Schneider means "tailor") or Rücker ("returner"), which is worth 4 Bummerls.

=== Other card games ===
Other card games that use the terms Schneider or Schwarz include:

- Bavarian Tarock
- Bohemian Schneider
- Elfern
- German Schafkopf
- Herzblatt
- Officers' Skat
- Oma Skat
- Mucken
- Schieber Jass
- Schieberamsch
- Sheepshead
- Spitzer
- Wendish Schafkopf

== Darts ==
In German darts competitions, Schneider occurs if the game or leg is ended and the loser has not achieved enough points from which it is possible to end the game with 3 darts. In a double out this is 170 points, in a triple out or master out it is 180 points. The term was probably borrowed from Skat.

== Matsch ==
In some games, particularly of Austrian or south German origin, the term Matsch ("mud"), formerly Mätsch or Martsch, is used instead of Schneider, but often has the same meaning in card games. A player or team that has lost and typically scored fewer than ¼ of the points is said to be 'in the mud' (im Matsch, Matsch werden) or gematscht and usually has to pay double. To 'make a march' (einen Matsch machen) means to win all tricks. Examples include Einwerfen, German Tarok, Hundertspiel, Mariage, Skwitz and Réunion.

It can also mean a hand in which the loser wins no tricks at all, for example, in Bauerntarock, Dobbm, Droggn, Jaggln and games of the Swiss Jass family.

Some English accounts mistranslate the term as 'match' but, in the sense of taking all tricks, march is more accurate.
