= Ludwig von Alvensleben =

German writer

Karl Ludwig Friedrich Wilhelm Gustav von Alvensleben (1800–1868) was a German writer.

== Life ==
Ludwig von Alvensleben was born on 3 May 1800 in Berlin. He came from the Low German noble family of Alvensleben. At the age of thirteen, he took part in the German War of Liberation and began his career as an officer. In 1821, he was punished with two years of fortress arrest for a threatening letter written to Prince Augustus of Prussia. From 1825 to 1828, he completed a law degree in Leipzig, but could not take the final exam due to a lack of knowledge of Latin. However, he was able to make a living as a freelance writer, translator and journalist. In 1830, he was imprisoned for a short time because of a text "shadow and no light" (Schatten und kein Licht) printed in Halle and directed against the Leipzig police. In 1836, he temporarily directed the Meiningen Court Theatre. In 1841, he moved to Vienna. There he took an active part in the revolutionary uprisings in October 1848 and was initially sentenced to death after being arrested, but then pardoned to one year in prison and expelled from Vienna after serving his sentence. His literary work was often impaired by frequent illnesses, so that he was in need and had to be supported by his family.

== Works ==
Alvensleben was a versatile writer in the fields of entertainment, games and the theatre. Under his pseudonyms Gustav Sellen and Chlodwig he wrote a number of his own novellas and novels, was successful as a translator from English and French and was the editor of various magazines. The journal Allgemeine Theater-Chronik, founded by him in 1832, is still significant in terms of theatre history. It appeared until 1873 and he edited it until 1837. He also published the Journal for the German Aristocracy with Friedrich de la Motte Fouqué from 1840 to 1844.

His translations included Napoleons Werke (6 volumes, Chemnitz 1840), Eugène Sue's Sämmtliche Werke (Leipzig 1838–46) in 24 volumes and the works of Balzac, Molière, Dumas, Swift (Gulliver's Travels), Defoe (Robinson Crusoe), Casanova (Memoirs in 13 books). In total, he translated over 140 novels and plays and alongside Georg Nikolaus Bärmann (1785–1850), was the most important German translator of his time.

Among his own works is The Lying Emperor – Destinies of the Lord of Münchhausen jun. (Meissen and Pesth 1833) – a time-critical satire that was reprinted in 1966 and 1968 (as a paperback) – together with the original Münchhausen from 1768 – and characterized as follows: "Alvensleben was a revolutionary spirit who had the courage to show the breaks he recognized in the state and social order as well as in the way people live and work together. This remarkable attitude, which did not stop at his own, still privileged social class, makes him particularly likeable. " (Wackermann, 1966).

His other works included: Narratives (Erzählungen), The Chastising Castle Spirit (Der strafende Burggeist, historical novel), Novellas and Narratives (Novellen und Erzählungen, Nuremberg 1831), The Debunked Jesuit (Der entlarvte Jesuit, Meissen 1831 – several editions), Life Portraits, Travel Pictures and Novellas (Lebens- und Reisebilder und Novellen, Leipzig 1841), Encyclopedia of Social Games (Enzyklopädie der Gesellschaftsspiele, Leipzig 1853, nine editions to 1893), Eve-of-Wedding Party Jokes (Polterabend-Scherze, Quedlinburg 1858, nine editions to 1888), Garibaldi (biography, Weimar 1859), Prince Lobkowitz or Revenge to the Death (Fürst Lobkowitz or Die Rache bis über das Grab, historical novel, 3 volumes, Vienna 1862/63), General World History for the People (Allgemeine Weltgeschichte für das Volk, 3 volumes, Vienna 1865–1872).

== Family ==
He was a son of the Prussian hussar major, August von Alvensleben (1775–1819), from the House of Redekin, and Countess Charlotte von Schlippenbach a.d.H. Schönermark (1777–1831). In 1828, he married Florentine Herzog (1807–1833); in 1834, Elvire Böhn (1818–1853) and in his third marriage in 1853, Emma Greiffeld (1831–1909). These marriages resulted in nine children, five of whom died in childhood. His grandmother was the actress, Friederike von Alvensleben, born née von Klinglin (1749–1799). This line expired with Bodo von Alvensleben (1903–1954) in the male line. Ludwig von Alvensleben died on 3 August 1868 in Vienna.

== Literature ==
- Alvensleben, L. von (1830a). Erzählungen (in German). Halberstadt: Brüggemann. OCLC 830939415.
- Alvensleben, L. von (1830b). Der strafende Burggeist, oder, Der Verfall der Harzbergwerke: Geschichtlicher Roman aus der Zeit Kaiser Heinrichs IV (in German). Meissen: Bei F.W. Goedsche. OCLC 830939673.
- Bachleitner, Norbert (1989). "Übersetzungsfabriken". Das deutsche Übersetzungswesen in der ersten Hälfte des 19. Jahrhunderts. Internationales Archiv für Sozialgeschichte der deutschen Literatur (IASL). OCLC 610091337. n.b. An appendix contains and index of the translations of Ludwig von Alvensleben.
- Goedeke, Karl (1913). Jacob, Herbert (ed.). Grundriss zur Geschichte der deutschen Dichtung aus den Quellen (in German). Vol. 8: Vom Weltfrieden bis zur französischen Revolution 1830 Dichtung der allgemeinen Bildung. Leipzig: Verlag von L. Ehlermann. OCLC 878133508.
