= Blattla =

Bavarian card game for four players

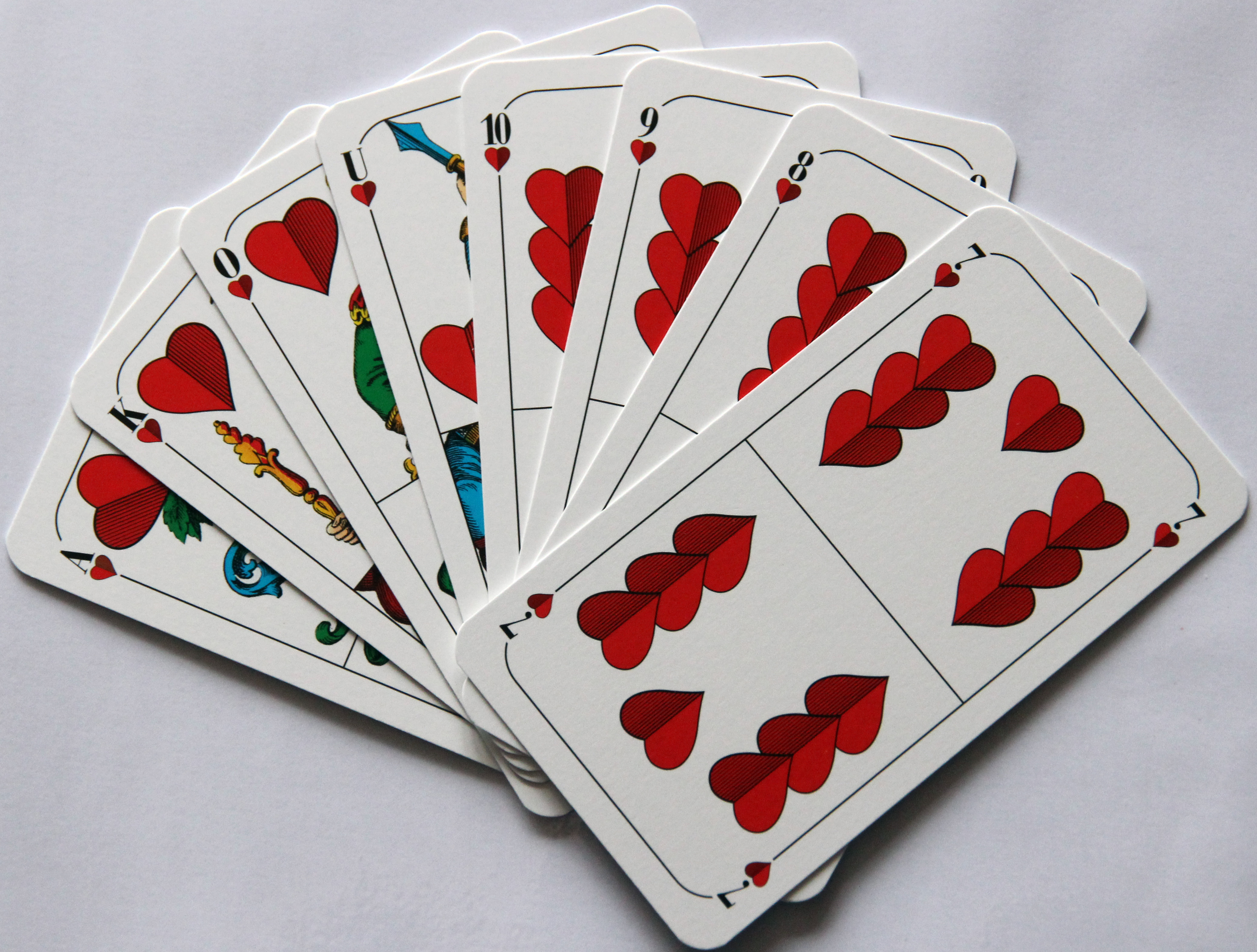
- The trump suit in Blattla
- Origin: Germany
- Type: Point-trick
- Players: 4
- Cards: 32
- Deck: German
- Rank (high→low): A 10 K O U 9 8 7
- Play: Clockwise

Related games
- Bierkopf • Mucken • Schafkopf

Blattla is a Bavarian card game for four players, who usually form two teams of two for each deal. It is a simplified version of Schafkopf and Bierkopf and is thus a point-trick game. Unlike those two games, in Blattla the Obers and Unters are not permanent trumps. In order to learn the rules of Schafkopf, it can be an advantage to first become familiar with Blattla. The game is traditionally played with Bavarian pattern cards.

== Cards ==
Blattla is a four-handed game played, in Bavaria, using a Bavarian pattern pack, a variant of the German suited deck, and, in Franconia, with the related Franconian pattern pack. It is played with 32 cards with 8 cards being dealt to each player.

=== Suits ===
German packs have four suits: Eichel (Acorns = Clubs), Gras (Leaves = Spades), Herz (Hearts) and Schellen (Bells = Diamonds).

Suits of the Bavarian pattern pack
Acorns (Eichel)	Leaves (Grün/Gras)	Hearts (Herz)	Bells (Schellen)
Acorn symbol of Bavarian playing cards	Leaves symbol of Bavarian playing cards	Hearts symbol of Bavarian playing cards	Bells symbol of Bavarian playing cards

=== Trick-taking strength ===
The cards’ trick-taking power broadly corresponds to their card point value. Thus the Sow (Sau), marked with an "A", is the highest-ranking card. Then follow the: Ten > King > Ober > Unter > Nine > Eight > Seven > Six. This ranking is also valid within the trump suit as well as the plain suits. Hearts are permanent trumps.

Ranking of the cards
Permanent trump suit
A 10 K O U 9 8 7 6
Plain suits
Acorns	Leaves	Bells
A 10 K O U 9 8 7 6	A 10 K O U 9 8 7 6	A 10 K O U 9 8 7 6

=== Card values ===
The card values are exactly the same as in Schafkopf or the related games of Dobbm, Bauerntarock and Bavarian Tarock. The ten, with 10 points, is just below the Daus (11 points) in value, but well above the King (4), Ober (3) and Unter (2). The so-called "sparrows" (Spatzen) i.e. the Nines, Eights and Sevens – also variously called "blanks" (Leere or Luschen), "nothings" or "nixers" (Nichtser(le)) – only play a role during the game based on their trick-taking ability or as guard cards, but do not score points at the end of the hand. There are 120 card points in the deck.

Cards	Symbol	Value (points)
Sow (Sau)	S	11
Ten	10	10
King	K	4
Ober (Bauer)	O	3
Unter (Wenz)	U	2
Nine	9	0
Eight	8	0
Seven	7	0

== Aim ==
The aim of Blattla, like Schafkopf, is to score a certain number of points by winning tricks. For the declaring team, a game is normally won with 61 points (Augen). If they score 91, they have won with schneider (mit Schneider gewonnen); and if they manage to win every trick they have won with schwarz (schwarz gewonnen). When they reach 31 points the declaring team is 'free of schneider' (Schneider frei). By contrast, the defending team wins the game if they reach just 60 points, they win with schneider on scoring 90 points and are schneider free with just 30 points. An exception are the Tout contracts, which are only won if all the tricks are taken; schneider and schwarz playing no part.

For the declaring team	Declaring team score	Defending team score	For the defending team
won with schwarz	won all tricks	lost all tricks	lost with schwarz
won with schneider	91–120 points	0–29 points	lost with schneider
straight win	61–90 points	30–59 points	straight loss
straight loss	31–60 points	60–89 points	straight win
lost with schneider	0–30 points	90–120 points	won with schneider
lost with schwarz	lost all tricks	won all tricks	won with schwarz

== Contracts ==
Fundamentally there are two main types of contract: the normal game (Normalspiel) and solo games (Solospiel). A normal game is also called a Sauspiel ("sow game"). Hearts are permanent trumps. A player who believes that, with the help of a partner, he can score at least 61 points, calls the Sow (sometimes called an Ace, albeit strictly a Deuce) of a suit, which is not a trump; for example: "I'll play with the Sow of Bells" ("Ich spiele mit der Schellen-Sau!") The owner of that card is now the partner of the caller (Rufer).

In solo games, the soloist must be able to win at least 61 points alone, because they are playing against the other three players who become the defenders. The various solo contracts are:

- Heart Solo
- Acorn Solo
- Grass Solo
- Bell Solo.

The trump suit in solo games is always nominated by the soloist. Other solo variants as in Schafkopf (Wenz, Geier, Habicht, Suit Wenz, Suit Geier and Suit Habicht) are not available in Blattla. All solo games may also be played as a "tout", whereby the soloist commits to capturing every trick.

== Playing ==
=== Dealing ===
The dealer is determined by cutting the cards. The first dealer is the one who cuts the highest card. The dealer now shuffles the cards and offers the pack to the player on his right to cut. In cutting (Abheben) there must be at least 3 cards in each 'half' of the pack. The pack may also be cut up to three times. The cutter may opt to ‘knock’ instead of cutting and then instruct the dealer to deal the cards differently from usual; for example, by asking for the cards to be dealt in packets of all 8 instead of in two packets of 4, or dealing anti-clockwise instead of the usual clockwise. In the following the cards are dealt clockwise in two packets of 4, beginning with forehand, the player to the left of the dealer. Next each player checks his hand and, beginning with forehand again, each player announces whether they will 'play' or 'pass.'

=== Announcements ===
If a player announces he is ready to play, he must make it clear whether he intends to play with a partner or to go solo in order to win at least 61 points. The nearer a player sits to the dealer's left, the greater the priority he has to play. Thus if forehand announces "I’ll play", he has the right to play a normal game. The remaining players may only announce a higher-value contract, i.e. a solo game. The ranking of the different contracts is as follows (beginning with the highest value game): Heart Solo Tout > Acorn Solo Tout > Grass Solo Tout > Bell Solo Tout > Heart Solo > Acorn Solo > Grass Solo > Bell Solo > normal game (Sow).

=== Trick-taking ===
Players must follow suit if possible. If unable to do so, they may play a trump or discard a card of their choice. If any trumps are played to the trick, the highest trump wins; failing that, the highest card of the led suit.

== Scoring ==
Available contracts
Contract	Trumps	Game type	Game points for a win Straight/schneider/schwarz
Rufer	Hearts	Partnership (2 x 2)	1/2/3
Bell Solo	Bells	Solo game	6/9/12
Grass Solo	Leaves	Solo game	6/9/12
Acorn Solo	Acorns	Solo game	6/9/12
Heart Solo	Hearts	Solo game	6/9/12
Tout	Chosen suit	Tout is one of the above solos in which all tricks are taken	15

N.B. schneider and schwarz attract a bonus point except in Tout contracts.
