= Bauerchen =

Card game

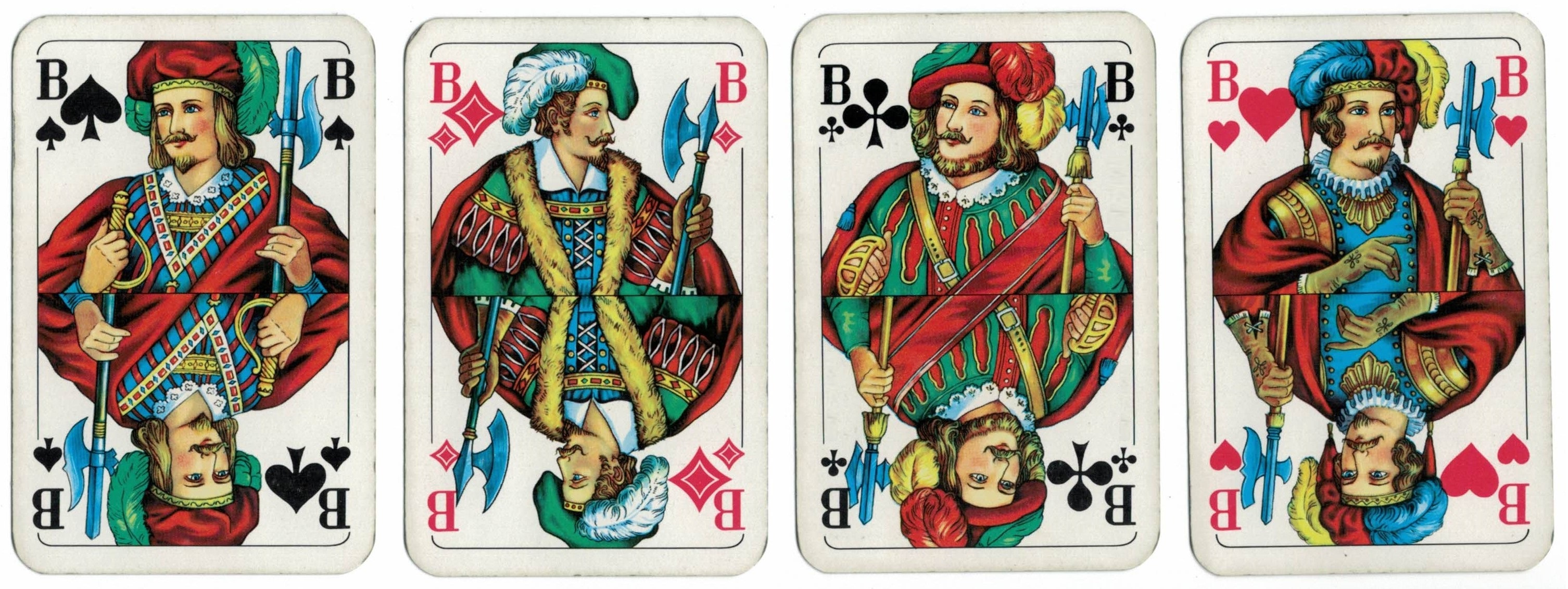
- The four Bowers
- Origin: Palatinate, Germany
- Type: Trick-taking
- Players: 4
- Cards: 20
- Deck: French pack
- Rank (high→low): ♣J ♠J ♥J ♦J; TA TK TQ T10-7; A K Q 10-7 (led suit)
- Play: Clockwise

Bauerchen, also Bauerchens, Bauerspiel, Bauersche or Bauersches, is a trick-taking card game of the ace–ten family for four players that is played in the Palatinate region of Germany, especially around the city of Kaiserslautern, as well as in south Hesse. It is often played during leisure times as an alternative to well known games such as Schafkopf or Skat. Regular Bauerchen tournaments also take place. The game is named after its four permanent trumps or "Bowers" (German and Palatine: Bauer).

== History ==
Historically the game was popular in the Siegerland and in the county of Lahn-Dill-Kreis, where this "strange and traditional card game" was associated with the tradition of making Stauze(n)weck or Studdewäcke - local buns, particularly around the Christmas-New Year holiday period. The game was played in taverns that were often attached to bakeries. The winners of a game won a Stauzeweck from each of the losing players. It was already popular in Kaiserslautern in 1949. In 1965 it was reported as dying out with only 10 men in the village of Haiger able to master the game and being completely unknown in the surrounding area.

Today the game seems to have centred itself on the city of Kaiserslautern where Bauerchen tournaments (Bauersches Turniere or Preisbauer-Turniere) take place irregularly in various pubs in and around the city and also in the surrounding region, for example at Herborn, Oberwörresbach, Schwedelbach, Weilerbach and Rodenbach. Tournaments have also been organised in the Darmstadt area at Worfelden. The entry fee is decided by the publican or tournament organiser.

== Players ==
Bauerchen is a game for four, the two players sitting diagonally opposite one another forming a team, resulting in two teams of two.

== Cards ==
The game is played with 20 cards from a French-suited pack, typically of the Berlin pattern. A French-suited Skat pack may be used, in which case the Sevens, Eights and Nines are removed leaving the: Ace, Ten, King, Queen and Bower (Jack). The suits are:

French suits
Clubs	Spades	Hearts	Diamonds
Kreuz/Kreiz	Schippe/Schibbe	Herz	Karo/Karro

=== Trumps ===
Permanent trumps are the so-called Bowers (Bauern) i.e. promoted Jacks, from which the game gets its name. In addition there are all the cards in the trump suit, the ranking of the individual cards remaining the same as normal. Consequently there are always eight trumps in the game. These are, from the highest Bower to the lowest trump card: Bower of Clubs (Pal.: de Ald) > Bower of Spades (Pal.: Noo-Beschd) > Bower of Hearts > Bower of Diamonds > Trump Ace > Trump 10 > Trump King (Pal.: Kenisch) > Trump Queen (Pal.: Dahm).

=== Card points ===
The values of the individual cards are as follows:

Ranks and card-point values of cards
Rank	A	10	K	Q	J (Bower)	9	8	7
Value	11	10	4	3	2	–		

In addition, the last trick of the game usually scores 10 points extra, so that there is a total of 130 points per game. Where this is the case, it is referred to as the 'Lautern game' (Pal.: Lautrer Spiel) because there is a variant played outside of Kaiserslautern in which the last trick does not score a bonus. Schneider is then 31 points, not 33 and only 61 are required to win, not 66.

== Playing ==
A 'game' is a deal of five tricks, a 'round' comprises several games - until one team reaches 12 points. The team that wins two rounds scores a stein ("rock"), sometimes called a knoddel; after which a new stein is played.

=== Dealing ===
Dealing and play are clockwise. Dealer shuffles the cards and offers them to the right for cutting. The cards are then dealt in packets of 2 and then 3 to each player, each player receiving five cards. Players pick up their cards and forehand (on the dealer's left) calls trumps before leading to the first trick. When the game is finished, forehand then becomes the next dealer. Sometimes, trumps are announced as soon as forehand receives and picks up the first two cards and before the rest are dealt.

=== Trick-playing rules ===
Each player must play to the trick in accordance with the following rules:

1. Players must always follow suit if possible (Farbzwang).
2. If unable to follow suit, players must trump (Trumpfzwang).
3. If unable to do either, a player may play any card (where possible 'smearing' their partner with high-value cards or playing low-value cards to tricks likely to be won by their opponents).
4. If a trump is played, players must overtrump if possible (Stichzwang). (Note: It is not clear if players must always head the trick when following suit.) If unable to do so, they must still play a trump. If that is not possible, rule 3 applies.

=== Other rules ===
1. Natural Trick (Naturstich; Pal.: Naduhr): a suit trick (Farbstich) is one to which no trump has been played and the trick is thus made up of natural cards i.e. the Ace wins the trick (Ace, 10, King, Queen).
2. Melding (melden; Pal.: Melde): a player who has a King and Queen of the same suit in hand and plays either one of them, can meld a "20", i.e. on the scoresheet and extra game point (Rundenpunkt) is credited. If they are of the trump suit, the player may meld a "40" and receives 2 bonus points. A meld cannot be declared if it would take the game score to 13 points.
3. Doubling (spritzen; Pal.: Schpritz): the team that announced trumps plays "at home" (zuhause) and their opponents are said to be playing "away" (auswärts). A player from the away side has the right to "double" (spritzen), if sure of winning. In response, the home side may redouble (zurückspritzen) by calling "retour" or "re". Teams may spritz as often as they like and raise the stakes, usually 3-4 times being enough.
4. Cards down (Kart' ab): a player who wants to try and win all the tricks single-handed i.e. without the assistance of the partner, can say "cards down", "single" (Ger.: ledig; Pal.: ledisch) or "bump" (Pal.: Buckel), which means that the partner must lay his or her cards face down on the table and no longer take part. The winner of a solo game automatically gets 12 points and ends the round.

=== Scoring ===
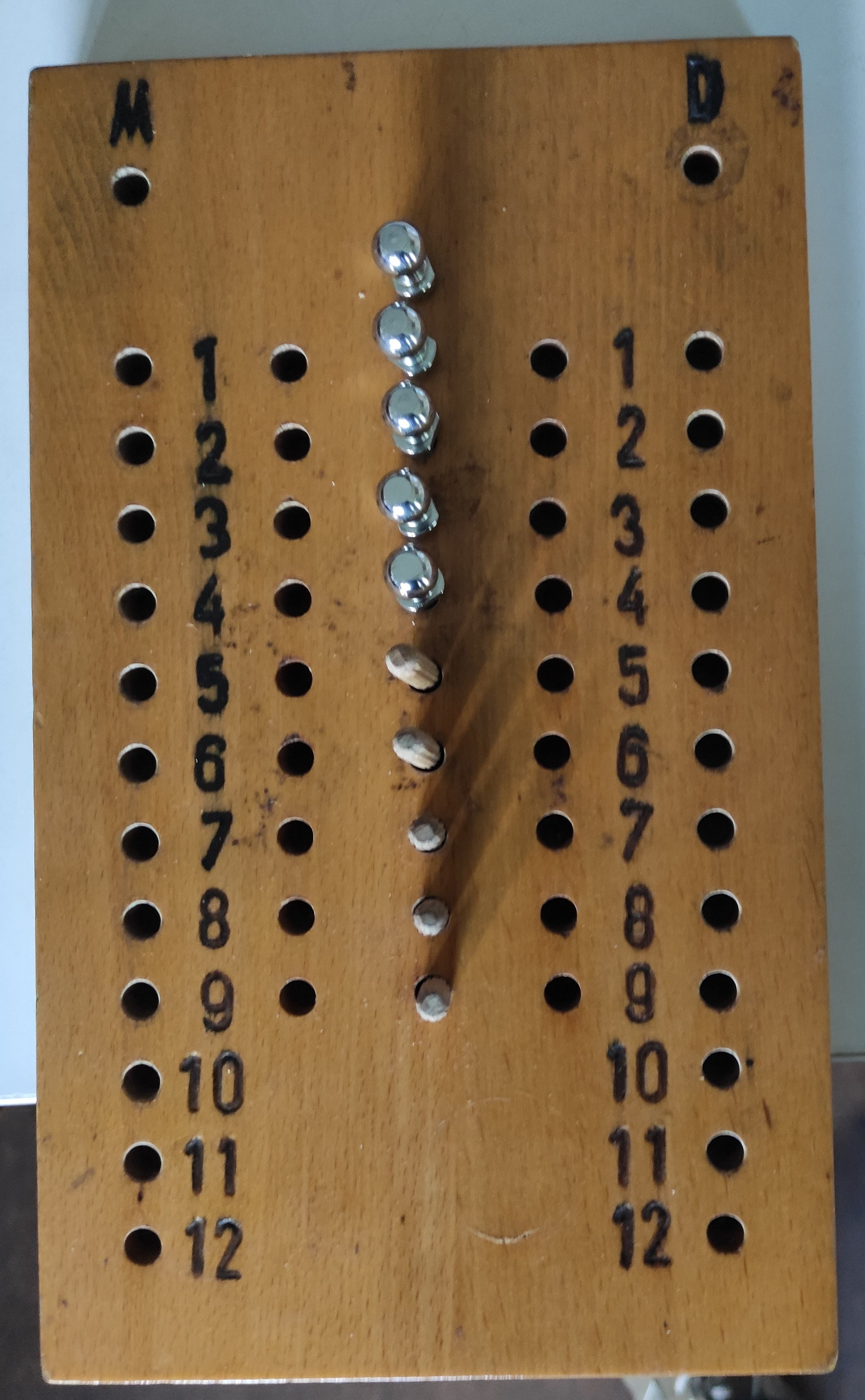
A scoring board for Bauerchen

Game is 12 points. If a team reaches 12, the opposing side is given a knoddel. (Note: Knoddel is a south German word for the rounded droppings of goats, hares and horses. It is thus probably recorded as a 'blob' on the slate or scoresheet as in other traditional Austro-German games.)

If the opponents get 2 knoddels, the team wins a stein, which used to mean that their opponents had to buy them a stein of beer, i.e. a litre of beer.

If both teams have one knoddel (or sometimes two knoddels) each, the deciding game is called a "Gehampelter", "Hängo" or various other names.

Game points are awarded depending on the level of card points won. If the game is played without a bonus for the last trick, the levels are correspondingly lower. So, if the opposing team scores...

- 0 card points - schwarz (Ger.: nackig gespielt or Pal.: nackisch gschpielt): 3 game points
- 8 - 32 (30) card points - schneider: 2 game points
- 33 (31) - 64 (59) card points - schneider frei: 1 game point

If playing with the last trick bonus, the target to be out of schneider is sometimes set at 34, not 31. If the points are split 65:65, the away team wins. If the away team wins they always get an extra game point (i.e. 2, 3 or 4 game points). If players have doubled (spritzt), the points are doubled for each Spritze.

== Optional rules ==
1. Carry over (Ger.: Weiterschreiben;Pal.: Weiterschreibbe): a round ends with 31 points, but excess points are carried forward to the next round. Also called the Siegelbach rule.
2. Forty Rule or Melding Out (Ger.: 40er-Regel bei 10 Rundenpunkten; Pal.: Ausmelde): instead of an extra 2 game points, only 1 is added for a meld of "40".
3. Last Card Trump (Ger.: Die Letzte; Pal.: Die Letscht): a player dealt 2 Bowers at the start and who therefore has to announce trumps, may turn his or her 5th and last card for trump instead. Variation: forehand may opt to turn the fifth card dealt for trump if undecided after receiving two cards, whatever they are. (Note: This only makes sense if the rule is that forehand announces trumps on receiving the first packet of two cards.)
4. Single (Ger.: Ledig; Pal.: Ledisch): In a Gehampelten ("decider", Pal.: Gehambelder), players may not announce a solo game (Ledig Spiel or Buckel).

== Hessian variant ==
The former Hessian variant was described by Löeber in 1965 under the name Bauerschspiel. It was a game for four players in two teams of two using a Skat pack minus the 7s and 8s leaving 24 cards. Again the highest cards were the Jacks. After dealing 5 cards to each player, trumps were determined by turning the next card (not by forehand). Curiously, you had to take either the first two tricks or the last three to win. Each team chalked up five crosses (Striche) thus, +++++, and one was erased for each win (en Strich aus) or added if you lost (en Strich oo), which suggests there may have been some sort of bidding. The team that was first to erase all five received a 'blob' (Nullchen) on the slate and a bun called a Stauzewecke from each of the losing players. Löeber admits that he has not been able to describe the finer points of the game.

== Literature ==
- Ahrens, Gerhard (2011). Mythos Fritz Walter: Vom Betzenberg verweht?. Norderstedt: BOD. ISBN 9783833490507.
- Krämer, Julius (1965-1998). Pfälzisches Wörterbuch. Franz Steiner, Wiesbaden.
- Löeber, Karl (1965). Beharrung und Bewegung im Volksleben des Dillkreises/Hessen. Elwert.
- Muhr, Gisela (2014). Spritz! Z'rück! Un' druff!. Rheinbach: Regionalia. ISBN 978-3-95540-123-8
