= Tournament Schafkopf =

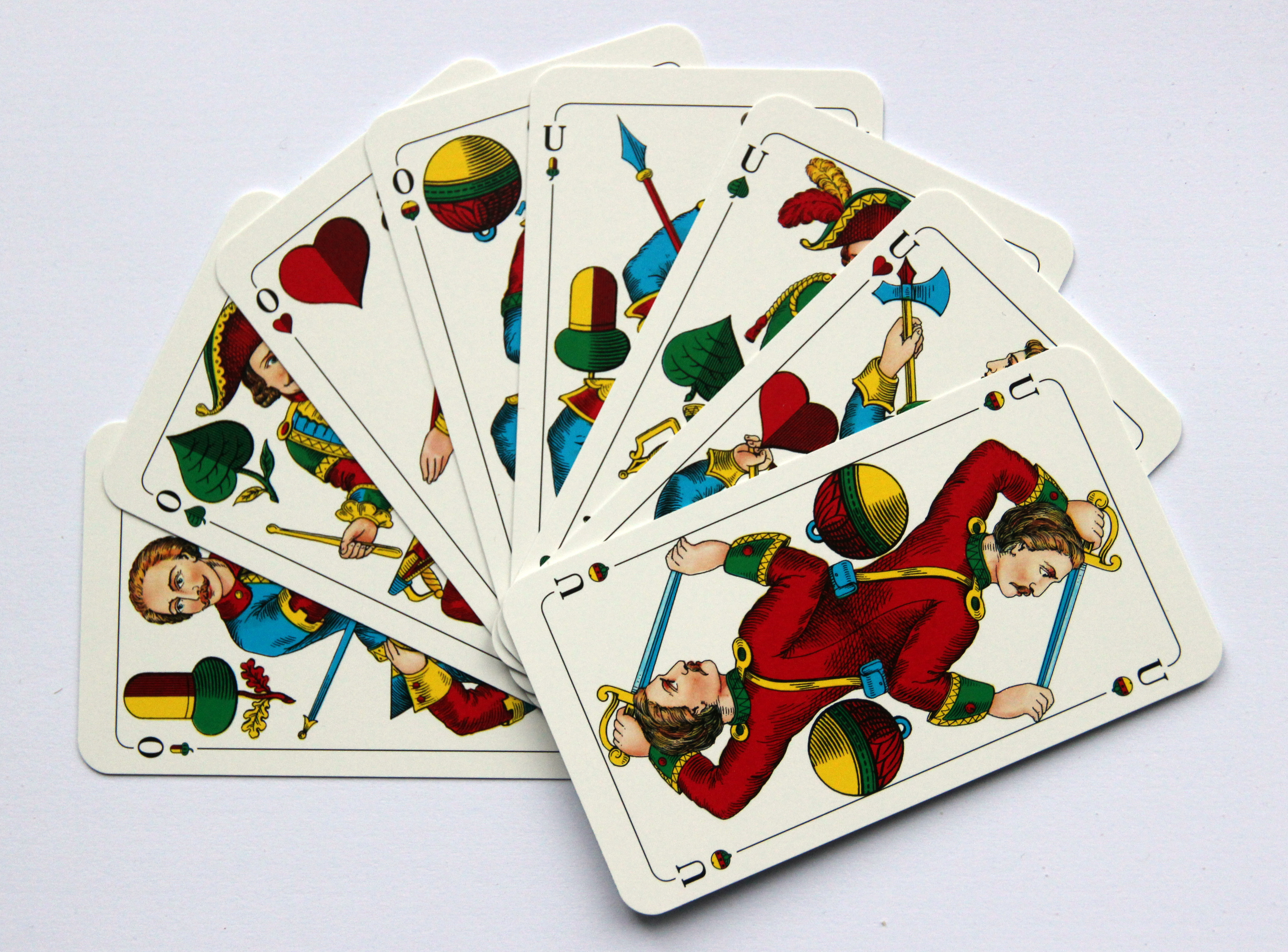
The top trumps in Schafkopf

Tournament Schafkopf (German: Turnierschafkopf, Preisschafkopf or Schafkopfrennen) is an organised form of the popular card game, Schafkopf, in which large numbers of players compete for prizes. Such tournaments are mainly held in countries where Schafkopf is popular such as Germany, Austria, Hungary and the Czech Republic.

== Schafkopf tournaments and German law ==
According to section 284 of the Strafgesetzbuch (penal code) in German law, Schafkopf is not a game of chance (gambling game) since all the cards are dealt, and there is thus no legal objection. The organisation of Schafkopf tournaments is governed by German commercial law, especially section 33d of the Gewerbeordnung (GewO, licensing requirements), and section 5a of the Spielverordnung (gaming regulations). These make a fundamental distinction between:

- commercial events where the aim is monetary gain (subject to licensing iaw section 33d of the GewO)
- non-commercial events where the aim is not primarily financial (not subject to licensing)

In the latter case the entry fee must not be greater than 15 € and the winnings must distributed as non-monetary goods. Also, as a leisure event, Schafkopf tournaments in Bavaria must in principle also be reported in accordance with Article 19 of the Bavarian LStVG law (competent authorities are the county or municipal authorities).

== Special rules ==
Tournaments often have special rules not used in everyday play:

- In large tournaments the cutter shuffles the cards a second time instead of cutting them.
- Cards are often dealt in four packets of 2 rather than 2 packets of 4.
- If everyone passes, the usual rule is to play a 'Force' or 'Muss' game instead of throwing the cards in. Other options are the contracts of Kreuzbock or Ramsch.
- Often there is something called Reuegeld or Weitergeld, a form of monetary forfeit paid into a pot known as the stock; if a hand is thrown in, each player pays a specified amount into the pot which is then distributed at the end of the tournament. The abandoned game is recorded with a dash on the points list and the same dealer deals again.
- Another form of Reuegeld is that the declarer has to pay a special contribution into the pot after losing a game (especially a solo game). Some of this Reuegeld may be paid directly to the table winners.

== Tournament scoring ==
The following table gives typical tournament scoring:

Contract	plus/minus								only plus							
Game	for the player(s)				for the defenders				for the player(s)				for the defenders			
Game	won		lost		won		lost		won		lost		won		lost	
Normal game (Rufspiel/Sauspiel)	+ 1		− 1		+ 1		− 1		1		/		1		/	
Schneider	+ 2		− 2		+ 2		− 2		2		/		2		/	
Schwarz	+ 3		− 3		+ 3		− 3		3		/		3		/	
with or without Matadors	each + 1		each - 1		each + 1		each - 1		each 1		/		each 1		/	
Solo or Wenz	+ 12	+ 6	− 12	6	+ 4	+ 2	− 4	− 2	12	6	/	/	4	2	/	/
Schneider	+ 12	+ 9	− 12	9	+ 4	+ 3	− 4	− 3	12	9	/	/	4	3	/	/
Schwarz	+ 12	+ 12	− 12	12	+ 4	+ 4	− 4	− 4	12	12	/	/	4	4	/	/
with or without Matadors	each + 3		each - 3		each + 1		each - 1		each 3		/		each 1		/	
Solo or Wenz Tout	+ 18		− 18		+ 6		− 6		24 48		/		8 16		/	
with Matadors	each + 6		each - 6		each + 2		each - 2		each 6		/		each 2		/	
Sie	+ 24						8		+ 24						/	

In Tournament Schafkopf the games won or lost in are scored in the form of points in a list; usually a small amount of money also changes hands, one point being worth a specified stake. There are two scoring systems: in the 'Plus/Minus' system both wins and losses are recorded. In the 'Plus Only' system only the points won are recorded.

Fundamentally the normal game (called a Rufspiel or Sauspiel) is worth 1 point and solo games are worth 2 (or even 4) points. In addition, Schneider and Schwarz each score an additional point. If a team has Matadors, these also score additional points. The maximum number of Matadors varies, depending on the rules, between 4 (only the Obers are counted) and 14 (all the trumps are counted).

The rules for Solo Schneider and Solo Schwarz may vary regionally; often the Solo also has a standard basic value, and schneider and schwarz are not paid out. Also the matadors are scored variably or even not at all in a Solo game. Likewise the scores for Solo Tout and Sie vary; schneider and schwarz are not counted in these cases, also the matadors often don’t count or are calculated at a flat rate.

=== Rounds and prizes ===
In Tournament Schafkopf there is usually a draw for two (or more) rounds of play with a fixed number of games divisible by four (often 32 or 40). At big tournaments there will also be knockout rounds and finals. The winner(s) receive hierarchical prizes of money or gifts funded by the entry fees. The player coming last, and sometimes the one coming second last too, may receive a consolation prize.

== Table points ==
In large tournaments, the 'position' of each player at his or her table is usually scored as well (i.e. the first-placed player at a table receives 40 additional points, the second-placed player 30, etc.). Often these 'table points' are much more important than the actual game points.

== Tournament series and championships ==
In the absence of a regular league, various tournament series have been established. The results of the participants are recorded in rankings and the best players are invited to a final tournament. One example is the Schafkopf Champions League run by the German Schafkopf Club (Deutscher Schafkopfverein) in Folmava/Vollmau. Meanwhile a number of unofficial championship tournaments with different systems of qualification have developed. The most important of these are probably the Bavarian Championship run by the Bavarian Schafkopf Club and the (unofficial) 'World Championship' which has been held every two years since 2001.

=== List of unofficial Schafkopf world champions ===
The following is a list of unofficial Schafkopf world champions:

No.	Year	Winner
1.	2001	Waldemar Schwägerl (Bärnau)
2.	2003 Hungary, Hévíz	
3.	2005 Czech Republic, Mariánské Lázně/Marienbad	Christoph Karl
4.	2007 Austria, Reith im Alpbachtal	
5.	2009 Austria, Großarl	Sabine Fischer (Lechbruck)
6.	2011 Austria, Großarl	Stefan Hobmeier (Neufahrn bei Freising)
7.	2013 Austria, Großarl	Hans Fenzl (Waldmünchen)
8.	2013 Austria, Großarl	Georg Leindecker (Bad Aibling)
9.	2017 Austria, Großarl	Herbert Gruber (Eggenfelden)
10.	2019 Germany, Cham	
