= Zole =

Card game from Latvia

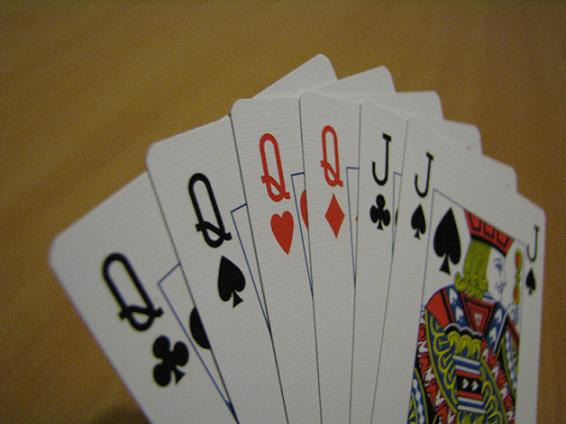
- Origin: Latvia
- Alternative names: Zolīte
- Type: Trick-taking
- Players: 3–5
- Age range: 18+
- Cards: 26
- Deck: Piquet, French
- Rank (high→low): Q J A 10 K 9 8 7
- Play: Clockwise

Related games
- Schafkopf

Zole (diminutive Zolīte) is a Latvian trick-taking cooperative card game for 3 to 5 players. The game belongs to the Schafkopf group of ace–ten games, i.e. jacks and queens are permanent trumps in the game. Zole is played using only 26 cards of a 32-card piquet deck or French-style deck, consisting of 36 cards. Six or ten cards are removed from the deck and left out of play. Official rules and terminology were published by the Latvian Zole Game Federation (LZSF) in 1996.

== Origin of the name ==
The game's name is derived from the Latvian word (Latvian: zole), meaning sole. The rules of Zole were originally published in Emanuel Lasker's book under the name Skat Rēvelīts and probably have Estonian origin.

== Playing deck ==
The Zolīte playing deck consists of all the aces, kings, queens, jacks, tens, and nines, plus the 8 of diamonds and 7 of diamonds. This gives a total of 26 cards. The queens, jacks and all diamonds are permanent trumps giving a total of 14 trumps. The queen of clubs is the strongest card in the deck followed in order of strength by the queen of spades and hearts and diamonds and then the jack of clubs, spades, hearts and diamonds and then the ace, ten, king, 9, 8, 7 of diamonds. The remaining 12 cards are suits of clubs, spades and hearts comprising in order of strength the ace, ten, king, and 9. All suits are of equal strength.

== Rules ==
Zole is usually played by 3 to 5 players, called zolemann, although only 3 zolemannes simultaneously take part in the play, one play against another two. The game is trick-based and commonly played for money. There is no time limit for the party, but duration of the turn limited to 1 minute.

If there are 4 players the dealer sits out the round while the remaining 3 play. If there are 5 players the dealer deals to the First, Second and Fourth player so the dealer and the Third player sit out the round. Traditionally they go for the drinks and snacks during this time. Importantly the players that sit out are on the side of the 2 players playing against the one player for scoring/payment purposes.

In the beginning of the game, the players draw one card each from the deck. The first dealer is the player who draws the strongest card from the pack with the Queen of clubs being the strongest. In the following hands, the player to the left of current dealer will become the next dealer.

The dealer shuffles the deck and gives it to the player on their right to cut. Traditionally the player cutting the pack places the cut portion closer to themselves as if inviting luck to come to them. After this, the cards are dealt in packets of four cards to each participant two times, starting with the player on the dealer's left, thus each player has 8 cards in total and 2 cards are left face down on the table.

After cards have been dealt, each player in turn, clockwise from the dealer, gets one chance to declare they will be Big (Latvian: Lielais) and play against the other two as a team or pass.

If any player declares themselves Lielais, the other two players are Small (Latvian: Mazie). Lielais chooses to either pick up the two cards on the table, adding them to their hand and then discarding two cards face down to their discard pile (scoring them at the end of the game), or give the cards unseen to the Mazie to add to their discard pile and score. If playing for cash, the latter option would usually give Lielais a better payout. A particularly bold player can also, when it is their turn to declare themselves Lielais, declare themselves Black (Latvian: Melnais), in which case the game is played the same way as if they had declared themselves Lielais and given the remaining two cards to the Mazie - but this can only be done if Melnais had not looked at their cards before declaring this. It is only done when playing for cash, and gives the maximum payouts.

The goal of each hand for Lielais is to collect the majority of the 120 total points available. Mazie win the hand if they get 60 points or more. Ace is worth 11 points, ten is worth 10, king is worth 4, queen is worth 3, jack is worth 2, and all other cards are worth zero. It's worth to note that 10 is stronger and of higher value than the king, in some computer variant of the game tens are marked as Ø.

If all players pass on the chance to be Lielais, each player plays for themselves in a Pass (Latvian: Galds) game. Tricks are played as normal, but the game itself plays the two remaining cards in the first two tricks (the game goes last in the first trick; if it took the first trick, it leads the second, and goes last otherwise). In this game mode, the objective is to avoid taking tricks, and the winner is whoever took the fewest tricks, with fewest points as a tiebreaker.

When it is a player's turn to declare themselves Lielais or pass, they can also choose to declare themselves Small Solo (Latvian: Mazais). This is different from being part of a team of two playing against Lielais. In this game mode one Mazais plays against two Bigs (Latvian: Lielie). Points are not counted, and Mazais wins if they play the whole game without taking any tricks.

Rank	Trump		Points
1	Queen of clubs	♣Q	3
2	Queen of spades	♠Q	3
3	Queen of hearts	♥Q	3
4	Queen of diamonds	♦Q	3
5	Jack of clubs	♣J	2
6	Jack of spades	♠J	2
7	Jack of hearts	♥J	2
8	Jack of diamonds	♦J	2
9	Ace of diamonds	♦A	11
10	Ten of diamonds	♦10	10
11	King of diamonds	♦K	4
12	Nine of diamonds	♦9	0
13	Eight of diamonds	♦8	0
14	Seven of diamonds	♦7	0

== See also ==
- Sheepshead (game)
- Doppelkopf
- Ombre

== Bibliography ==
- Kolbergs, Andris (1996), Zolīte Latvijā un pasaulē, Rīga, LV: Vērmaņparks, ISBN 9984-08-004-8
- Lasker, Emanuel (1991) [1931], Kāršu spēles, Rīga, LV: Atbalss, ISBN 5-89965-059-1
- Borisevičius, Albinas (2001), Pirmasis padalijimas, Vilnius, LT, ISBN 5-415-01463-2
- Kangeris, Kārlis (1977–1978), Magazine "Afišas", Munster, DE: Latvian gymnasium
