= Baśka =

Card game

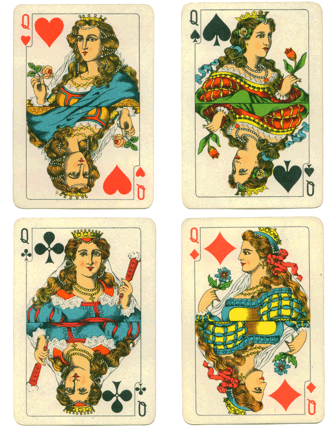
- Trumps 3 to 6: the four queens
- Origin: Germany
- Type: Point-trick
- Players: 4
- Cards: 16
- Deck: French
- Rank (high→low): Trumps: ♥A ♥10 ♣Q ♠Q ♥Q ♦Q ♣J ♠J ♥J ♦J ♦A ♦10; Side suits (♣ ♠): A 10
- Play: Clockwise

Related games
- German Schafkopf, kop

Baśka is a fast-moving, Polish card game for four players played using traditional French-suited playing cards. It uses a shortened pack of just 16 cards and is similar to kop which is also played in Poland. Both are derived from German Schafkopf.

== History ==
Like Skat and some other card games, the game is an offshoot of the German trick-taking game Schafkopf and has been played in Polish Kashubia since the 19th century. The region formerly had a large German-speaking population and both the play and terminology point to its German origins. The name "Baśka" is the diminutive form of Barbara and is also the name for a hand of four Queens, which is the highest bid in the game.

In 1962, a Kashubian Baedeker, tells readers that if you see "a group of players slapping down cards with gusto and shouts of 'Wedding' or 'Zolo'..." they will be Kashubian Baśka players. It goes on to say that, to understand the game it is better not to be a card player as everything is topsy turvy with Queens outranking Kings. This suggests it was once played with more cards (such as Kings) than is normal today.

In 1967 it was described as one of the main pastimes played on fishing boats along with Bridge, Skat, Pontoon and Poker. In 2017, it was reported that Franciszek Derra, the first Polish Baśka champion had died.

Today it is mainly played in Kashubia west of Gdańsk in Poland.

== Rules ==
=== Cards ===
As in kop, only the aces, tens, queens, and jacks of the four suits from a French pack are used, so there are only 16 cards in toto. The cards have the usual ace–ten values as in related games: ace = 11, 10 = 10, queen = 3 and jack = 2. The point total of all cards is 104 (in Skat and Schafkopf it is 120, since they include the kings).

All queens and jacks are trumps, however the highest trumps are the ace of hearts and the 10 of hearts and the lowest trumps are the ace of diamonds and 10 of diamonds. The suits rank in the order: clubs, spades, hearts and diamonds. So there are 12 trumps in total and only 4 cards in the two side suits, clubs and spades, which are not trumps.

Suit	Value
Trump	A♥ 10♥ Q♣ Q♠ Q♥ Q♦ J♣ J♠ J♥ J♦ A♦ 10♦
Clubs	A♣ 10♣
Spades	A♠ 10♠

=== Deal and auction ===
The normal game is played between four people in two pairs, each pair playing as partners. The pairs are determined by the two black Queens, the holders of these cards play together against the other two players. However, during the auction, players may bid to play solo instead. Deal and play are clockwise.

The dealer shuffles and, once the right-hand neighbour has cut, deals all 16 cards individually to the four players, so that each has four cards. The role of dealer rotates left after each game. When all players have their cards, they may bid in turn for various contracts. Possible calls are:

- Contra, Re etc. Announcing Contra doubles the game value. If answered with Re or Rej, the game value is redoubled. Further doubling calls are Bok and Hirsh. These are only valid if they alternate between the two sides but, since the partnerships are not certain at this point, this only becomes apparent once the auction is over. A series of two or more consecutive doublings by the same team only counts as a single doubling. In a private game, further doubling announcements can follow via the Słup (lit.: post, pole), which are then given imaginary names.
- Wedding (Wesele): a Wedding may be announced by a player with both black Queens who wishes to play in partnership with the player holding the highest Jack not held by the declarer.

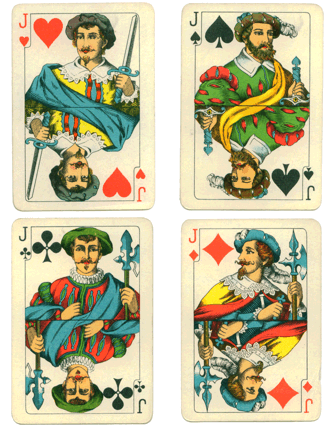
The top trumps in a Gran

- Gran: In a Gran, the player plays alone. As in Skat, the values of the games change so that only Jacks are trumps, the other cards being ranked in their suits.

Suit	Value
Trump	J♣ J♠ J♥ J♦
Clubs	A♣ 10♣ Q♣
Spades	A♠ 10♠ Q♠
Hearts	A♥ 10♥ Q♥
Diamonds	A♦ 10♦ Q♦

- Zolo is a soloist contract, the declarer playing alone against the three defenders.
- Gran Du is a Gran where the player must take all the tricks.
- Zolo Du is a Zolo in which the declarer intends to take all the tricks.
- Baśka: If a player has all four Queens, there is no play. The player wins automatically.

Only the highest bid counts. If any of these three calls are made, all previously called doublings are void, but may be made again thereafter in relation to the winning contract. Forehand (to dealer's left) opens the game. If no soloist bids are made and a Wedding is not announced, players play a normal game in which the usual partnerships apply.

=== Partnerships ===
Partnerships

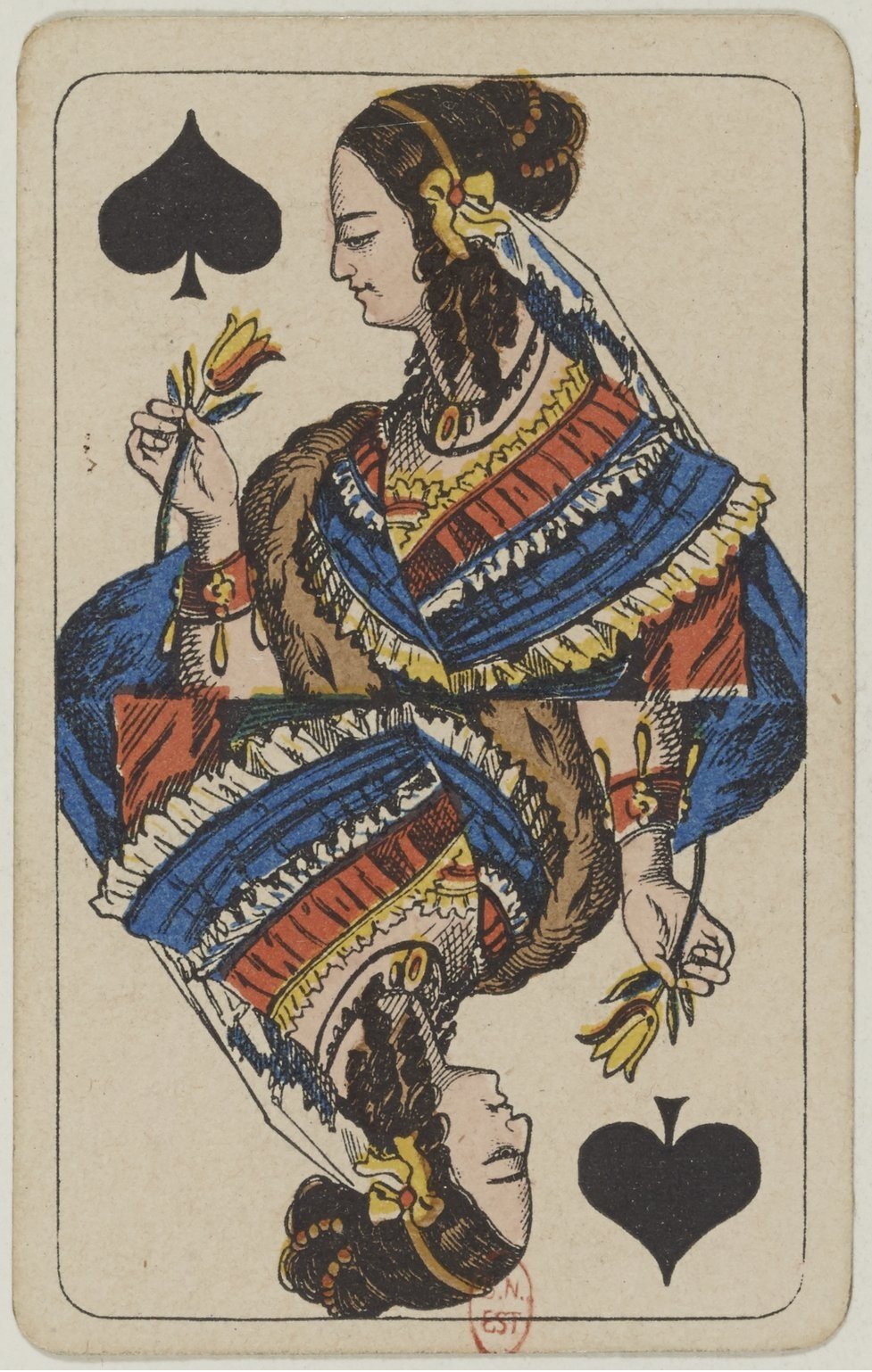
Queen of Spades

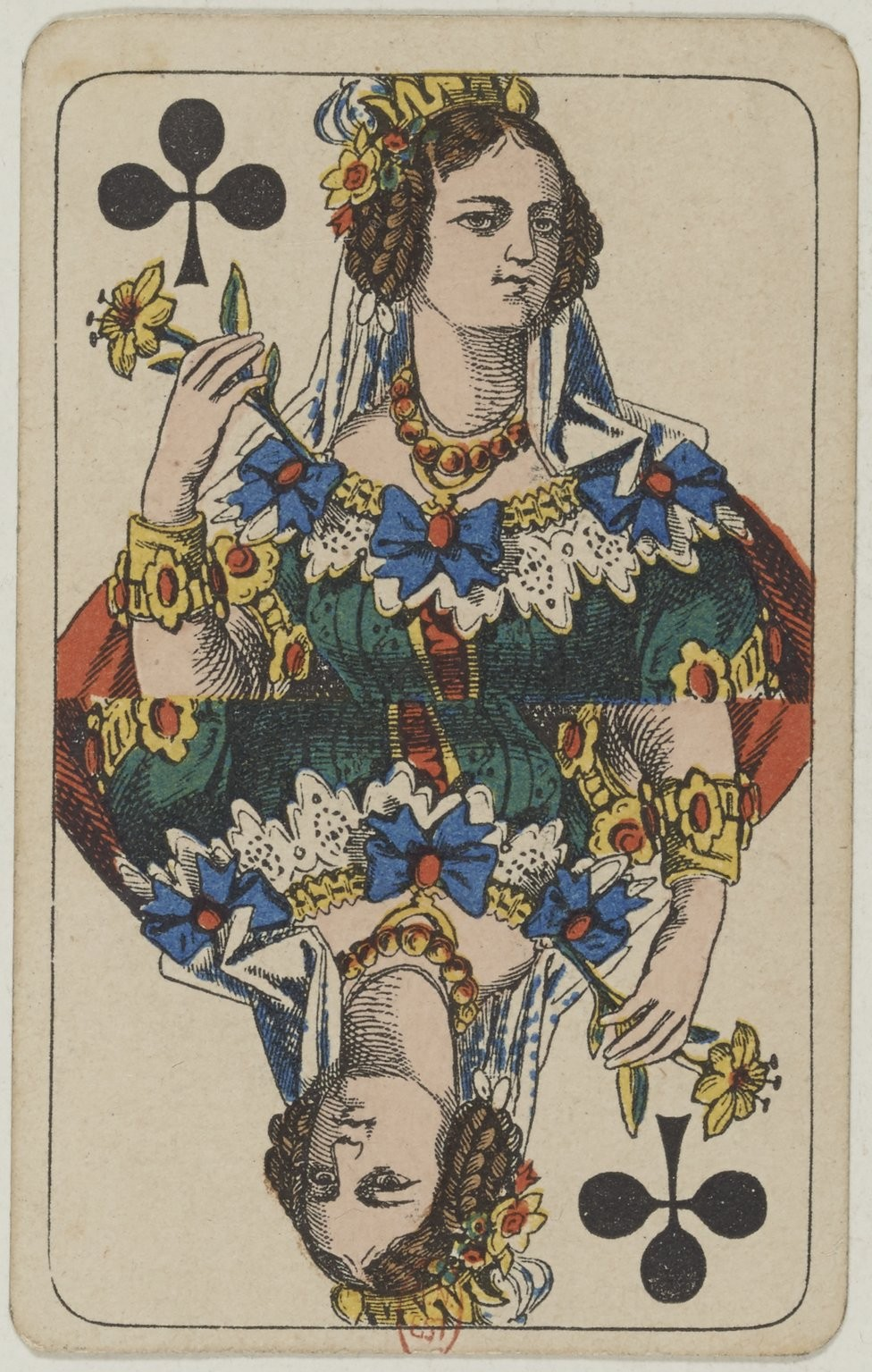
Queen of Clubs

The players with the 'Old Ones' form a team

If a player announces a Zolo or a Zolo Du, he plays alone against three defenders, in all other cases two players form a team. The formation of the teams depends on the distribution of the two Queens (Q♠ and Q♣); the two players who have these cards, the 'Old Ones', play as a team against the other two. A player with both black Queens in hand can play a Zolo or a Zolo Du or a Silent Zolo (Cicha), in which he plays alone without announcement and without the knowledge of the other players. Alternatively, he can announce "Wedding" and partner with the player who has the highest Jack not held by the declarer. Any player can play a "Gran" and a "Gran du", regardless of the distribution of Queens.

The partnerships do not become clearly known until the named cards are played, although this may be apparent sooner due to the play.

=== Play ===
Forehand (left of dealer) leads to the first trick. A trick is always won by the highest trump or, if no trump is played, the highest card of the suit led. The winner of the trick then plays the next card. Suit must be followed, all trumps counting as part of the trump suit regardless of their suit symbol) and players must trump if unable to follow. They must always overtake the highest card in the trick up to that point if they can. Only if a player cannot follow suit or trump, may any card be played.

Since there are only four tricks, a round of Baśka is played very quickly.

=== Scoring and settlement ===
The card points are counted and, in a normal game, Wedding, Silent Zolo, Gran or Zolo, the side with the most points wins i.e. the one with the majority of the 104 points or a score of at least 53. In the event of a tie (52 all), the team that bid the last double loses or, if none were announced, the declarer(s) lose. In a announced Zolo Du and Gran Du the declarer must take all the tricks or he loses, and in a Baśka the announcer automatically wins.

In a normal game or Wedding, the score is doubled if the losers made one or more tricks but scored 25 or fewer; the game is tripled if the losers made no tricks.

If the 'old' players lose a normal game or Wedding they lose double; likewise if the soloist loses, the game is trebled.

Of course, in addition, all valid doubling counts as well. In a money game, points are converted into monetary amounts, which are then paid by the losers to the winners.

== Literature ==
- Ostrowska Róża and Izabella Trojanowska (1962) Bedeker Kaszubski. Wydawn. Morskie.
- Zachodni Institute (1967). Ziemie zachodnie: Studia i materiały, Issue 10. Instytut Zachodni.
