= Bierkopf =

Trick-taking card game

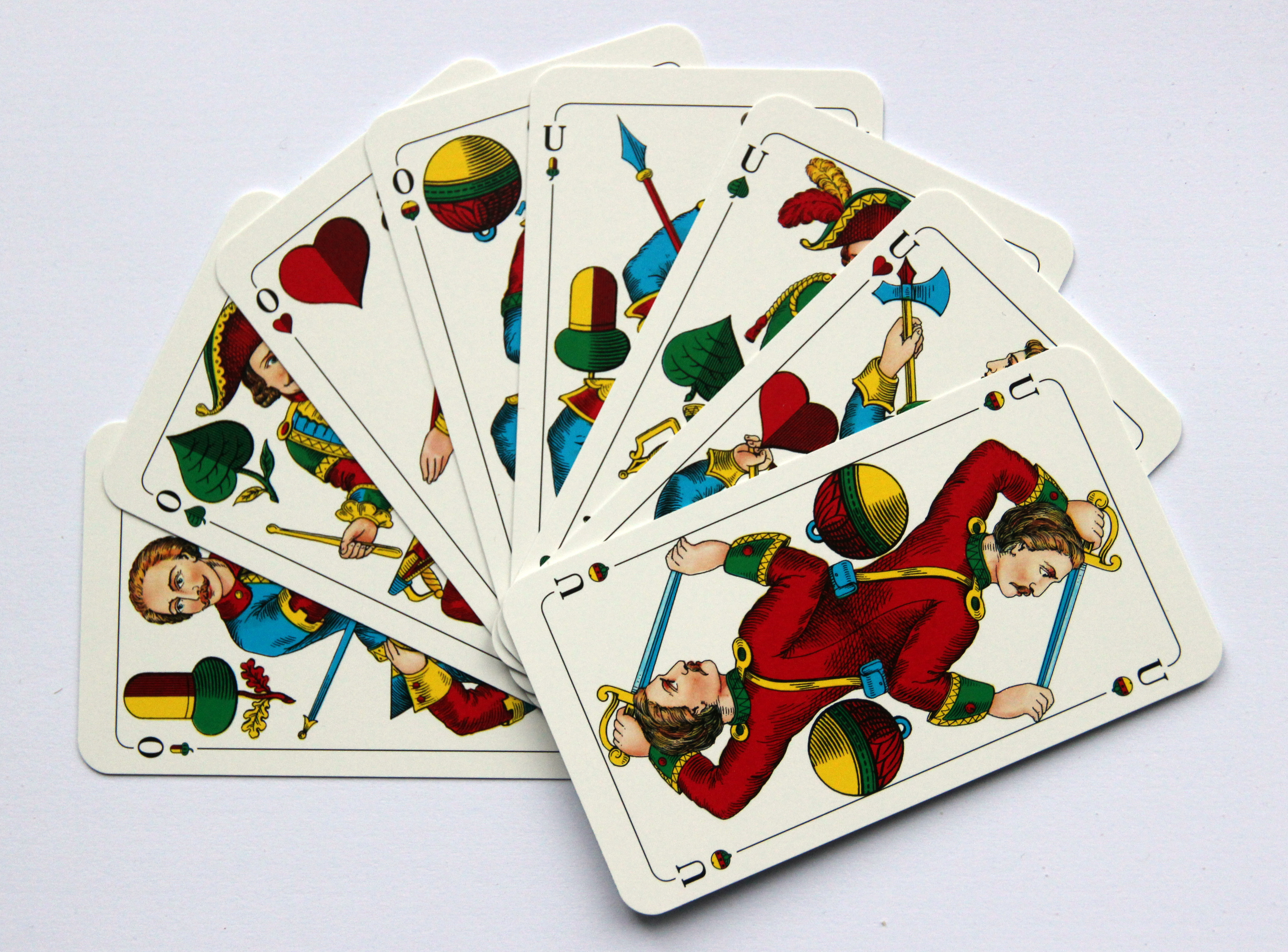
- The top trumps in Bierkopf - Obers and Unters
- Origin: Franconia
- Type: Point-trick
- Players: 4
- Age range: 18+
- Cards: 24
- Deck: German
- Rank (high→low): A 10 K O U
- Play: Clockwise

Related games
- Schafkopf • Blattla • Mucken

Bierkopf ("beer-head") is a trick-taking ace–ten card game for 4 players, played in fixed partnerships. It is a simple version of the Bavarian national game of Schafkopf that is played in Franconia (northern Bavaria) and usually for litre-glasses of beer. It is especially popular in the area of Bamberg. The game is popular enough for regular tournaments to be held.

Bierkopf is recorded being played in Franconia just before the Second World War. It is described as a four-hand partnership game played for penalty points called Bolln represented by a blob on the slate, each one "formerly usually worth 1 or even 2 pints [of beer]." At that time a side hoping to take all tricks could announce a Bucher, which is no longer a feature of the modern game.

== Overview ==
The rules of Bierkopf are similar to those of its more widely known cousin, Schafkopf, but simpler. Bierkopf is always played by four players organised into two permanent teams of two; the partners sit opposite one another. The positions taken by the players before the start are decided with the aid of the cards used for the game.

The game is mainly played in the Franconian part of Bavaria and is sufficiently well known for tournaments to be held and for it to be played at games nights in sports clubs.

== Aim ==
Bierkopf is a point-trick game, so the aim is to win as many card points as possible through taking tricks.

== Cards ==
A Bavarian pattern, German-suited pack is used. From the usual 36-card Schafkopf pack, the nines, eights, sevens and sixes (the 'nixers') are removed. In some regions, the nines are retained and this is referred to as 'long Bierkopf' (langer Bierkopf).

Unlike Schafkopf, in Bierkopf the ranking of trumps is always the same: the 4 Obers, the 4 Unters and then the 3 remaining heart cards. The trumps, from highest to lowest are:

- O – Ober of acorns (Eichelober), the "old man" (der Alte)
- O – Ober of leaves (Blattober), the "blue man" (der Blaue)
- O – Ober of hearts (Herzober), the "red man" (der Rote)
- O – Ober of bells (Schellober), the "ball" (der Bogel)
- U – Unter of acorns (Eichelunter)
- U – Unter of leaves (Blattunter)
- U – Unter of hearts (Herzunter)
- U – Unter of bells (Schellunter)
- A – Sow/ace of hearts (Herzas)
- 10 – Ten of hearts (Herzzehn)
- K – King of hearts (Herzkönig)

The rank of cards in the plain suits is: Sow/ace > ten > king.

The card values are as follows:

- Sow = 11 points
- Ten = 10 points
- King = 4 points
- Ober = 3 points
- Unter = 2 points

There are thus 120 points in play.

== Playing ==
=== Partners ===
The remaining 20 cards are shuffled and the dealer hands them round individually, face up, until a Sow (marked with an "A" and sometimes, misleadingly called an ace) appears. That player stays where he is. The other three continue to receive cards until the second Sow turns up. The player with the second Sow is the partner of the player with the first Sow and, if necessary, moves places to sit opposite. The two players who did not receive Sows form the second partnership and take the remaining places at the card table (Kardeltisch).

=== Dealing ===
The player with the first Sow (there are other variants) now shuffles the cards and offers them to rearhand, the player to his right, to cut. Rearhand cuts as often as he wants to. The dealer then deals a packet of 3 cards and then a packet of 2 to each player, the cards being dealt in clockwise order and face down.

=== Bidding ===
Forehand, the player left of the dealer, briefly confers with his partner before play begins. They may not discuss which cards they have, but only how well they are able to help one other depending on whether they have a good hand, indifferent or poor hand. At this point they may announce a schuss or spritze which doubles the winnings. If they decide not to double, the opposing team may now confer. But they may only say whether they can help or not help. If either team announces spritze, the other team may announce a retoure after the 2nd card has been played to the table. This doubles the game value again. The retoure may be further raised and, theoretically, this may continue until the winnings would be enough to erase all the remaining lines on the beermat. If neither of the first two players calls a spritze, player 3 has the opportunity to raise the stakes with his partner. If he doesn't raise the stakes, the last player at the table makes an announcement in accordance with a Bierkopf 'code of honour'. This is declared with the words "weil mer hinter hocken" ("because I sit at the back") or "an anzer mach mer net" ("do not reply to me"), whereupon no retoures may be announced. Otherwise, after each doubling and after the second card has been played, retoures may be declared.

=== Trick-taking ===
Forehand leads to the first trick. Players must follow suit (Farbzwang) if possible; failing that they must play a trump (Trumpfzwang) if they have one. If they have neither a card of the led suit nor a trump, they may throw in any card. The winner of the trick leads to the next one. Tricks are picked up by the winning team and placed face down on the table. Players may always look at their own tricks, but you can only ask to see the last trick of your opponents.

== Scoring ==
A game is called a Bollen and consists of 21 game points. At the start of the game, the teams each mark 21 lines (i.e. | | | | | | | | etc.) on a spare beermat (Deckel) representing the game points to be won. The team that wins more than half the card points in each deal (i.e. more than 60) wins that particular hand and erases or cross out one of its lines. If the losers fail to reach 30 points, they are schneider and the winners may erase 2 lines. If the winners take all the tricks - known as schwarz - they may erase 3 lines. Usually, however, the stakes have been doubled by a so-called schuss or spritze and the winners may then erase 2, 4 or 6 lines respectively. If stakes have been quadrupled the game points that may be erased increase accordingly.

As soon as a team has erased all 21 lines from its beermat, it has won the Bollen. This means that the other team must pay for a Maß (2 pints) of beer. To record this a blob is made on the losers' beermat.

== In popular culture ==
In the crime thriller, Kontra, Re, und Tot, by Dieter Wirth, the crime scene is the Bierkopf card table in the local pub. As four friends play Bierkopf, one of them mysteriously falls dead at the table before he can respond to a call of Re ("redouble"). The novel includes the rules of Bierkopf at the end.

== See also ==
- Mucken
- Schafkopf language

== Literature ==
- Wirth, Dieter (2017). Der Nymphensittich kennt den Mörder Provinz Krimi aus Franken [Double, Redouble and Dead: Leo Spritzer and Hansi Kurzer - the Second Case]. München: BookRix. ISBN 978-3-7396-2932-2.
