= Kop (card game) =

Polish card game

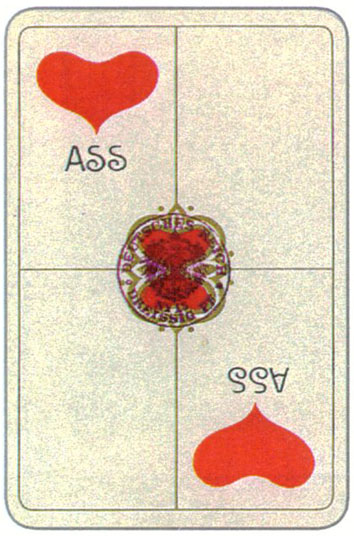
- The commanding card in Kop
- Origin: Germany
- Type: Point-trick
- Players: 4
- Cards: 16
- Deck: French
- Rank (high→low): Trumps: ♥A ♣10 ♠10 ♥10 ♣Q ♠Q ♥Q ♦Q ♣J ♠J ♥J ♦J ♦A ♦10; Side suits (♣ ♠): A only
- Play: Clockwise

Related games
- German Schafkopf, Baśka

Kop is a minimalist Polish card game of the Schafkopf family for four players played using traditional French-suited playing cards. It uses a shortened pack of just 16 cards and is similar to Baśka, another fast moving Polish game. Both are derived from German Schafkopf.

== Origin and distribution ==
Kop is played in the province of Greater Poland, once part of Prussia as the Grand Duchy of Posen, hence the German influence on the game. Its name is derived from the German word Kopf, itself an abbreviation of Schafkopf, the ancestor of this family of games. (Note: See for example Beilage zum Rendsburger Wochenblatt, Nr. 50, 29 April 1887: "Ja, heute haben wir auch Kopp (Schafkopf) gespielt".) The game is very fast moving and usually played for money. It is played by inter alia by rail commuters and cab drivers. Regional and village Kop tournaments are held. It is especially popular in Wolsztyn County where it has experienced a revival since 2006 when the first open tournament was held.

== Rules ==
The following description is based primarily on the Wolsztyn rules supplemented by other sources where indicated:

=== Cards ===
A 16-card French-suited pack pack is used with only the aces, queens, jacks and tens of each suit. Trumps rank in the following order: ♥A ♣10 ♠10 ♥10 ♣Q ♠Q ♥Q ♦Q ♣J ♠J ♥J ♦J ♦A ♦10. This leaves only two side suit cards: ♣A and ♠A. Cards have point values following the standard ace–ten system.

=== Deal ===
The first dealer is chosen by lot; thereafter the deal rotates to the left. Dealer shuffles and offers the pack to the right for cutting before dealing four rounds of 1 card each beginning with forehand to the left of the dealer.

=== Auction ===
Forehand opens a multi-round auction in which players "pass", bid or double. The possible contracts in ascending order are: Wedding, Zolo ("Solo") and Zolo Du ("Solo Tout"). Players must overcall an earlier bid or pass. In addition players may call a double against an opposing bid. There are four doubling calls which, in ascending order, are: "Contra", "Re", "Bock" and "Sup" (Kontra, Rej, Bok and Słup). Each one doubles or redoubles the game value. In soloist contracts, the soloist may not double first. If a bid is overcalled, all doubles to that point are annulled. The auction ends if all pass or if after a bid and three passes.

==== Contracts ====
The contracts are:

- Solo Tout (Zolo Du). The declarer plays alone and must take all 4 tricks.
- Solo (Zolo). The declarer plays alone and undertakes to take at least 53 of the 104 points in the game.
- Wedding (Wesele). The declarer has ♣Q and ♠Q and will partner with the player with the highest Jack not held, the Jacks ranking in their trump suit order. The partner is only revealed during play.
- Silent Solo (Cicha). This is not bid, but only revealed during the game when it turns out that the player has both Queens.
- Normal game (Gra zwyczajna). If no-one bids a contract and there is no silent game, the players with the black queens – ♣Q and ♠Q – form a team (the "Old Ones") against the defenders (the "Young Ones"). This pairing is only revealed during play.

=== Play ===
Forehand leads with any card. Players must overtake if they can, either by trumping a side suit Ace or, more usually, by playing a higher trump. Only if a player has no trumps may a side suit Ace be discarded. The trick is won by the highest trump and the trick winner leads to the next.

Players places their tricks face down in front of them and they may not be looked at until the end of the hand.

=== Scoring ===
A Solo Tout is won if the declarer takes all 4 tricks, otherwise it is lost. All other games are won with 53 points or more. In partnership games, the partners combine their points. A team scoring 25 or fewer points loses double and a team taking no tricks in a normal game loses triple.

The basic game values are:

- Normal game: 1 game point
- Normal game won double: 2
- Normal game won triple: 3
- Silent Solo: 4
- Solo: 5
- Solo Tout: 10

The above values are doubled for every double call that was made against that contract during the auction. However, Bok and Slup may not be called against a Solo or Solo Tout and a Slup may not be called against a Silent Solo.

== Variations ==
In the Greater Poland Kop League there is an honorary game called "Kop" which is awarded without play to a player dealt all four 10s. Scoring in a normal game is as above, but the points awarded for solo games are as follows:

- Silent: 12
- Solo: 15
- Solo Tout: 30
- Kop: 30

A maximum of three doubles is allowed in normal games (Contra, Re, Bock). There is no Bock in a Silent or Solo game and no Re in a Solo Tout. There is no doubling in Kop as it is won immediately.

== Literature ==
- Zachodni Institute (1967). Ziemie zachodnie: Studia i materiały, Issue 10. Instytut Zachodni.
