= Mucken =

Card game

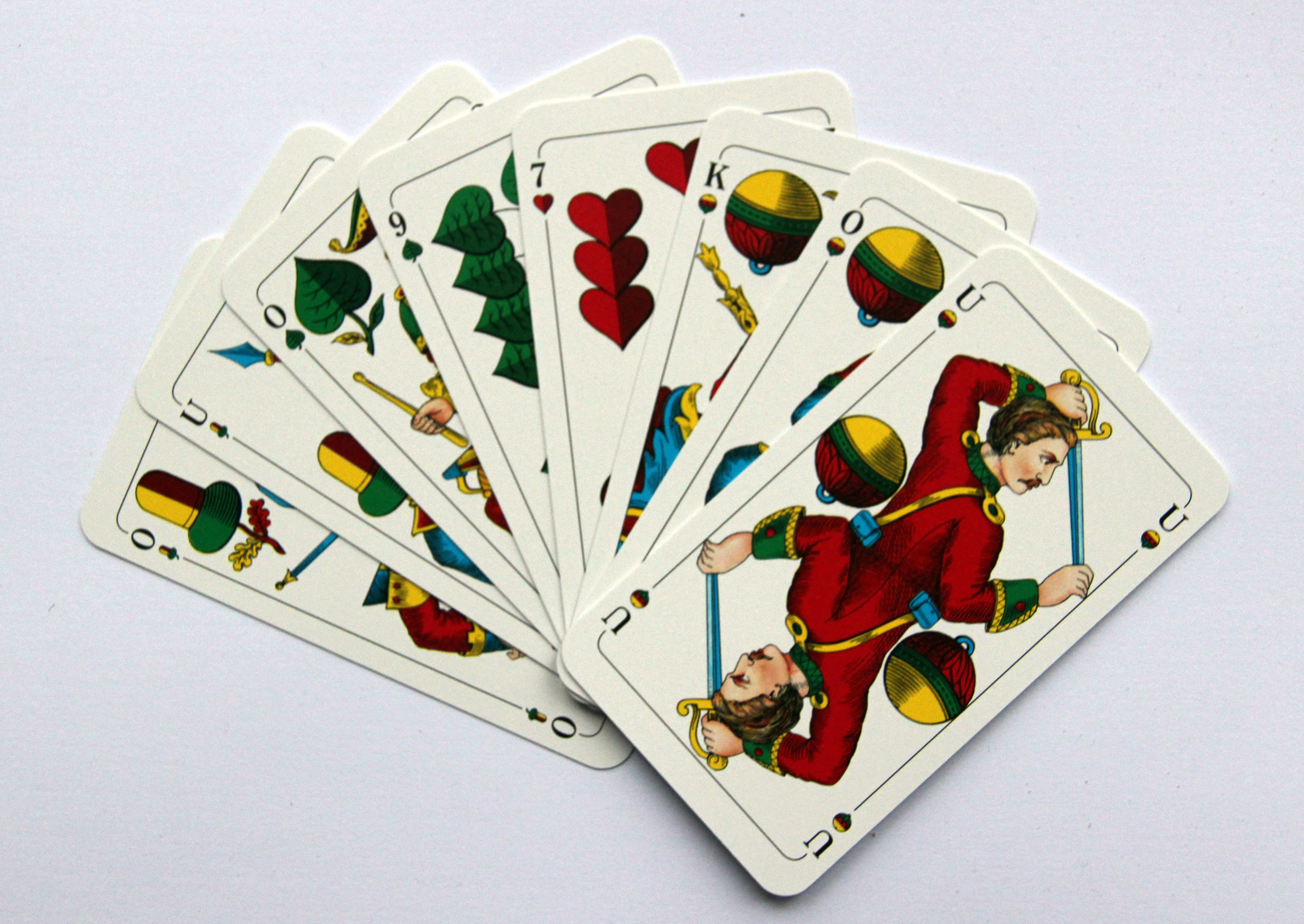
- Typical Mucken hand using Franconian-pattern cards
- Origin: Franconia, Germany
- Type: Point-trick
- Players: 4
- Cards: 24 or 32
- Deck: German, Bavarian or Franconian pattern

Related games
- Bavarian Schafkopf, Bierkopf, German Schafkopf

Mucken or Muck is a variation of the popular German card game Schafkopf. However, unlike Schafkopf, it must always be played in teams of two players, so there are no soloist or Rufer ("caller") contracts. Mucken is mainly found in the province of Upper Franconia in the German state of Bavaria. Mucken is often played in Franconian restaurants, as it is part of the Franconian pub culture. The details of the rules vary greatly, even from village to village.

== Distribution ==
Mucken is primarily a Franconian game and appears to be a development of Bierkopf, itself a simplification of the Bavarian national game of Schafkopf. As well as being a pub game in Franconia, tournaments are also regularly organised such as the Muck Championship in Hof.

== Cards ==
Mucken is usually played with a short deck of Bavarian pattern playing cards (24 cards). Occasionally Franconian pattern cards and/or a long deck (32 cards) are also used.

== Aim ==
As in Schafkopf, the aim is to score a certain number of points by winning tricks (stechen) or by drawing cards (ziehen). Normally the declaring soloist or team achieves a 'simple win' with 61 points (Augen); a 'win with schneider' with 91 points and a 'win with schwarz' if all six (or eight) tricks are taken (also called a Tout or Aufstand). With 31 points a player or team is out of schneider or schneiderfrei. If schneider is declared, the defending team only have to score 30 points. If schwarz is announced they only have to take one trick (irrespective of its card points) in order to win.

Declarer result	Declarer points	Defending team points	Defending team result
win with schwarz	all tricks taken	no trick taken	loss with schwarz
win with schneider	91-120 points	0-29 points	loss with schneider
simple win	61-90 points	30-59 points	simple loss
simple loss	31-60 points	60-89 points	simple win
loss with schneider	0-30 points	90-120 points	win with schneider
lost with schwarz	no trick taken	all tricks taken	won with schwarz

== Playing ==
=== Shuffling, cutting and dealing ===
The dealer shuffles the cards, lets the player to his right cut them and then deals them clockwise in two packets of three cards, starting with the player on his left, the forehand (Vorhand or erster Mann). Forehand leads to the first trick. The role of dealer rotates in a clockwise direction. Four hands make a 'round' (Runde).

In cutting, at least 3 cards should be cut or left behind. The pack may be cut up to three times.

Instead of cutting, the cutter may 'knock' on the cards (geklopft) and may then ask the dealer to deal the cards in a different way - for example, "all six" (alle sechs) means dealing all six cards at once; and "anti-clockwise" (entgegen dem Uhrzeigersinn) means dealing in the opposite direction to normal.

The rules on cutting, knocking and dealing the cards vary markedly from one region to another. In tournaments (Muckturnieren) there are sometimes stricter rules such as: 'no knocking', always and only cutting three cards and always dealing two packets of three cards.

=== Contracts ===
Game type	Contract
Sie
Tout games	Muck Tout
Tout games	Geier Tout
Tout games	Wenz Tout
Schneider games	Schneidermuck
Schneider games	Schneidergeier
Schneider games	Schneiderwenz
Normal games	Muck
Normal games	Geier
Normal games	Wenz
Ramsch

Before the actual game starts, there is an auction (Spielansage) to determine who will be the declarer and which contract will be played (see below). Forehand has the first opportunity to bid for a contract by saying "play" (Ich würde spielen) or "pass" (Ich bin weg or weiter). After that, bidding passes to the next player in a clockwise direction, etc., until it reaches the dealer who is last to bid.

Once a contract has been bid, the following players may raise it by announcing a higher-ranking contract, "Me too" (Ich spiele auch); the first player may now raise the bid again, whereby the game would return to him. Where two or more players place bids of equal rank, the seating order is the decider.

The ranking of the individual contracts is determined before the start of the game. A common variant is shown in the table opposite. Another alternative is to rank Geier higher than Wenz. Occasionally only Wenz and Muck are allowed.

=== Kontra, Re, Sup and Hirsch ===
Depending on the rules agreed, a member of the defending team may double the game value by declaring "Kontra!" (= "double") before or as the first card is played if they think that the declarer's team cannot win. This doubles the value of the game.

The usual practice is for the defending team to take over the game, i.e. they now need 61 card points to win - Kontra takes over.

The double can be rejected by the declarer or his partner with a Re(tour) (counter-attack), which doubles the value of the game again. The game value may be doubled further by declaring Sup and Hirsch.

=== All pass ===
If all players pass, i.e. none wishes to declare a contract, there are various options that have to be pre-agreed:

- the hands are thrown in, re-shuffled by the next dealer in a clockwise direction and re-dealt. Often the following hand (occasional the entire following round) is played as a Bockspiel, in which game values are doubled
- another option is to play a Ramsch
- Sometimes a Muss game is usual; that is the player who holds the Old Man (the O i.e. the highest trump) has to declare a contract
- Another option is Mucken for One Point (Mucken um einen Punkt), whereby e.g. the team with the Old Man has to score 61 points. In Mucken for one point there is only one game point to be won even if the game ends in schneider or schwarz.

=== Tricks ===
When the game is announced, the opening player (to the left of the dealer) plays the first card; then the other players follow in clockwise order, one by one. Once there are four cards on the table, it is decided which player has won the trick. The winner takes the four cards and leads to the next trick and so on, until all 24 cards, corresponding to 6 tricks, have been played (or 8 tricks for a long deck).

Depending on the type of card played, a distinction is made between suit tricks and trump tricks. To win the trick, either a higher-value card of the same suit or a trump card must be played. If a trump is already in the trick, it can only be trumped by a higher trump. Heading the trick with a higher value card or trump is not mandatory (i.e. there is no Stichzwang), but players must follow suit (Farbzwang or Bedienpflicht). If a player is unable to follow suit, he can either trump it or discard (i.e. there is no Trumpfzwang)

Failing to follow suit, playing too soon or verbally influencing the play will generally result in the loss of the game. If a trick is not yet completed (i.e. the cards are still face up on the table), each player has the right to see the last trick on request.

=== Scoring ===
==== Card values ====
Cards	Symbol	Card points (Augen)
Sow (Sau) / Deuce (Daus)	A	11
Ten (Zehn)	10	10
King (König)	K	4
Ober (Ober/Bauer)	O	3
Unter (Unter/Wenz)	U	2
Nine (Neun)	9	0

After the game the cards won are scored.

The card points of the cards are the same as in Schafkopf.

There are 5 cards in each suit (i.e. 20 in total) with associated card points (Augen). Each suit has a total of 30 card points; in all there are thus 120 card points to be shared out.

==== Winning ====
During the game announcement it will be declared how many card points the declarer must score to win the game (see also Schneider and Tout)

==== Scoring ====
Contract	Game Value
Normal game (Normalspiel)	2
Normal game with Schneider	3
Schneider	7
Tout	10

Unlike Schafkopf points are not awarded to or deducted from each player. Instead, teams compete to be the first to score a pre-defined number of points (usually 21, less often 31). Only the winning team is awarded points; no points are deducted from the losing team. The first team to reach the target wins the entire round.

Double, Re, Sup and Hirsch each double the score of the game. Even after a Ramsch or the throwing in and re-dealing of cards, the score is often doubled.

Regionally, a round is also called Bobbl. The Bobbl (a large dot) is painted behind the score on the losing team, so it "gets" the Bobbl, while the other team "wins" the Bobbl. Sometimes when losing with no points, the Bobbl is expanded to a double Bobbl, which is then displayed graphically as "glasses" (with or without effect on the game score).

Sometimes a Hänger is also played as a round. This consists of two or three Bobbls. To win the Hänger you have to win two Bobbls. If one is won and one is lost, then there is the third "deciding" Bobbl.

== Contracts ==
Which contracts are played and in which order is determined between the players before the start of the game.

The biggest difference between Schafkopf and Mucken is that Mucken is always played as a team. No solos or caller games can be played.

The diagonally facing players always play together in a team. In a 6-player game, players play together in a "V" shape so that no two players from the same team sit next to each other.

=== Standard contracts ===
==== Wenz ====
Wenz
Trumps
U U U U
Suits
Acorns (Eichel)	Leaves (Gras/Grün)	Hearts (Herz)	Bells (Schellen)
A 10 K O 9	A 10 K O 9	A 10 K O 9	A 10 K O 9

In Wenz there are only four trumps, namely the Unters or Wenzen which rank in the order: Acorns (Eichel), Leaves (Gras/Grün), Hearts (Herz )and Bells (Schellen). The Ober is ranked within its suits between the King and the Nine. Hearts is a plain suit.

==== Geier ====
Geier
Trumps
O O O O
Suits
Acorns (Eichel)	Leaves (Gras/Grün)	Hearts (Herz)	Bells (Schellen)
A 10 K U 9	A 10 K U 9	A 10 K U 9	A 10 K U 9

Geier is like Wenz, but with the Obers as trumps instead of the Unters. Sometimes Geier is not used and players just play Wenz and Muck.

==== Muck ====
Muck
Trumps
O O O O U U U U A 10 K 9
Suits
Acorns (Eichel)	Leaves (Gras/Grün)	Bells (Schellen)
A 10 K 9	A 10 K 9	A 10 K 9

Muck corresponds to a Heart Solo in Schafkopf, with the difference that it is played in teams. The Obers, Unters and all Hearts cards are trumps. Some rules allow a Suit Muck i.e. a player may declare a Muck with another suit as trumps e.g. an Acorn, Leaf or Bell Muck.

=== Special forms ===
==== Ramsch ====
Ramsch is a variation of the game if no game announcement has taken place. Often the last player has the option of announcing Ramsch if the players before him have all passed.

The same trumps apply as for Muck, but the aim is to score as few card points as possible. The team with the most card points loses.

If the teams have the same number of points, the team with the most tricks loses. If the number of tricks is also equal, the team with the most trumps loses; if this number is also equal, the team with the higher trump loses. From the rules of Skat, is the March (Durchmarsch), i.e. one player takes every trick and wins the game.

In Ramsch, it is often compulsory to take the trick if you can (Stichzwang), i.e. a player who has the choice, for example, follow suit or to head with a trump must do so.

Ramsch often scores double.

==== Muss ====
Muss is a common variant in case all four players pass. It is essentially a 'force' in which all players must play. In this case, the owner of a particular card (almost always the Ober of Acorns) has to become the declarer. Muss has some special features: the game is considered won with 60 card points and Schneider-free at 30 card points (correspondingly to a win with 90 points as a Schneider). Also, no Kontra may be bid.

=== Schneider, Tout and Sie ===
The Schneider games are higher-scoring forms of the standard games. "Tout" or "Uprising" (Aufstand) or "Black" (Schwarz) games are more valuable than Schneider games. The words "Tout" (French: everything) and "Du" are used synonymously, because the (incorrect) pronunciation of "Tout" in Bavaria/Franconia sounds like "Du".

For example, a player who has bid Wenz, but is outbid by an opponent who calls Geier, can play a Schneider Wenz. If the other player raises to a Schneider Geier, the player can play a Wenz Tout.

In Schneider games, the declarer is predicting that the other team will not be "Schneider-free", i.e. will not score more than 30 points.

In the Tout games the declarer undertakes that his team will take every trick. This would include a trick with four Nines, even though it does not contain any points. If the opposing team takes this trick, the Tout game would be lost.

Regionally, a further option is Sie: This is the highest scoring contract in Mucken and is achieved when a player captures all four Obers and the two highest Unters. The origin of the name is unclear, probably a mistranslation of Tout ("you"). It is the only game that does not have to be played according to the rules and in which the playing cards are placed on the table immediately after the deal. A Sie is not often declared. In many Bavarian pubs, this is acknowledged by the custom of no longer using the cards, but framing them and hanging them on the wall with the date and the name of the player.

There are also regional differences. For example, if "Wenz over Muck" is played, a "Muck Tout" is lower than a "Wenz Tout", so that there is no Sie or corresponding rule.
