= Schafkopf =

German trick-taking card game

- "The supreme discipline of Bavarian card games"
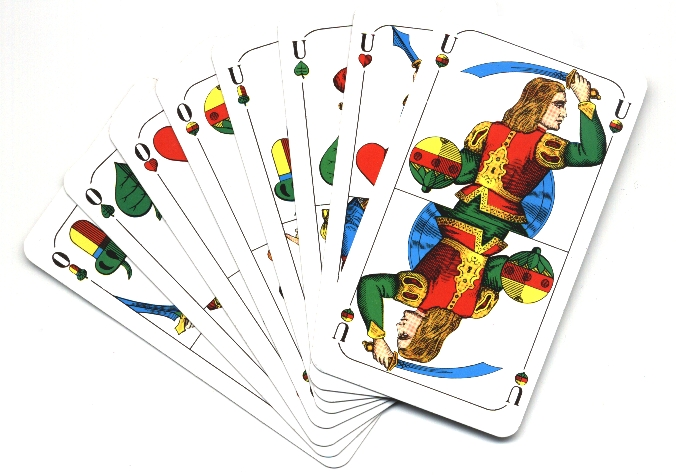
- The Obers and Unters – permanent top trumps
- Origin: Germany
- Type: Point-trick
- Players: 4
- Skills: Tactics & strategy
- Cards: 32
- Deck: German
- Rank (high→low): O O O O U U U U A 10 K 9 8 7 (Solo/Rufer Trump, is always trump in the latter) A 10 K 9 8 7 (Rufer/Solo Side); U U U U (Wenz Trump) A 10 K O 9 8 7 (Wenz Side)
- Play: Clockwise
- Playing time: 5 min/deal 20 min/round
- Chance: Medium

Related games
- Bierkopf • German Schafkopf • Mucken

Schafkopf (German: [ˈʃaːfkɔpf], lit. 'sheep's head'), also called Bavarian Schafkopf, is a popular German trick-taking card game of the ace–ten family for four players that evolved, towards the end of the 19th century, from German Schafkopf. It is still very popular in Bavaria, where it is their national card game played by around two million people, but it also played elsewhere in Germany and in Austria. It is an official cultural asset and important part of the Old Bavarian and Franconian way of life. Schafkopf is a mentally demanding pastime that is considered "the supreme discipline of Bavarian card games" and "the mother of all trump games."

Its closest relatives are Doppelkopf and Skat. These three and the North American game of Sheepshead descend from an earlier game, also called Schafkopf, with influences from Solo which, in turn, is the German version of Quadrille. The earliest written reference to the earlier form of Schafkopf – now known as German Schafkopf – dates to 1780, although it only came to notice through the polite society of Altenburg in 1811. Some kind of Schafkopf was current in Franconia (northern Bavaria) in the first half of the 19th century, but the distinct Bavarian form of the game is only positively recorded from 1879, since when it has become the dominant form, whereas German Schafkopf is only played in a number of local variants, for example, in the Palatinate as Alte Schoofkopp or Bauernstoss. Bierkopf and Mucken are simple variants which make a useful introduction to the more complex Schafkopf.

The first official rules were established by the Bavarian Schafkopf Club (Bayerischer Schafkopf-Verein) in 1989. These were revised by the School of Schafkopf (Schafkopfschule) and form guidelines for the detail of the game and the conduct of the players. However, unlike Skat, Schafkopf is not really seen as a sport, but purely as a leisure activity. As a result, a large number of traditional rules and variants are used in private games, which can vary considerably from region to region. These common forms of the game are referred to as 'impure' Schafkopf (unreiner Schafkopf) in contrast with 'pure' or standard Schafkopf which is played in tournaments. The name is sometimes spelt Schaffkopf,(German: [ˈʃafkɔpf]) Schafkopfen or, historically, Schaafkopf, and in north Germany in the Low German dialect: Schaapskopp or Kopp. To play Schafkopf is Schafkopfen and players may be called Schafkopfer.

== History ==
=== Etymology ===
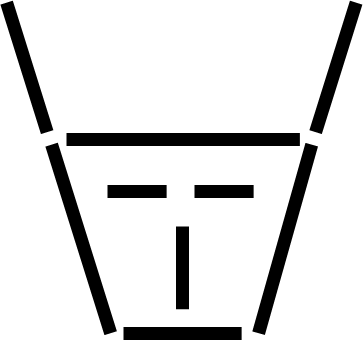
Traditional Schafkopf scoring system

There are various theories about the origin of the name Schafkopf, most of which come from traditional folklore. One suggestion is that Schafkopf acquired its name at a time when it was played for up to nine or twelve points which were marked with a piece of chalk as lines on a board, gradually forming the stylized appearance of a sheep's head (German: Schaf = sheep, Kopf = head). However, evidence of such notation is not found in the Bavarian context where it was invariably played for money.

Until the late 1960s, the alternative spelling Schaffkopf was not uncommon in Bavaria as an alternative spelling for Schafkopf; (Note: In both senses: the sheep's head and the game.) the ensuing discussion about the supposedly only correct form and its origin was the subject of extensive debate at that time - among other things in the columns of the Bavarian press - before the common variant Schafkopf became widely accepted from about 1970. However, it was not a new argument. In 1862, the family monthly, Deutsches Magazin, claimed that Schaffkopf "did not bear the unaesthetic name Schafkopf ["sheep's head"], which it is frequently called today as if to imply that playing it only required the level of mental ability which wise nature bestows on a dumb animal in our pastures; on the contrary it is the game that "creates intelligence" by giving all those who have had little education the opportunity to learn about combination theory and probability."

The issue was largely forgotten when author Wolfgang Peschel argued in the early 1990s for the double 'f' spelling based on the popular traditional view that, in earlier times, the game was supposed to have been played (geklopft) on the lids (Köpfen) of barrels (Upper German: Schaff, cf. Schäffler/Scheffel). To this day, such casks are used as tables at beer stands and beer halls. Although this hypothesis is unanimously rejected by experts and there is no evidence for it in older sources, it is widespread on the Internet.

Another theory, which dates to the mid-19th century, is that it comes from "Schaffen" and "Kopf", "to work one's brain".

=== Forerunners ===
The indirect precursors of the various games of the Schafkopf family (which includes Doppelkopf and Skat), were the Spanish national game of L'Hombre (which had reached the Holy Roman Empire through the courtly circles of France in the late 17th century), its four-hand variant, Quadrille, and its simplified German derivative, German Solo. The distinction between variable and permanent trump cards as well as the selection of a contract by announcing and bidding, probably originate from these games. However, it is likely that the distinctive Bavarian game was derived from German Schafkopf, itself a game that originated in Leipzig, Saxony and spread to Franconia in northern Bavaria through what is now Thuringia. (Note: Thuringia as such did not exist at the time but much of the area was ruled by Saxony.)

The special feature of Bavarian Schafkopf, the selection of a playing partner by 'calling' a Sow (= Deuce, but often called an Ace), was also usual in German Solo; the determination of the winning team by counting card points (Augen), instead of tricks, however, has another origin, perhaps in Bavarian Tarock or related games.

A possible ancestor of Schafkopf is the game of Scharwenzel, first recorded in Leipzig in 1715, but this is known in two forms. In northern Germany, Scharwenzel is a plain-trick game resembling German Solo but with the 4 Unters as permanent trumps below the Q♣, trump 7 and Q♠. In Bavaria there was a different game that was related to Färbeln and Grobhäusern in which the 4 Unters and possibly 4 Nines were wild.

=== Emergence and development ===
The origin and development of the game of Schafkopf - in comparison with Skat - are rather poorly documented. This may be due, on the one hand, to its relatively low social reputation - in the first half of the 19th century Schafkopf was regarded as a comparatively unfashionable and simple "farmer's game" when seen against the backdrop of ever more popular card games (such as German Solo or Skat), especially at the universities - and, on the other hand, to changes in concept: originally the name referred to its forerunner, located more or less in the Saxon-Thuringian area and now called German Schafkopf to distinguish it. In this older game, which had several variants, the declarer's team was generally determined by a combination of the two highest trump cards, in a not dissimilar manner to the way the Queens of Clubs are used in Doppelkopf today, for example. The variants played in the Palatinate and in the USA (especially in Wisconsin and Minnesota, cf. Sheepshead) should be understood as further developments of this German Schafkopf. The assumption often heard in Bavaria that Skat and Doppelkopf developed from the Bavarian Schafkopf is unlikely; a development of all three games from German Schafkopf is more likely.

The game of Schafkopf is first recorded in the 1780s in the literature. In Hartmann's comedy, The Thankful Daughter (Die Dankbare Tochter) published in 1780, Platz tells his brother that "I thought we'd play a Schaafkopf" and they go to look for a pack of cards. It also appears in a 1782 Saxon schedule of penalties, Drinking and Gaming on Workdays and Sundays (Zechen und Spielen an Werktagen und Sonntagen), typically with the remark that, unlike Hazard for example, it was not to be considered a game of chance in the legal sense and was thus permitted.

The specifically Bavarian variant of the game originated with the introduction of the Rufer or 'Call Ace' contract in the first half of the 19th century - apparently in Franconia. The first clear mention of a game of Schafkopf played according to Bavarian rules (in Gräfenberg) dates to the year 1849; and while Schafkopf playing in Franconia was already widespread in the 1840s, in the Bavarian Forest, Tarock (the Bavarian game, not the true Tarock game played in Austria) was more popular. The question about the origin of the Bavarian Schafkopf cannot be answered conclusively, but available sources suggest a migration from north to south.

Das Schafkopf-Büchlein, 1895

The earliest clear description of the game appears in a poem, Das edle Schafkopf-Spiel (Note: "The Noble Game of Schafkopf.") in the Regensburger Conversations-Blatt in 1876 which not only lists all 14 trumps, but also the contracts of Rufer and Solo as well as features such as the called Ace and losing Schneider. However, the oldest actual rule set for Bavarian Schafkopf is found in Der gewandte Kartenspieler: 2. Der Schaffkopf: ein geistreiches Kartenspiel (Note: "The Skilful Card Player: 2. Schafkopf: an Ingenious Card Game.") printed in Würzburg in 1884. This was followed a decade later by the Schafkopf-Büchlein - Detailliche Anleitung zum Lernen und Verbessern des Schafkopfspiel mit deutschen Karten, (Note: "Schafkopf Booklet - Detailed Instructions for Learning and Improving at the Game of Schafkopf Using German-Suited Cards.") published in Amberg in 1895, in which the author explicitly explains the differences from Schafkopf variants played in northern Germany, i.e. Skat and Doppelkopf. The 1876 poem is reprinted although the author clearly did not know its origin.

Schafkopf was a penny ante game, typically played for low stakes. An 1876 table of "card game tariffs" gives 3 levels of payment. In the cheapest, a single game was 3 pfennigs, winning Schneider was worth 5 pfennigs and a march (Durchmarsch) earned 7 pfennigs. These rates were paid by each loser to a different winner. The tariff for matadors was 3 pfennigs for 3 matadors, 5 pfennigs for 4, 7 pfennigs for 5 and so on. At the second level the rates were 5/8/10 and at the third level 10/15/20. The tariff for a Solo is not mentioned but was usually double and paid by each loser to the winner or vice versa.

Schafkopf competitions were frequently reported in the newspapers along with unusual feats. In 1880, the Lichtenfelser Tagblatt reported that a Schafkopf player in Staffelstein had played and won a Heart Solo with no trumps. He had 2 Aces twice guarded and an Ace guarded singly, but no Tens; he led to the first trick and made 65 points to the astonishment of the other players with 14 trumps between them. In Ebermannstadt in 1881 at a private shooting club party, a gentlemen, Johann Weigel, played and won a Schafkopf without any of the 8 "matadors", which the defenders had to pay on scoring only 59, resulting in long faces and complaining. In Pasing in 1888, a similar feat was reported: in a game of "the noble Schaffkopf" a player had won a Solo without possessing a single matador. A few days later in Freyung, a player was dealt all eight matadors, a feat now known as a Sie. In 1929, it was reported that, in Türkenfeld a player won a Bell Solo by 4 points with the Ace and Nine of Leaves, but not a single Unter. And in 1931, master signwriter M. Schleicher "had the good fortune to be able to play a Solo-Tout with the 8 highest cards [8 Buben]"; clearly it was not called a "Sie" at that time, nor was it won without play.

In the early rule sets, there were only two contracts: a Frage (now Rufer) in which the declarer called for a non-trump Ace and its holder became the declarer's partner and Hearts were always trumps; and a Solo in which the declarer entrumped any suit and played alone against three defenders. During the 20th century, however, other contracts began to emerge. Ramsch, in which the player with the most points loses, appears in 1933 and is joined by Bettel and Schieber-Solo in 1956. In 1974, Wenz, now standard, was still being described as a variation.

The rules of the game were officially established by the Bavarian Schafkopf Club (Bayerischer Schafkopf-Verein e. V.) at the 1st Bavarian Schafkopf Congress on 17 December 1989 in Munich's Hofbräuhaus These were updated by the School of Schafkopf (Schafkopfschule e. V.) in 2007 which has published a revised version on its website. The School of Schafkopf has established itself as an authority on questions of rule interpretation.

== Overview and aim ==
Schafkopf is a four-player game in which players bid either to play with the aid of a partner or, if their hand is strong enough, to play alone against the other three players. Players receive eight cards from a 32-card, German-suited deck in which the suit ranking is A (high) 10 K O U 9 8 7. However, the game is dominated by trumps because the trump suit is usually augmented by Obers and Unters. There is a simple auction in which players get one chance to pass or play a contract. If two offer to play, there is a priority based on the rank of the contract and the order of bidding. The winning bidder becomes the declarer and clarifies the contract.

The lowest contract and by far the most commonly played is a Rufer ("Caller") in which the declarer names a side suit Ace (not held) and the player with the called Ace becomes the silent partner, whose identity is only revealed by the play of the cards. There is a long trump suit comprising all four Obers, four Unters and all the Hearts: 14 trumps in all. The aim is not primarily to win tricks but to capture cards with a point value – especially Aces and Tens – whereby the values are A = 11, Ten = 10, King = 4, Ober = 3, Unter = 2 and the rest are 'nixers', worth nothing. Thus the overall aim is to score as many points as possible by skilful and tactical play both in partnership and or individual games.

A player with high trumps and a long suit may risk a soloist game of which there are two in standard Schafkopf: the Wenz, in which only Unters are trumps, and the Solo in which any suit may be named as trumps alongside the usual Obers and Unters. The declarer, this time as a soloist, plays alones against the three defenders who band together to try to prevent the declarer from winning. In most games, the target is for the declaring team or soloist to score at least 61 of the 120 card points available. There are bonuses for scoring over 3/4 of the points or taking all eight tricks. An exception are the slam (Tout) contracts, in which the soloist must take all eight tricks to win.

Schafkopf is not classed by the German authorities as a gambling game in the legal sense by the relevant section of the act, § 284 StGB, and may therefore be played in Germany for money. The tariff must be settled before the game starts. Especially in Bavaria it is normally played for small stakes to make it more interesting and the players more focused.

== Cards ==
Schafkopf is a four-handed game played with a 32-card, German-suited, Bavarian or Franconian pattern pack. This is for the standard Schafkopf with 'long cards' or with a 'long pack' in which eight cards are dealt to each player. There is also a variant played with 'short cards' called Short Schafkopf.

Suits of the Bavarian pattern
Acorns (Eichel)	Leaves (Grün/Gras)	Hearts (Herz)	Bells (Schellen)
Acorn symbol of Bavarian playing cards	Leaves symbol of Bavarian playing cards	Hearts symbol of Bavarian playing cards	Bells symbol of Bavarian playing cards

=== Suits ===
German packs have four suits: Acorns (Eichel), Leaves (Gras), Hearts (Herz) and Bells (Schellen).

=== Card values ===
There are eight cards in each suit: Ace, King, Ober, Unter, 10, 9, 8 and 7. The cards in any one suit have a collective value of 30 points; thus there are 120 points to be played for in the pack. The values in card points are: Ace 11, Ten 10, King 4, Ober 3, Unter 2, remainder 0.

The Obers and Unters were collectively known historically as matadors, but nowadays as lords (Herren) or bowers (Bauern).

=== Card names ===
For historical reasons the Ace is known in Bavaria as a Sau ("Sow") and, despite having "A" as a corner index, displays two suit symbols at each end. This is because the Ace was dropped from German packs very early on and later replaced by the Deuce. The Deuces used to bear illustrations of a wild boar, hence the nickname "sow". Today, only the Ace of Bells retains a wild boar image. The King, normally König in German, is often nicknamed the Kini and many of the cards, individually or collectively have nicknames. Among the more important are the Unters which are called Wenzels, hence the name of the Wenz contract. The Nines, Eights and Sevens, which have no point value and are only of use as guard cards, are variously known as "sparrows" (Spatzen), "nothings" or "nixers" (Nichtser(le)) or "blanks" (Leere or Luschen).

== Standard Schafkopf ==
Standard or pure (reiner) Schafkopf comprises three basic contracts – Rufer, Wenz and Solo – which are universally known and the only ones permitted at most tournaments. The following description takes account of the official rules published by the Schafkopf School in Munich.

=== Deal ===
Four players sit crosswise at the table. The first dealer is usually decided by drawing from the pack; the player with the highest card wins. The dealer shuffles and then has the pack cut by the player to the right. When cutting, at least three cards must be lifted or left. The pack may be cut up to 3 times.

The dealer deals clockwise beginning with forehand, to the left. Each player receives 8 cards in two rounds: being given 4 cards in the first round and 4 in the second.

The role of dealer rotates clockwise; four deals or hands make a round.

=== Auction ===
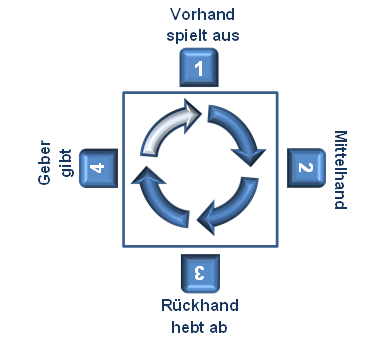
Bidding sequence: 1, 2, 3, 4. 1: Forehand, opens the bidding 2: Middlehand, bids 2nd 3: Rearhand, cuts the pack, bids 3rd 4: Dealer, deals cards, bids last

Before play, there is an auction (Note: Auction: Spielansage.) to determine the declarer and which contract will be played. Players have one opportunity to bid and do so in clockwise order, beginning with forehand. The ranking of the contracts in ascending order is: Rufer, Wenz, Solo, Wenz Tout, Solo Tout, Sie.

Forehand opens by saying "pass" if not wishing to bid, or "I'll play" to bid any contract. (Note: Pass: ich passe, weiter or weg; I'll play: ich spiele.) If forehand passes, the next player in turn has the same options, and so on round the table.

As soon as someone offers to 'play', a subsequent player must either pass, by saying "play on" or "good", or overcall with "I'll play too". (Note: Play on: spiel zu; good: ist Recht; I'll play too: ich spiele auch or ich würde auch spielen.) By overcalling, a player commits to a playing a soloist contract (Wenz or Solo).

When a second bid is made, the first bidder must either pass or say "I'll play myself", (Note: I'll play myself: ich spiele selbst.) to play a Wenz or Solo.

If the first bidder says "I'll play myself", the second must pass unless intending to play a Solo, which is announced by saying "I have a Solo" or "but not a Wenz". (Note: I have a Solo: ich hätte einen Solo; but not a Wenz: aber keinen Wenz.)

The first bidder may hold again by saying "myself". The second bidder would now have to announce an intention to take all eight tricks (Tout) by saying "Wenz Tout", "Solo Tout" or, in the rare event of being dealt all 8 lords, "Sie".

If two players have equal bids, the earlier bidder has the priority. Once either passes, the next player in turn must overcall or pass.

If all pass, the cards are thrown in and the next dealer deals. (Note: Alternatively, in social settings, either a) the cards are thrown in and a Bock round is played in which the game value is doubled, or b) they play a force (Muss) whereby the player with the O declares a contract and a Rufer is played, each person partnering the one opposite (this is often a tournament rule), or c) they play a Ramsch.)

=== Contracts ===
==== Rufer ====
The normal contract: Rufer
Trumps:	O O O O U U U U A 10 K 9 8 7
Side suits:	A 10 K 9 8 7
Side suits:	A 10 K 9 8 7	A 10 K 9 8 7

A Rufer is the normal contract and the one played about 80% of the time. (Note: Rufer (lit. "Caller") is usually called Rufspiel ("Call game") in German, although Normalspiel ("normal game"), Sauspiel ("Sow game") or Partnerspiel ("partnership game") are also encountered.) It is a partnership game in which the four Obers are the highest trumps – in the order (highest to lowest) Acorns, Leaves, Hearts and Bells – followed by the four Unters in the same order; and then the remaining Hearts cards - in the order Ace, Ten, King, Nine, Eight, Seven, making a total of 14 trumps (see table). All the rest are side suit cards and rank in the same order as the Hearts.

A player who wishes to play with the help of a partner may announce a Rufer and - unless someone bids a Wenz or Solo – will become the declarer. To choose a playing partner, the declarer 'calls' for a non-trump Ace (A, A, A). The declarer must not have the Ace in question and must have at least one card of the same suit as the called Ace. The declarer and the owner of the called Ace then play together as a team and will combine their points won in tricks at the end. The other two become the defenders and will also combine their points.

The player with the called Ace, (Note: Rufsau, lit. "Called Sow".) may not reveal this and is only discovered during play. Strict rules apply to the playing of the called Ace:

- It must be played if its suit is led to a trick, even if the called player has another card of that suit. (Note: It is common for the defenders to lead the called suit in order to 'draw out' the called Ace and establish the partnerships.)
- It may not be smeared if the led card is of a different suit, even though the called player is void in that suit.
- A player may not lead another card of the called suit while holding the called Ace back with the exception below.
- If the called player has at least 3 other cards of the called suit and that suit has not already been played, a lower card may be led, and the called Ace held back. This is 'running away' and the called Ace is referred to as the 'Running Sow' (Laufsau). There are no restrictions on a Running Sow; it is played as any other side suit Ace.
- If the called Ace is not led or demanded earlier, it must be left to the last trick.

==== Wenz ====
Wenz
Trumps:	U U U U
Side suits:	A 10 K O 9 8 7	A 10 K O 9 8 7
Side suits:	A 10 K O 9 8 7	A 10 K O 9 8 7

A Wenz (Note: Wenz: pronounced "Vents". Also Bauernwenz or Hauswenz as opposed to Farb-Wenz in which a trump suit is nominated alongside the Unters.) overcalls a Rufer and is only outbid by a Solo. If two players bid a Wenz, the one who bid first wins. In a Wenz the declarer plays against the other three players. The only trumps are the four Unters, also known as Wenzen, hence the name of the contract. They rank from highest to lowest: U, U, U and U. The Obers rank in their natural suits between the King and Nine. Hearts are no longer trumps and there is no option to name another suit as trumps as in the Suit Wenz.

==== Solo ====
Example: Bell Solo (Schellensolo)
Trumps	O O O O U U U U A 10 K 9 8 7
Side suits:	A 10 K 9 8 7
Side suits:	A 10 K 9 8 7	A 10 K 9 8 7

In a solo – strictly speaking, a suit solo (Farbsolo) – the Obers and Unters remain the highest trumps, but the soloist is free to choose any suit as trumps, its cards then ranking in the usual ace–ten order (see table). (Note: In the past, a heart solo was sometimes ranked higher that the other suit solos, but that is now uncommon.)

==== Tout and Sie ====
A player intending to make a slam, by taking every trick, may announce a Tout as part of the contract e.g. Wenz Tout or Acorn Solo Tout. A Tout (Note: Tout is French for "all"; pronounced Du in Bavarian and "too" in English.) outranks all other contracts and a Solo Tout overcalls a Wenz Tout. In a Tout, card points are irrelevant; the soloist must take every trick to win. If the defenders take a single trick – even one with no card points – the soloist loses. A Tout usually doubles the normal game value.

The highest possible contract in Schafkopf is a Sie, when a player is dealt all 4 Obers and all 4 Unters (Note: In the short game, the 4 Obers and 2 top Unters are a Tout; there is no Sie.) The probability of this is 1 in 10,518,300 (in short cards 1 in 134,596). (Note: The origin of the name is uncertain, but may a folk etymological analogy with Tout/Du, since Sie is the formal form of the German word du which mean "you" (informal, singular).) It is the only game that does not have to be played out; the hand is simply placed on the table. It normally scores four times the basic game value. In many Bavarian pubs, a Sie is honoured by the custom of no longer using the cards, but framing the Sie hand on the wall together with the date and name of the player.

=== Doubling ===
A defender who might have a stronger hand than the declarer may double the game value by announcing "Stoss!" or "Spritzn!" This must be done before the second card is played to the first trick. The declarer may redouble with "Retour!" before the second card is played. The role of declarer does not switch.

=== Play ===
Once the contract has been announced, forehand leads to the first trick and then the other players play a card in clockwise order. Players must follow suit. If they are unable to do so, they may either play a trump or any card from a side suit. The trick is won by the highest trump or, if no trumps are played, by the highest card of the led suit. Once there are four cards on the table, the player who has won the trick picks it up and places it face down in a pile on the table. The winner of the trick leads to the next trick and so on, until all 32 cards - 8 tricks - have been played.

Failure to follow suit, criticising or verbally trying to influence the game generally results in the loss of the game.

If a trick is not yet completed (i.e. the cards are still face up on the table), each player has the right to ask to see the previous trick.

=== Scoring ===
After play is over, the card points are counted for each side and the game is scored. The declarer's team (declarer plus partner) or soloist must score at least 61 points, which means that the defenders only need 60 to win.

There is a bonus for Schneider: scoring 91 points or more and for Schwarz: taking all tricks. At 31 card points the declarer's team or soloist are out of Schneider (Schneider frei). For the defending team, the game is won with only 60 points, a Schneider is achieved with just 90 points and they are out of Schneider with 30 points (see table).

An exception are Tout (i.e. slam) contracts, in which the soloist must take all eight tricks to win. If the defenders take one trick, the soloist has lost.

Declaring team	Declaring team's result	Defending team's result	Defending team
won with Schwarz	all tricks taken	no tricks taken	lost with Schwarz
won with Schneider	91–120 points	0–29 points	lost with Schneider
simple win	61–90 points	30–59 points	simple loss
simple loss	31–60 points	60–89 points	simple win
lost with Schneider	0–30 points	90–120 points	won with Schneider
lost with Schwarz	no tricks taken	all tricks taken	won with Schwarz

The scale of win and type of contract determine the game points awarded using a zero-sum system. For example, in a Rufer, a simple win earns 1 game point for each partner on the winning team and costs -1 for each loser. A soloist who wins with 61-90 card points earns 5 game points from each defender for a total of 15, costing each defender -5 game points. Points may be converted to money at an agreed tariff – see below.

=== Settlement ===
If Schafkopf is played for money, the winnings are paid out after the end of each hand. The unit of payment (e.g. 5 cents) and the tariff (the rate for the different games) must be agreed beforehand. In the official rules the game value for the different contracts is:

- Rufer: 1 unit
- Wenz: 5 units
- Solo: 5 units

==== Schneider and Schwarz ====
If a team is Schneider at the end of the game, the value of the game is increased by 1 unit. If they are Schwarz it is increased by 2 units (whether the game has been won by the declarer's team or the defenders has no effect on the tariff). The payment of Schneider is a matter of honour and paid voluntarily, whereas Schwarz must be claimed by the winner.

==== Runners ====
Runners (Note: Laufende or Läufer.) are trumps held by one side or the other in unbroken sequence from the highest downwards. They earn an additional 1 unit per runner provided that there are at least 3 runners in a Rufer or Solo, or at least 2 in a Wenz.

Example: Annika wins a Solo with 91 card points having had the 3 highest Obers. From each opponent she earns 20 cents for the win, 10 cents for Schneider (over 90) and 30 cents for 3 runners making a total game value of 60 cents. Thus she earns 180 cents in total; each opponent paying her 60 cents.

=== Tournament rules ===
Seating is pre-determined and player 1 at each table is the first dealer. To shuffle a new pack, the Sixes are removed, the cards spread over the table, face down, and shuffled by all four players. Cards are shuffled a second time by another player before cutting.

In some Schafkopf tournaments there is a special variant of the Stock called the Reuegeld.

=== Social games ===
==== Deal ====
In social games, the cutter may instruct the dealer to deal the cards differently e.g. "all eight" instead of 2 packets of 4, or "anti-clockwise".

==== Payments ====
Social games are often played for small stakes where e.g. 1 unit = 5 cents. The tariff is usually made up of a lower rate for Rufer games (the 'unit') and a higher rate for Wenz and Solo games, usually 2 or 5 units, chosen for ease of calculation and coin size. For example, if 5 cents is the rate for a Rufer and the Wenz/Solo rate is 20 cents, the basic tariff is referred to as 5/20. In social games, the most common rates are 5/20, 10/20 and 10/50 (equivalent to the Schafkopf School tariff).

Sometimes the tariff includes a third sum to counteract the sometimes disproportionate effect of bonuses. For example, if the rate is 10/20/50, then 10 cents is the basic tariff for Schneider and runners (see below); 20 cents is paid for a Rufer and for Schwarz and 50 cents for a Wenz or Solo.

In private rounds the minimum number of runners in all contracts may be set at 3. A maximum may also be set at anything between 4 and 14.

==== Scoring table ====
The following example is a typical point scoring scheme for social Schafkopf. It may be converted to a payment scheme by setting e.g. 1 point = 10 cents which corresponds to a 10/20 payment system.

Partnership contract
Contract	Result	Winners	Losers
Rufer	straight win	+ 1 each	1 each
Rufer	won with Schneider	+ 2 each	2 each
Rufer	won with Schwarz	+ 3 each	3 each
Soloist contracts
Contract	Result	Soloist	Defenders
Wenz, Solo	won by soloist	+ 6	2 each
Wenz, Solo	lost by soloist	6	+ 2 each
Wenz, Solo	won by soloist Schneider	+ 9	3 each
Wenz, Solo	lost by soloist Schneider	9	+ 3 each
Wenz, Solo	won by soloist Schwarz	+ 12	4 each
Wenz, Solo	lost by soloist Schwarz	12	+ 4 each
Wenz, Solo	won by soloist with Tout	+ 18	6 each
Wenz, Solo	lost by soloist with Tout	18	+ 6 each
Sie	immediate win	+24	-8 each

==== Pot ====
If playing for money, players may pre-agree that each player puts a sweetener (e.g. 10 cents) into the pot (Stock, Henn, Pott or Topf) following deals where the cards are thrown in. The declarer in the next hand now has the chance to win the pot. If successful, the declarer alone sweeps the pot in addition to the normal winnings shared with a partner. If unsuccessful, the declarer alone doubles the contents of the pot and play continues with the next declarer a game having an opportunity chance to win the pot. In some circles, the sweetener can only be won by the successful declaring pair in a Rufer; both doubling the pot if they lose.

== Optional contracts ==
Contract type	Game
Tout games (those in which all tricks are taken)	Sie
Tout games (those in which all tricks are taken)	Solo Tout
Tout games (those in which all tricks are taken)	Wenz Tout
Tout games (those in which all tricks are taken)	Geier Tout
Tout games (those in which all tricks are taken)	Suit Wenz Tout
Tout games (those in which all tricks are taken)	Suit Geier Tout
Tout games (those in which all tricks are taken)	Bettel Brett, Ramsch Tout
Solo games	Solo
Solo games	Wenz
Solo games	Geier
Solo games	Suit Wenz
Solo games	Suit Geier
Solo games	Negative games (Bettel etc.)*
Partnership games	Hochzeit (Wedding)*
Partnership games	Rufer
Partnership games	Force (Muss)
Ramsch

Part of the rich culture of Schafkopf is the diverse range of optional contracts that may be added to classic or 'pure' Schafkopf. These contracts are rarely allowed in tournaments, but have a permanent place in many places where Schafkopf is played for leisure. The ranking of the most common add-on contracts is shown in the table alongside the standard Schafkopf contracts (* = classification regionally very different).

=== Special partnership contracts ===
==== Hochzeit ====
A player with only one trump, may place it face down on the table and offer a Hochzeit ("Wedding" or "Marriage"). The player who picks up the card first (the dealer invites them to do so in clockwise order) passes a non-trump card face down in exchange to the "suitor" (Hochzeiter) and becomes the partner. In the variant Bauernhochzeit ("Farmers' Wedding"), also called Doppelhochzeit ("Double Wedding"), two cards are exchanged.

The rules vary slightly from region to region. For example, they may stipulate that the wedding card must be placed face up on the table or may only be allowed if all players have passed. In the (rare) case that two players hold only one trump each, a Double Wedding is also possible. The declaring team is the pair that announced the first Wedding.

==== Kreuzbock ====
The Kreuzbock, also callea a Kreuzrunde, Kreuz, Rock or Goaß is a partnership variant played, for example, if all players have passed, after a Heart Solo or after a lost Solo. Usually a full round (four hands) is played. The players facing one another across the table automatically form teams. Although rules vary from region to region, it is usually agreed that the declarer's team is:

- the team that said the last Stoss or Contra etc.
- if no Stoss or Contra has been said, the first team to lay
- if there has been no Contra or laying, the team leading to the first trick

==== Muss ====
A Muss is a force contract and the most common outcome in tournaments in the event that all four players pass. In this event, the owner of a particular card (almost always the O) must play the game as declarer. Muss has some special features: the game is won if the declarer's team score 60 card points and is schneider free with 30 points (correspondingly won as schneider with 90 points). In addition, no Contra may be given. If the Muss player is 'blocked' (gesperrt) by having no suit in which to call an Ace, it is permitted to renege (renonce) by calling an Ace without having a card of that suit. If the Muss player holds all three side suit Aces himself, a Ten may be called or, failing that, even a King.

=== Special soloist contracts ===
These games, too, are generally only of regional significance, as a result only the most common are described here.

==== Geier ====
Geier
Trumps:	O O O O
Side suits:	A 10 K U 9 8 7	A 10 K U 9 8 7
Side suits:	A 10 K U 9 8 7	A 10 K U 9 8 7

Geier is a contract in which only the Obers are trumps. There are thus 11 trumps and the Unters take their place between the King and Nine of their respective suits. It ranks below a Wenz.

There are similar contract variants in which another card denomination is entrumped:

- Kaiser: only the Kings are trumps. Also called König, Keni, Krone, Habicht, Adler, Hühnergeier or Bart. Ranks below Geier.
- Eisenbahner: only the Tens are trumps. Ranks below Adler and Geier
- Spatz: only the Sevens are trumps. Ranks above Wenz.

==== Suit Geier ====
A Suit Geier (Farbgeier) is a Geier in which a suit is also nominated as trumps. Thus in a Leaf Geier, Leaves are trumps as well as the four Obers. The trump ranking in a Leaf Geier is thus: O O O O A 10 K U 9 8 7.

The corresponding contracts for the other variants are:

- Suit Kaiser: Also called a Suit König (Farbkönig) etc.
- Suit Eisenbahner (Farbeisenbahner).

==== Suit Wenz ====
Example: Bell Wenz (Schellenwenz)
Trumps	U U U U A 10 K O 9 8 7
Side suits:	A 10 K O 9 8 7
Side suits:	A 10 K O 9 8 7	A 10 K O 9 8 7

In a Suit Wenz (Farbwenz), the Unters are the highest trumps and, in addition, a trump suit is also chosen. The Obers revert to their normal suits which leaves eleven trumps. Thus there are four distinct contracts: Acorn Wenz (Eichewenz), Leaf Wenz (Graswenz), Heart Wenz (Herzwenz) and Bell Wenz (Schellenwenz). During the bidding process, if two players bid and need to clarify their contracts, a player need only say e.g. "I have a Suit Wenz", thus concealing their strong suit. If that player wins the auction, the suit is clarified by saying e.g. "I'm playing a "Bell Wenz".

==== Bettel ====
Bettel
No trumps
A K O U

10 9 8 7

A K O U

10 9 8 7

A K O U

10 9 8 7

A K O U

10 9 8 7

A Bettel is a classic negative contract where the soloist undertakes not to take a single trick. There are no trumps and, unlike the normal contracts, cards rank in their natural order: A K O U 10 9 8 7. A Bettel ranks above a Rufer and Hochzeit and either just below a Geier/Wenz or between those and a Solo. In settling a Bettel, the rate for a soloist game is often used as the basis for calculation, sometimes a separate rate is determined. Variants include:

- Bettel Brett: a variant found in many regions which is simply a Bettel played ouvert. The declarer's cards are placed face up after the first trick. Double the value of a Bettel.
- Pfd (Mörtel or Ramsch Tout): played as a Bettel but Obers, Unters and hearts are trumps as in a Rufer and ace–ten ranking is used.

Sometimes variants are played where the Obers and Unters are trumps, but there is no trump suit.

=== Special games or rounds ===
Sometimes special games rounds with different rules are played after certain events (for example, Kreuzbock rounds, Doppler or Bock rounds and Ramsch rounds).

==== Bock games or rounds ====
Bock games or rounds are those for which there is double tariff. Players may agree beforehand that they will occur, for example, after the cards are thrown in, after a lost solo or doubled game, after a game ends 60-all and/or after Schwarz or Re games. In the case of a Bock round, the next four deals are played at double the usual tariff.

==== Ramsch ====
Ramsch is a contract often played if no-one has bid (often the 'last man' has the option of announcing Ramsch if the players bidding before him have all passed). There is no declarer and each player plays individually against everyone else. The same trump cards apply as for a Rufer, but this time the aim is to score as few card points as possible. The player with the most points loses and pays the others. If two or more players score the same number of points, the one with the most tricks loses. If the number of tricks is also equal, the player with the most trumps in the tricks loses; if that number is also equal, the player with the higher trump loses. Special rules adapted from Skat are the Durchmarsch or Mord, which correspond to a "sweep" or "slam", i.e. one player takes all the tricks to wins the game, and Jungfrau ("maiden") (i.e. one or two players do not make a trick, the loser pays twice or four times). There are no fixed rules for settling a Ramsch contract: either the loser pays the basic rate or a specially agreed rate to all players or the two players with the most points pay to the other two.

A variation is Schieberamsch, a local variant, where the tricks are passed on clockwise at the end of the game, and where the player who has the fewest points at the end also wins.

==== Schieber ====
A Schieber, Schiebersolo or Schieber Round (Schieber-Runde) is played as a full round of 4 deals. The O and O (the 2 highest lords) are removed from the pack before dealing; the dealer deals as usual, but receives only 6 cards. Forehand picks up the 2 cards and must decide whether to pass them on or play a Solo. Either way, forehand passes (pushes or schiebt) any two cards face down to middlehand. If they are the two lords, middlehand has the same choice. This continues until the third player passes two cards to the dealer, who now has 8 cards. The player who has the two lords announces trumps and must play a Solo against the rest. If none wishes to play a Solo the cards are either thrown in. Schieber is also possible with 3 cards being set aside or with 4 cards, in which case all 4 Obers are removed and the Solo must be determined before the cards are dealt.

Related to four-card Schieber is the Devil's Round (Teufelsrunde) from Munich. Forehand is given the O, O, O and U and must announce the Solo before any cards are dealt.

==== Other special rounds ====
Of the myriad special contracts, often regional or local, a selection is described here:

- Allgäu Round (Allgäuer Runde, Chiprunde, Fisiko, Drei-Kombi-Muss): three rounds are played, during which each player has to play a Rufer, a Wenz and a Solo.
- Hadschader (Hatschate, Hadsch or Hatsch): (Note: Hadschader. High German: Humpelnde, ("the Hobbled One").) After a lost solo, a round played in which forehand must always play and is automatically stossed.
- Minas is when, after a Solo has been won, a round of forced Solos is played. In each case forehand must play a Solo of his or her choice. After the end of the round the player with the poorest Solo result makes a pre-agreed payment to the three winners. (Mönchberg, Unterfranken)

- Strixner (Solo hinterum): there is no auction and players compete individually under normal rules. Whoever wins the third trick, must announce a solo contract. In the version called Solo hinterum, the soloist is the first to three tricks; if all take two, it is scored as in a Ramsch.

- Zupf Solo: the soloist is allowed to 'pluck' (zupfen) any card from another player's hand and give any card in exchange (Bavarian Swabia).

==== Last round ====
A Schafkopf session traditionally ends with the words "the old man deals the last round" (Der Alte gibt die letzte Runde). The player who last had the O in a Rufer, then deals the first hand of the final round. For the last round, special rules sometimes apply (double game values, only Solo games or the like).

=== Other variations ===
==== Doubling ====
Variations of the official procedure for doubling include:

- Alternatives to Stoss: Contra, Kontra or Spritze
- Alternatives to Retour: Re, Gegenstoß.
- Escalation: after Stoss and Retour, further doubling calls – e.g. Sub, Re-Sub, etc. – are allowed, each doubling the game value.
- First (Card): doubling is only allowed as the first card is led to the first trick.
- Eight Cards: players may double as they play their first card and redouble as they play their second.
- Taking over the Game: by calling Contra the defenders take over the game (Kontra übernimmt) and need 61 points to win.
- Knocking: In some circles, doubling is announced by knocking (klopfen) on the table or by saying e.g. "Doppeln!" Normally a token (Note: The token could be e.g. a matchbox, special coin or bottle top.) is placed on the table to confirm this. Depending on the local rules only forehand, only one player or all players may double. If more than one player doubles the game the factors are multiplied, i.e. one player 2x, two players 4x, three players 8x and four players 16x. These factors take effect after all bonuses are added. In the case of Tout the game value doubles but no Schneider or Schwarz bonus is paid. See Doubling variations.
- Laying (Legen): after picking up their first packet of 4 cards (3 in Short Schafkopf), players in turn may 'lay' (legen) a coin or other object, the Leger, on the table. Each Leger doubles the game again. In some circles, forehand may lay, but a subsequent player may only lay if the player beforehand has done so. This is called laying "one after the other" (nacheinander) as opposed to "all over the place" (durcheinander).
- Knocking (Klopfen): after picking up their first packet of 4 cards (3 in Short Schafkopf), players may 'knock (klopfen) in clockwise order; each knock doubles the game.

==== Scoring in 'impure' Schafkopf ====
Taking all the possible contracts, bonuses and doubling mechanisms, results in the following scheme for calculating the game value if G is the basic tariff (Grundtarif) or payment unit for a Rufer:

Game	Tariff	+ Schneider	+ Schwarz	+ Runners	Multiplication	Doubling (Stoss, Legen, Bock)	= Game Value
Rufer	1 × G or 2 × G	+ 1 × G	+ 1 × G	+ each × G or ½ × G	–	each × 2	Sum
Hochzeit	1 × G or 2 × G	+ 1 × G	+ 1 × G	+ each × G or ½ × G	× 2	each × 2	Sum
Wenz, Solo, Geier, other solo contracts	4 × G or 5 × G	+ 1 × G	+ 1 × G	+ each × G or ½ × G	–	each × 2	Sum
Tout	4 × G or 5 × G	–	–	+ each × G or ½ × G	× 2	each × 2	Sum
Sie	4 × G or 5 × G	–	–	+ each × G or ½ × G	× 4	each × 2	Sum

== Variants ==
=== Short Schafkopf ===
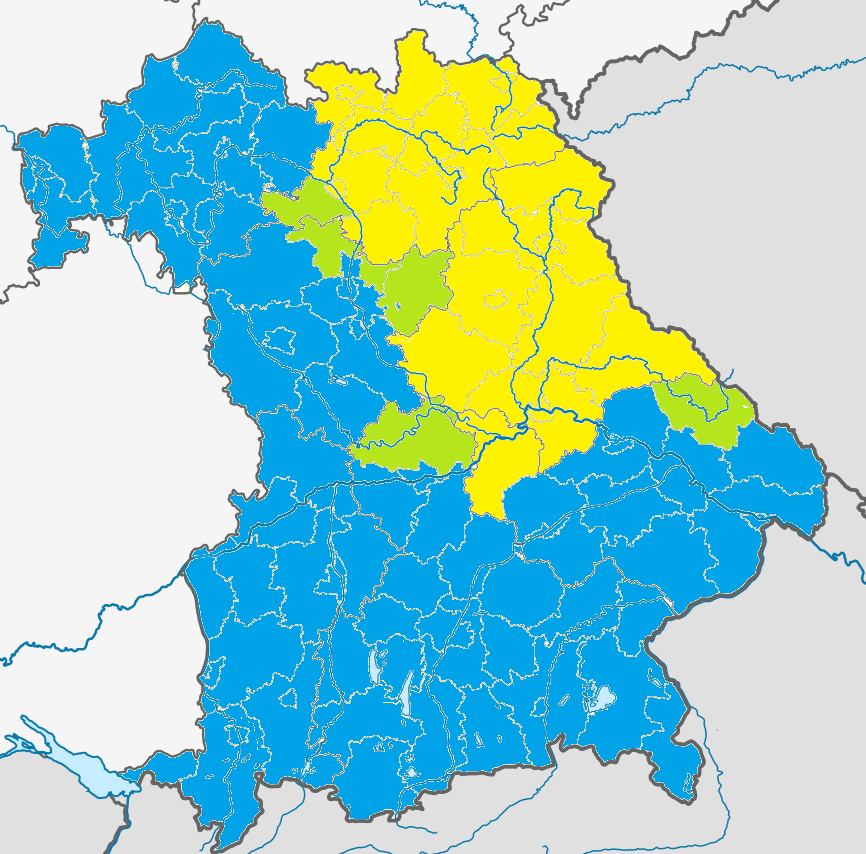
Where Schafkopf is played with long cards with short cards transition regions

A popular variant in parts of eastern Bavarian (Upper Palatinate and Upper Franconia) is "short Schafkopf", also called "sharp Schafkopf", which is played with just 24 cards, the 7s and 8s being removed. This is called playing with a "short pack" (Kurze Karte) and each player only receives 6 instead of the usual 8 cards as in the "long pack". Playing short Schafkopf makes the game faster and alters playing tactics because of the changed probabilities. The cards are more frequently thrown in and partnership games are less common. Sometimes the 9s are removed to leave just 20 cards in the game and players are then dealt 5 cards each. Packs are sold by ASS Altenburger and F.X. Schmid specifically for the short game and labelled Kurze Scharfe ("Short Sharp Ones"), a pun on scharf ("sharp") and Schaf ("sheep"). (Note: In German, short Schafkopf is Kurzer Schafkopf and long Schafkopf is Langer Schafkopf; the short pack is Kurze Karte or Kurzes Blatt and the long pack is Lange Karte or Langes Blatt. Sharp Schafkopf is Scharfer Schafkopf.)

Short Schafkopf is played in Upper Franconia, Upper Palatinate, as well as parts of Middle Franconia and Lower Bavaria. It is also played in the county of Main Tauber Kreis.

A shortened pack is also used for three-hand Schafkopf, players still receiving eight cards as in standard Schafkopf. However, only soloist games (e.g. Wenz, Geier and Solo, but not Rufer) are possible.

=== Palatinate Schafkopf ===
Another popular variant in the Palatinate is Palatinate Schafkopf or Asserufen, which is played with a French-suited card deck, where acorns are replaced by clubs, leaves are replaced by spades, bells are replaces by diamonds, and hearts are replaced by hearts.

=== Two-, Three- and Five-Hand Schafkopf ===
The following variants exist for two, three or five players:

- Two-hand Schafkopf (Schafkopf zu zweit): also called Open Schafkopf (Aufgelegter Schafkopf), Farmer's Schafkopf (Bauernschafkopf) or Officers' Schafkopf (Offiziersschafkopf), a Schafkopf-like game with diverse rules. See also Officers' Skat and Two-Player Wendish Schafkopf.
- Three-hand Schafkopf (Schafkopf zu dritt): the game is played with 'short cards'. Each player is dealt 8 cards and only Solo or Wenz are played. It is not permitted in tournaments.
- Five-hand Schafkopf (Schafkopf zu fünft): as per normal Schafkopf, but the dealer sits out.

=== Bierkopf ===
Bierkopf ("beer head") is a very simplified form of Schafkopf that is a useful entry-level game. Players play in fixed partnerships, there is no auction and trumps are fixed as Obers, Unters and Hearts, as in a Rufer. The game is highly popular in Franconia where it is often played for Masses (litres) of beer. It has been reproduced as an app by Rackoon.

=== Mucken ===
Mucken is a form intermediate between Bierkopf and Schafkopf. Again, there are fixed partnerships and no soloist games, but there is an auction and range of contracts with different trump mixes. Like Bierkopf, it is popular in Franconia and has also been produced as an app by Rackoon.

== Tournament Schafkopf ==
Schafkopf, as a genuine leisure pursuit, is, by definition, not organized; nevertheless, many clubs in public life, such as sports or shooting clubs, but also breweries and restaurants, regularly organize Schafkopf tournaments in Bavaria, where they are also called Schafkopfrennen ("Schafkopf races"). Despite the comparatively uniform rules of these tournaments, there are still considerable regional differences.

== Schafkopf in culture ==
Recently, the declining importance of the Schafkopf game as a leisure activity, especially among young people, has been discussed in Bavarian media. This has also been viewed at the municipal level as an imminent loss of part of Bavarian identity; countermeasures are therefore receiving increasingly wide support. More and more adult education centres in Bavaria offer Schafkopf courses.

Schafkopf has its own language, known as Schafkopf-Sprache which is not always intelligible to outsiders. The game has also entered Bavarian culture in other ways:

=== Literature and media ===
- In a Bavarian version of the song Herz ist Trumpf (Dann rufst du an ...) ("Hearts are Trumps (then call [me]...)") by Trio, Max Griesser describes the course of a Hearts Solo during a game of Schafkopf.
- The crime thriller Schafkopf by Andreas Föhr also deals with the game.
- Schafkopf – a bissel was geht immer is the title of an early evening programme which was aired by German broadcaster, ZDF in 2012. It stars a female detective, Sandra (played by Marlene Morreis), who plays Schafkopf regularly with 3 companions - a police officer, lawyer and priest – who routinely help her solve crime in her local Bavarian town.

=== Ceremonies ===
In some localities, the local Schafkopf club holds an 'Eichelober Ball', electing one of their number as the 'Eichelober' (Ober of Acorns), who wears a fancy hat and presides over ceremonial activities. He may be accompanied by Queen of the Ball. The ball may be funded by the penalty money amassed during the year by playing the game.

=== Records ===
Until 2006, the Guinness Book of Records recognized card game records only if they were based on a French deck of 52 cards. Only after the intervention of Bavarian broadcasters, Bayerischer Rundfunk, was this rule relaxed and Schafkopf was recognized in this category; since then the record for continuous playing has been held exclusively by Schafkopf groups (for medical reasons the Guinness rules allow two substitutes). The officially recognized record playing time is currently 260 hours, placed in November 2013 by one Munich group.

== See also ==
General

- Schafkopf language
- German Schafkopf (ancestor)
- Tournament Schafkopf

Schafkopf family members

- Baśka
- Bauerchen
- Bierkopf
- Doppelkopf
- Kop
- Mariáš
- Mucken
- Officers' Schafkopf
- Scharwenzel
- Schieberamsch
- Sheepshead
- Skærvindsel
- Skat
- Wendish Schafkopf
- Zole

== Bibliography ==
- _ (1872). Karten-Spiel-Tarif. Würzburg: Stahel.
- Altenburger Spielfabrik, Erweitetes Spielregelbüchlein aus Altenburg, 8th edition, Dresden (1988), pp. 177–180.
- Danyliuk, Rita. 1x1 der Kartenspiele. 19th edition. Hanover: Humboldt (2017), pp. 32–38. ISBN 978-3-86910-367-9
- Danyliuk, Rita (2013). Schafkopf und Doppelkopf - Für Anfänger und Fortgeschrittene. Regeln und Taktik. Praktische Tipps Hanover: Humboldt. ISBN 3-89-994194-2.
- Dillig, Stefan (2020). Schafkopf: Mit Taktik zum Erfolg Band 1. Dillig. ISBN 978-3000556647.
- Gregor, Otto (1933). Der "Bayerische" Schafkopf: Strategie u. Taktik. Münchener Kommissionsbuchh. 64 pp.
- Grupp, Claus D. Doppelkopf Schafkopf. Niedernhausen: Falken (1994). ISBN 3 8068 2015 5.
- Grupp, Claus D. Karten-spiele, Niederhausen: Falken (1975/1979), pp. 111–114. ISBN 3-8068-2001-5.
- Hammer, Paul (1811). Die deutschen Kartenspiele oder Anleitung die üblichen gesellschaftlichen Spiele mit der deutschen Karte als Solo, Kontra, Schafkopf....zu lernen. Leipzig.
- Hartmann, Andreas Gottlieb (1780). Die Dankbare Tochter. Leipzig and Budissin: Deinzer.
- Jedelhauser, Philipp (2018). „Das Schafkopfspiel, Vergnügen und Tradition“, in Burgau aktuell, No. 97, November 2018, pp. 25/26, Accessible in the Internet at Stadtzeitung Burgau aktuell.
- Junker-Latocha, Brian (2023). Schafkopf for Expats and English Speakers. Ahrensburg: Tredition Verlag. ISBN 978-3-384-02767-2.
- Jups. Mangold (1884). Der gewandte Kartenspieler: 2. Der Schaffkopf: ein geistreiches Kartenspiel. Würzburg: Stahel.
- Lembke, Robert (1974). Das Große Haus- und Familienbuch der Spiele. Cologne: Lingen.
- Mensing, Otto, ed. (1933). Schleswig-Holsteinisches Wörterbuch: Q bis S (in German). Vol. 4. Neumünster: Wachholtz Verlag. OCLC 163382535. Wikidata Q131604051.
- Merschbacher, Adam (2009). Schafkopf: Das anspruchsvolle Kartenspiel. Munich: Pliz.
- "Obsis" (1895). Schafkopf-Büchlein - Detailliche Anleitung zum Lernen und Verbessern des Schafkopfspiel mit deutschen Karten, Amberg (Oberpfalz).
- Parlett, David. The Penguin Book of Card Games. London: Penguin (2008), pp. 225–229. ISBN 978-0-141-03787-5.
- Peschel, Wolfgang (1990). Bayerisch Schaffkopfen: Wissenswertes - Humoriges - Offizielle Spielreglen, 2nd edn. Weilheim: Stöppel.
- Rodenburg, Julius (1862). Deutsches Magazin: ein illustrirtes Familienbuch, Vol. 1. Berlin: Oswald Seehagen.
- Schaffer, Georg (1956). Schafkopf und Tarock. Minden (Westphalia): Albrecht Philler.
- Schmeller, Johann Andreas (1837). Bayerisches Wörterbuch Vols. III. and IV., Munich 1837, 2nd edn. 1877 (combined into Vol. 2) by Georg Karl Frommann, p. 378.
- Schwarzmann, L. [J.B.C–.] (1876). "Das edle Schafkopf-Spiel" in Regensburger Conversations-Blatt (Beiblatt zum Regensburger Tagblatt), Nro. 4. Sunday 9 January 1876. Regensburg: J. Reitmayr.
- _ (1843) Bayer. Staatsbibliothek: Oberpfälzisches Zeitblatt, 3rd annual edn., Amberg, Saturday 10 June, p. 375 (in Internet).
- Wiesegger, Johann (2021). Schafkopf: Ein Versuch, Wisssen zu sammeln. Nuremberg.
