= Polish playing cards =

	Leaves (Wino)	Hearts (Czerwień)	Acorns (Żołądź)	Bells (Dzwonek)
D				
K				
O				
U				
X				
9				
8				
7				
6				

Polish playing cards (Polish: Karty polskie) have been manufactured since the 15th century and include both French- and German-suited cards. Polish playing cards may also refer more narrowly to the Polish pattern: traditional packs of 36 German-suited playing cards produced in Poland to local designs.

== Description ==
Polish pattern cards comprise the four suits of Leaves (Wino), Hearts (Czerwień), Acorns (Żołądź) and Bells (Dzwonek) and five picture cards: the Ace or Deuce (Tuz), Ten (Kralka) or Banner, King (Król), Ober (Wyżnik) and Unter (Niżnik) and four pip cards: the Nine (Dziewiątka), Eight (Ósemka), Seven (Siódemka) and Six (Szóstka). Sometimes there are additional cards such as the: Five (Piątka), Four (Czwórka) and Three (Trójka).

== History ==
The first cards of this type were imported from Germany and appeared in Polish towns and cities as early as the 15th century. Soon thereafter, domestic production began. In the 16th century, playing card manufacture had begun at Lwów, Wrocław, Poznań, Olkusz and Kraków.

According to Łukasz Gołębiowski, German-suited Polish cards were used to played, among others, the games of Kupiec, (Note: A banking game in which players win for 'point', 'sequence' and 'tierce'.) Kasztelan, Wózek, (Note: Very similar to Czech Dudak. Two to four players use 24 cards. Players must beat the previous card played to a pile and then lay a second card, or pick up the pile. The last player holding cards loses.) Skrzetułka, Drużbart, Pamfil, Chapanka, Tryszak, Mariasz, Piquet (Pikieta) and Cwik.

From the 18th century, French-suited cards and French terminology began to gradually dominate, while traditional Polish cards gradually lost popularity throughout the 19th century. Currently, cards of this pattern (32-piece pack) are still used in Silesia for the game of Skat. Tarot playing cards are also produced for Polish Taroki.

Notable Polish cardmakers in the late 19th and 20th centuries include Willink of Warsaw, Pierswsza and Karpalit of Lvov, the Kraków Playing Card Factory and state-owned KZWP. The latter dominates the market and has recently been renamed Trefl.

== Bibliography ==
- Łukasz Gołębiowski, Gry i zabawy różnych stanów w kraju całym lub niektórych tylko prowincyach, Warsaw 1831.
- Zygmunt Gloger, Old Polish Illustrated Encyclopedia.
