= Chapanka =

Card game

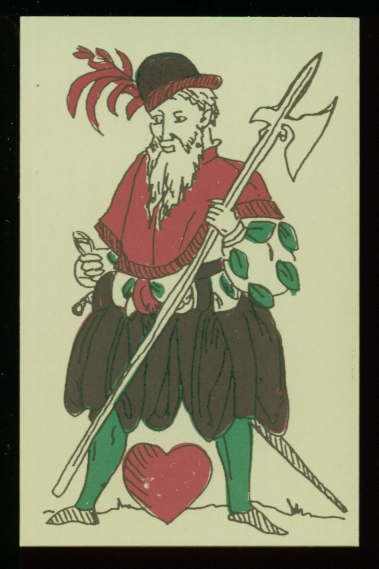
- The Kinal
- Origin: Poland
- Family: Trick avoidance
- Players: 4
- Skills: Strategy
- Cards: 48
- Deck: French or German
- Play: Anticlockwise
- Playing time: 30 min.
- Chance: Difficult

Related games
- Reversis

Chapanka is an historical Polish card game for four players that is an adaptation of the French game of Reversis in which the aim was the lose points.

== History ==
Chapanka is recorded as early as 1752 in a collection of poetry, but the earliest description, which is incomplete, dates to 1831. It appears to have died out towards the end of the 19th century.

== 1831 rules ==
In 1831, Łukasz Gołębiowski recounts the traditional card names and rules. It was a plain-trick game played by 4 people with a German-suited, Old Polish pack of 36 cards (9 cards in each suit). A player who took three tricks, did not lose anything, a player who took more, won more. The highest cards in Chapanka were appropriately named:

- 8 - Dola ("Mad One")
- 6 or 8 - Gółka ("Bare Bum", "Semibreve", "Whole Note")
- 6 - Pancerola ("Armour", "Knight")
- O - Panfil ("Pamphilus", "Ober")
- U - Kinal ("Unter")
- 9 - Mogaczka ("Bulb")
- 9 - Ryndzia ("Yard")

Gołębiowski supposed that the ranking among the rest of the cards was as in Druzbart, however this appears unlikely in view of its origin in Reversis.

== 1930 rules ==
The following is a summary of the 1930 rules by Wytrawny Gracz, (Note: A pseudonym that means "consummate player".) which are almost identical to the 1881 rules by Stary Gracz, who says that Chapanka was adapted from the old French game of Reversis "by our grandfathers" but is "rarely played today". This version is a point-trick game.

Four players play with a French-suited pack of 52 cards with the 10s removed, leaving 48. The cards rank AKQJ98765432, Aces high. Card point values are: Ace 4, King 3, Queen 2 and Jack 1; remainder 0.

Cards are dealt out and whoever gets the J♥ chooses a seat and becomes the first dealer. The other draw for seats, a higher card having priority. The dealer antes 3 counters to the pot; the rest 2 each. Five cards are dealt, anticlockwise, each player receiving 11, except for the dealer who gets 12. The remaining 3 form the talon. Each player may exchange one card if desired and the dealer discards a card, so that all have 11 cards each. The four discards are set aside until the end.

The aim is to take the fewest points in tricks; the player with the most pays the one who scores the fewest. If two players tie, the earlier player (who is closer to the dealer's right) wins. (Note: Presumably if they tie with for highest, the later player loses; if they tie for lowest, the earlier one wins.) Winnings are calculated by totalling the points in the four discards and adding four, then paying this in counters. (Note: 1 point = 1 counter or basic stake.)

Alternatively, a player with a strong hand may try to win by taking all tricks; this is a Chapanka. The player sweeps the pot and is paid 32 counters by the player sitting opposite and 16 by each other player. A player who makes the first 9 tricks must play a Chapanka. If an opponent takes the penultimate trick, the Chapanka player pays that opponent what would otherwise have been won (i.e. 16 or 32); if the last trick is lost, the Chapanka player pays double (32 or 64); in either case, the player doubles the pot.

The highest card is the J♥, the Kinal, and a player who discards it onto a different suit earns 1 point from its captor. A player who forces out the Kinal by leading Hearts, is paid 2 points by the Kinal holder and 1 by each other player. A player who loses a Chapanka in either of the last two tricks having discarded the J♥, is still paid for Kinal. (Note: Kinal is the Polish equivalent of the Quinola in the French game.)

A player with 4 Aces or 3 Aces and Kinal has a Pancerola which earns the right to renounce the led suit for the first 9 tricks, but it comes with a commitment to lose every trick. A Pancerola player who takes either of the last two tricks pays the entire loss alone. The Pancerola player may choose not to exercise the right to renounce and may play a Chapanka.

A player who discards an Ace onto another suit receives 1 point from its captor and 2 for the A♦. All penalty payments are doubled for the player opposite or in the last trick. Although not mentioned by Gracz, it is probable that if Kinal was discarded successfully it earned the contents of the pot in addition to the side payments and if it was forced out, the holder had to double the pot and pay the side payments.

== Bibliography ==
- Drużbacka, Elźbieta, z Kowalskich (1752). Zebranie Rytmov przez Wierszopisow Zyiacych lub Nassego wieku Zesslych. Warsaw: Mci and Rzeczypospol.
- Gołębiowski,Łukasz (1831). Gry i Zabawy Różnych Stanów w Kraju Całym, Lub Niektórych Tylko Prowincyach. Warsaw.
- Gracz, Wytrawny ["Consummate Player"] (1930). Gry w Karty. Polskie i Obce. Nowego Wydawnictwa, Warsaw, reprinted 2012.
