= German-suited playing cards =

Card deck used in Germany

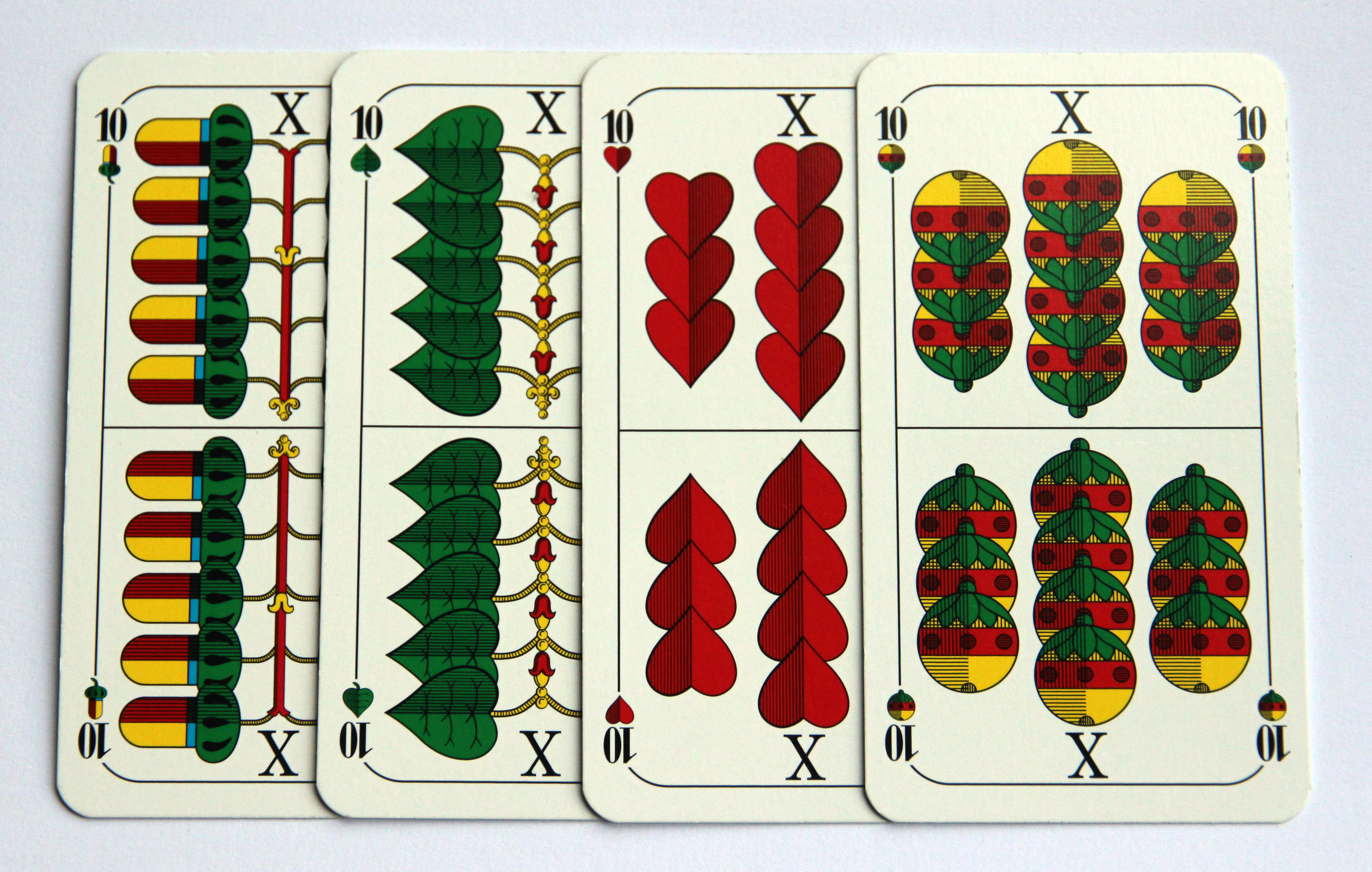
Tens of the Bavarian pattern in the four German suits of Acorns, Leaves, Hearts and Bells

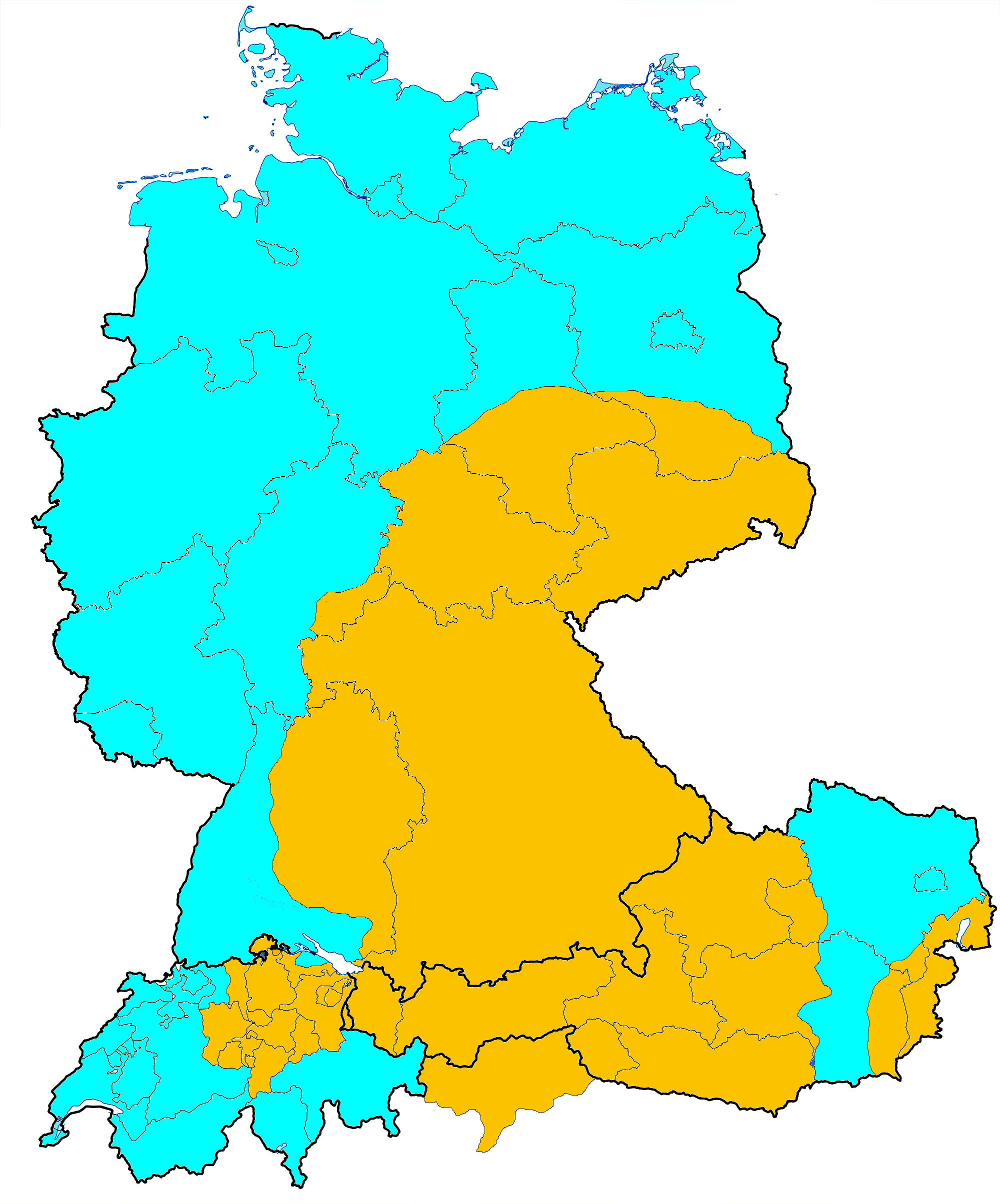
Distribution of German and Swiss-German suits (orange) and French suits (cyan) in Germany, Austria, South Tyrol, Switzerland and Liechtenstein

German-suited playing cards are a very common style of traditional playing card used in many parts of Central Europe characterised by 32- or 36-card packs with the suits of Acorns (Eichel or Kreuz), Leaves (Grün, Blatt, Laub, Pik or Gras), Hearts (Herz or Rot) and Bells (Schelle, Schell or Bolle). The German suit system is one of the oldest, becoming standard around 1450 and, a few decades later, influencing the design of the now international French suit system of Clubs, Spades, Hearts and Diamonds. Today German-suited playing cards are common in south and east Germany, Austria, German-speaking Switzerland, Liechtenstein, north Italy, Hungary, Czech Republic, Slovakia, Slovenia, Croatia, Bosnia, northern Serbia (Vojvodina province), southern Poland and central and western Romania and Siebenbürgen (Romania).

== History ==
Playing cards (Spielkarten) originally entered German-speaking lands around the late 1370s. The earliest cards were probably Latin-suited like those used in Italy and Spain. After much experimentation, the cards settled into the four aforementioned suits around 1450. Closely related Swiss playing cards are used in German-speaking Switzerland. The French suit symbols, well known internationally and especially in English-speaking countries, were derived from the German ones around 1480.

German-suited packs originally had four court cards per suit (King, Queen, Ober and Unter), but the Queen was dropped in the early 16th century. The ten was often depicted with a banner and known as the Banner or Panier; this survives in Swiss-suited cards, but died out in Germany in the mid-16th century, although it continued to be called by the name Panier until at least 1783. The Aces had been dropped even earlier, probably by the 1470s, leaving the standard German pack with 48 cards; the Deuce being promoted into the gap left by the Ace. During the 18th century, the 48-card pack was further reduced to 36, although there is evidence of 48-card, so-called 'Karniffel' packs being sold until the first half of the 19th century in places.

German-suited cards spread throughout Europe into areas that were either part of the Holy Roman Empire (Kingdom of Bavaria, Saxony, Habsburg Erblande, Bohemia, Moravia, Silesia) or Kingdom of Hungary.

This area is now distributed in modern states of Austria, Czech Republic, Croatia, south east of Germany, Hungary, northern Italy (in the region of South Tyrol), southern Poland, western Romania (in the regions of Transylvania and Banat), northern Serbia (in the region of Vojvodina), Slovenia, Slovakia, and southwestern Ukraine (in the region of Transcarpathia), bordering Hungary.

They were also produced and used as far east as Russia until the early 20th century. German-suited decks are still well known all over these countries although they have been undergoing strong competition from French playing cards since the late 17th century.

Until the Thirty Years' War (1618–1648), German-suited cards were used in all German-speaking regions of Europe. However, the war saw French-suited cards being introduced through the movement of soldiers and they eventually ousted the German cards across large parts of the German nation. North of the River Main only the Prussian-Silesian pattern, common in Prussia, was able to hold on. After its annexation by Prussia in the 18th century, Silesia began to use the Prussian pattern cards instead of the hitherto dominant Austrian pattern. Today, the most common pattern of cards used in much of Germany are the French-suited, Berlin pattern, although German-suited cards are also widely used in some regions.

Traditional card games in which German suits are used include Binokel, Doppelkopf, Gaigel, Schafkopf, Skat, Bavarian Tarock and Watten.

== Composition ==
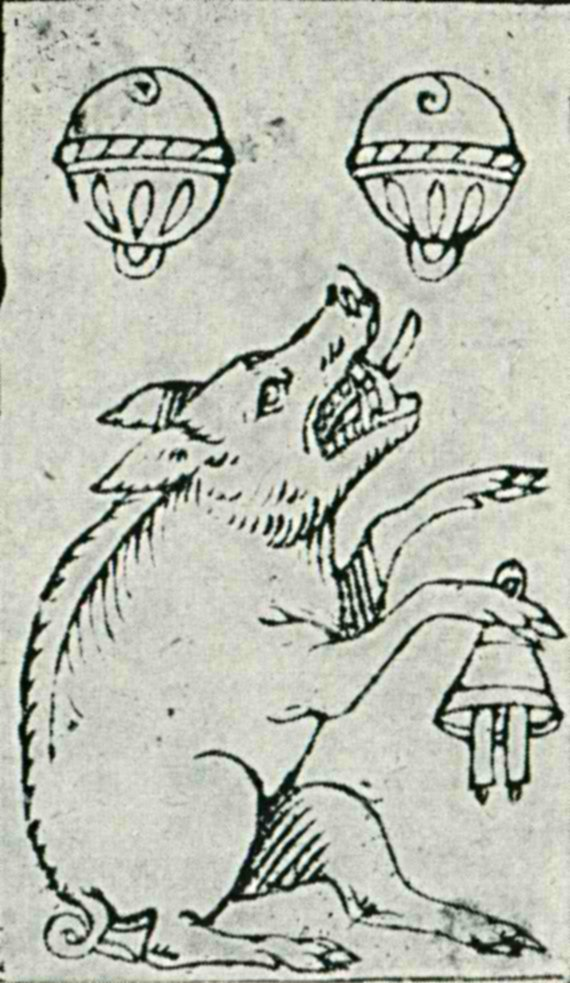
Sau (Deuce) of Bells, 1573

Suits	Hearts	Bells	Acorns	Leaves
Suits	Herzen	Schellen	Eicheln	Blätter
Most of Germany				
Northern; Germany				

German suited decks tend to have fewer cards than either the French, Spanish, or Italian sets. The typical northern German pack has 32 cards ranking from 7, 8, 9, 10, Under Knave (Unter = Untermann i.e. subordinate, underling or sergeant), Over Knave (Ober = Obermann i.e. superordinate, overlord or officer), King (König), and "Ace" (Ass) for a total of 32 cards. The "Ace" is really a Deuce (Daus) as indicated by its two suit symbols. Today, however, it is rarely if ever called a Daus. Southern patterns have 36 cards by including the 6. In South Tyrol, 40-card, German-suited packs are still produced so that Italian games can be played with them. In 2019, ASS Altenburger produced a double 52-card, German-suited pack for the game of Rommé. However, uniquely, it had Queens and Jacks instead of Obers and Unters.

In Bavaria, Austria and South Tyrol, the 6 of Bells (or sometimes the 7 of Bells where there is no 6) is known as the Weli or Belle which is often used as a wild card. The Weli first appeared around 1855 in the discontinued Tyrolean pattern and later the Salzburg and Tell patterns. The 7 of Bells is sometimes known as the Belli and the 7 of Acorns as the Spitz or Soacher and they are of comparable use, with the Weli being the higher card. For instance, in the Bavarian Watten game the top three cards following the respective trump ace are – in descending order: Maxi (= the King of Hearts, nicknamed after Bavaria's first King), Belli (or Welli) and Spitz. With the exception of the New Altenburg pattern, all cards with the rank of 10 include the Roman numeral X at the top centre of the card.

The Ace in German and Swiss German sets have a peculiar history. Aces disappeared from German decks during the 15th century. When the Ace was promoted above the King in French packs during the 16th century, the Deuce did so as well in Germany leading to the conflation of the Ace and Deuce. This is why in most packs the Ace depicts two pips and is also called a Daus (deuce). Confusion is avoided when the 7 or 6 became the lowest card in most packs during the 17th and 18th centuries. Players also avoid confusion by alternatively calling the Ace/Deuce a Sau (sow).

== Patterns ==
Many regions have their own pattern (Bild) which features their own unique artwork or number of cards. Some patterns are descended from much earlier ones like the Saxon pattern which can trace their ancestry to the 15th-century Stukeley type cards named after their identifier, William Stukeley, in 1763.

=== Northern ===
Northern patterns include the Saxon pattern, in old, new and double-figured variants, the Lower Saxon pattern and the two types of Prussian, or Prussian-Silesian, pattern. Most were originally produced with 36 cards but this was reduced to 32 cards after the spread of Skat. In northern patterns, the acorns are red.

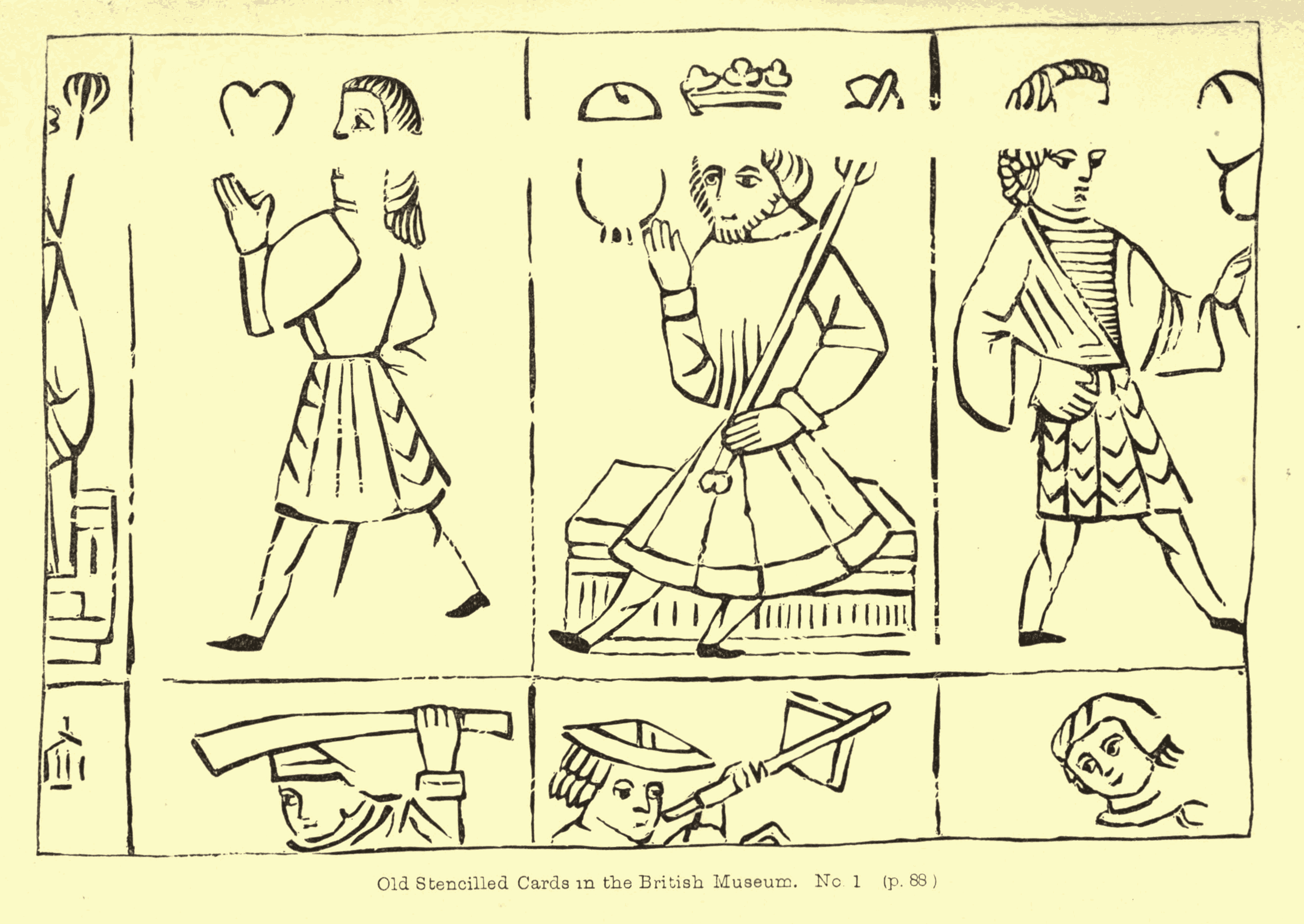
Stukeley cards

==== Saxon pattern ====
The only traditional northern pattern still in regular production in Germany is the Saxon pattern where only pip cards have corner indices. However, Saxon pattern cards of various designs have been produced for over 500 years for the German-speaking region bounded roughly by the Elbe and Saale rivers and by the Ore Mountains to the south. This region is represented by the modern German states of Saxony and Thuringia, the latter historically falling under Saxon rule. Historically they were called Schwerterkarte, "sword cards", referring to the two or three swords displayed on some of the cards, a symbol of the electoral status of the dukes of Saxony.

The modern double-ended Saxon pattern is the product of a long evolution from the primitive Stukeley type cards imported from Nuremberg. Wolfgang Suma identified four stages of development:

- Nuremberg pattern, Stukeley type, imported in the late 15th century. Later called Ruimpf cards after the game.
- Cavalier cards, developed in the first half of the 18th century probably in Leipzig
- Schwerterkarte (Sword cards), first appeared 1800, became double-ended in late 19th century. (Note: The current double-ended Saxon cards first appeared about 1910–1920.)
- East German pattern, designed 1963–1964.

===== Ruimpf cards =====
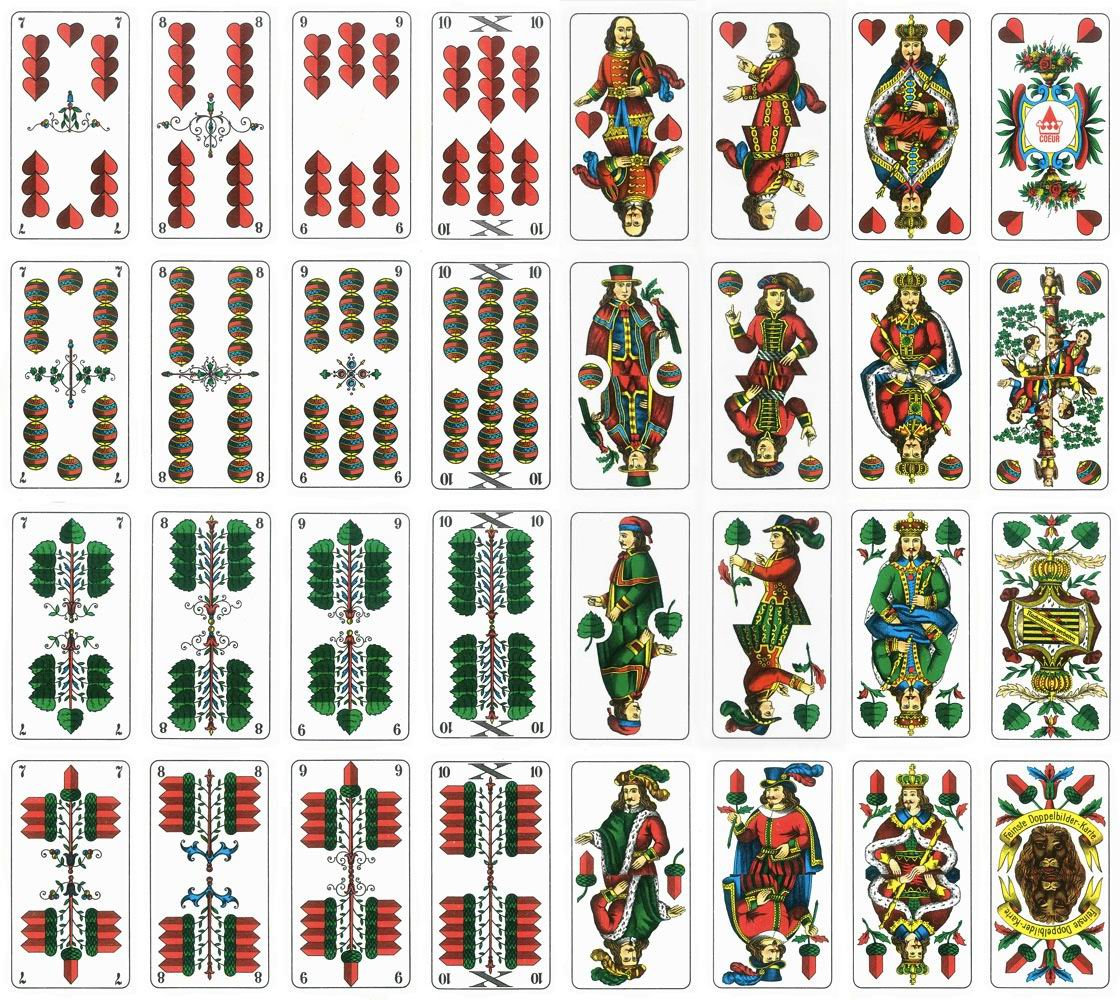
Saxon pattern

In Saxony and Thuringia there was also a pack known as Ruimpf cards (Rümpffkarte or Rümpfkarte) that was produced from the 16th to the 18th century, before being replaced by the Saxon pattern. Ruimpf or Ruempf (German: Rümpfspiel or Rümpffen) was the name of a game for which the precise rules are unknown. Ruimpf cards are believed to have originated in south Germany and destined for export to the Ore Mountains. They were narrower than the almost square cards of the older Nuremberg pattern (see below).

===== Schwerterkarte =====
The older variant of the Saxon single-headed pattern originated in Leipzig and Dresden in the early 19th century, being typified by the Schwerterkarte, named after the crossed swords on the coat of arms of the Deuces of Acorns. Replicas of this early type are still made, for example the 1835 example produced by Altenburger. A newer, more elaborate, variant emerged in the early 19th century. Both designs feature a great lion on the Acorn Deuce, lovers being surprised on the Deuce of Bells and the Unter of Bells holding a tame bird. The pip cards feature a range of ornamental scenes from animals, legendary and real, to biblical scenes. The latter fell away in the double-headed versions that came into vogue at the end of the 19th century and are still in production today.

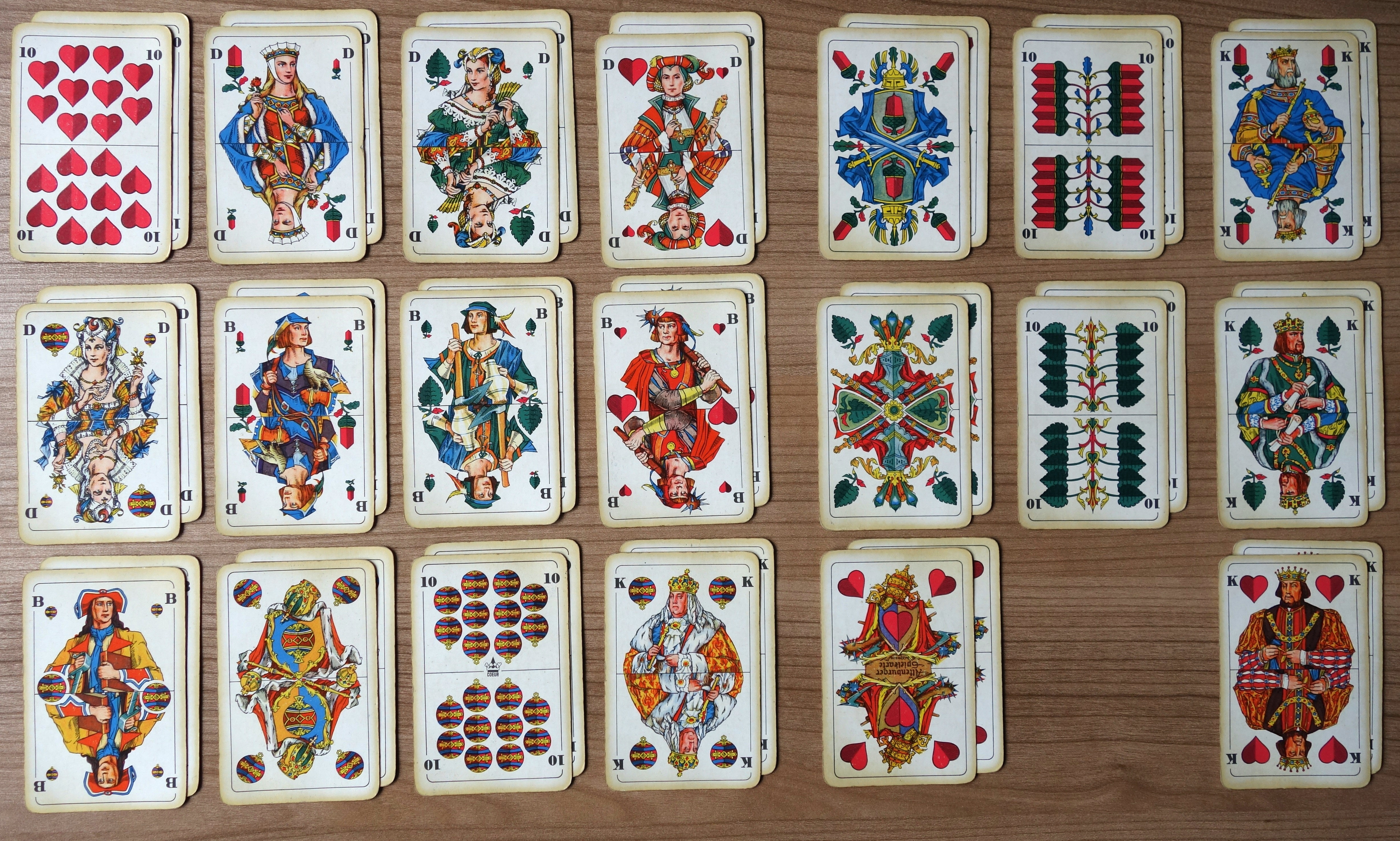
East German pattern (Doppelkopf picture cards)

===== East German pattern =====
These older northern patterns have been eclipsed by the double-headed New Altenburg, New German or East German pattern, created by Walter Krauss (1908–1985) in the former East Germany, which added corner indices to every card but the Aces and cleverly changed the dimensions of the cards to match those of standard poker or rummy cards. In 2018, ASS Altenburger (ASS) launched the first 52-card, German-suited pack to be manufactured for several centuries as part of a Rommé set comprising 2 packs of 52 cards plus 2 jokers each. This limited edition of 1000 sets was sold out almost immediately and so, in 2019, ASS published a revised set taking account of customer feedback. Despite being German-suited, the cards featured Queens and Jacks instead of Obers and Unters. In addition, there are Twos as well as Deuces (called Aces). The Queens had also been designed by Krauss originally, but they were unpopular, and such version with Queens instead of Obers is otherwise no longer in print.

==== Prussian-Silesian pattern ====
Polish pattern

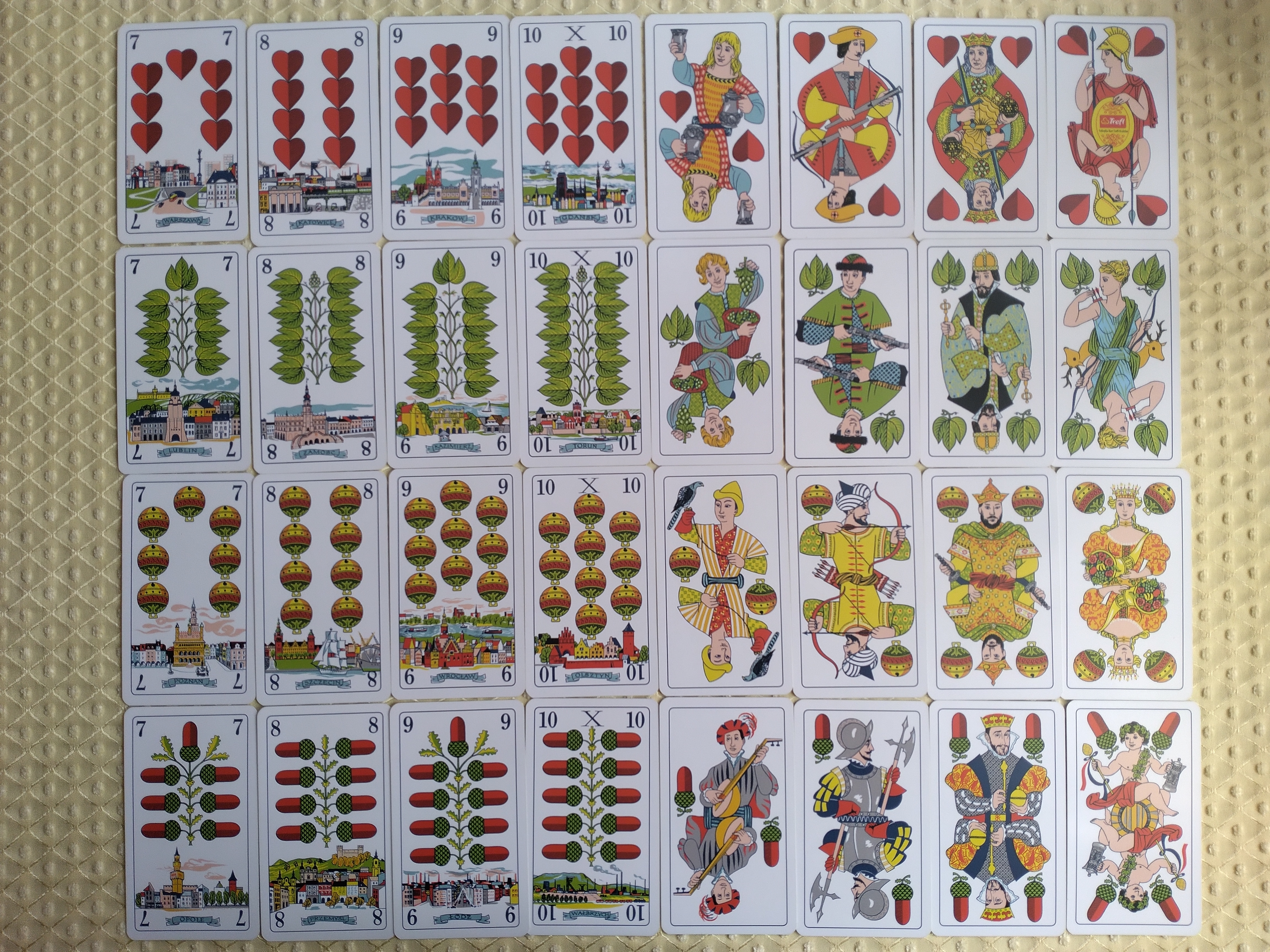
Pip cards in the Polish pattern feature Polish cities, whereas aces - women.

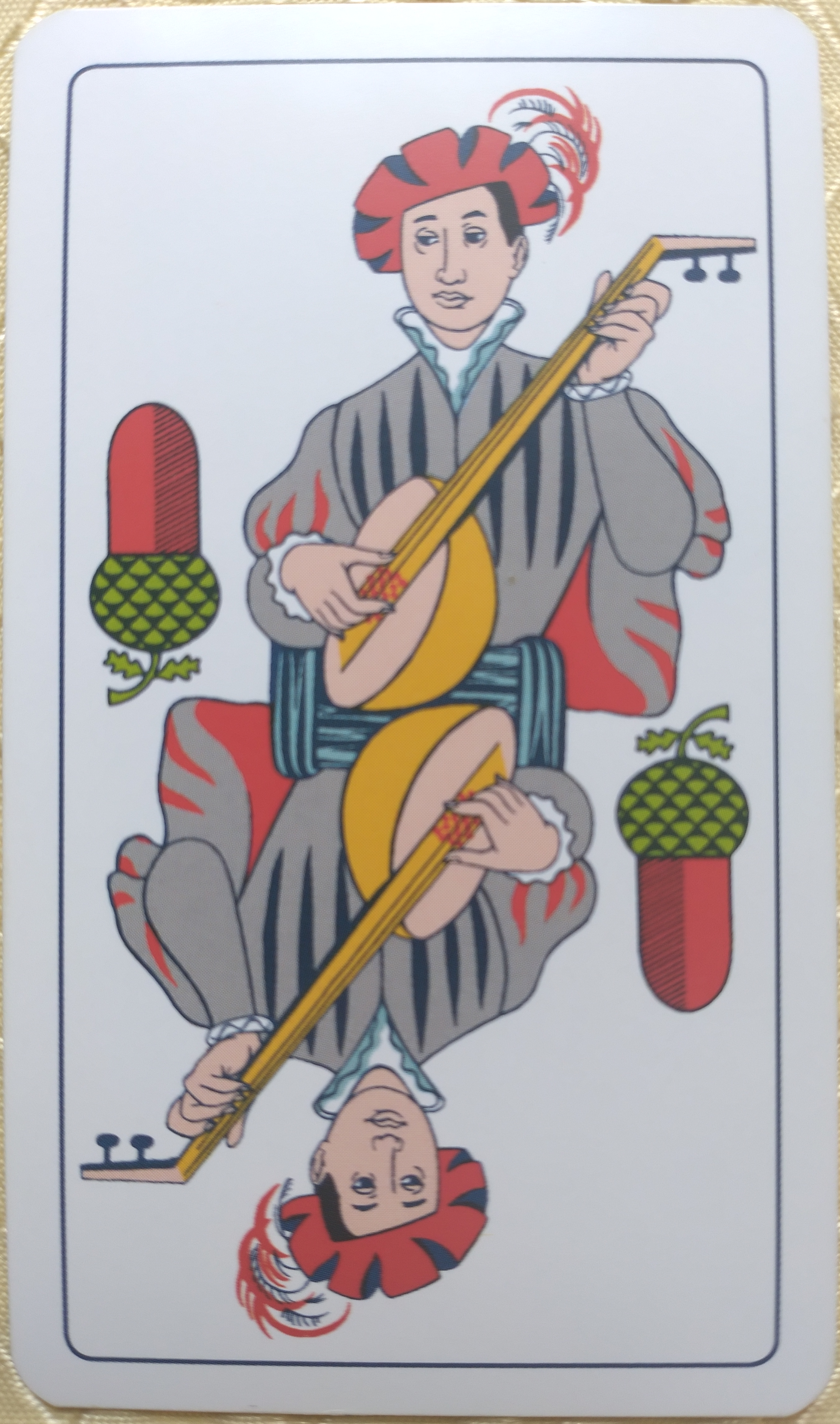
Unter of Acorns

Meanwhile, for over a century the Prussian pattern has been the most common German-suited pattern in Poland, though nowadays it is usually associated only with Skat, which is played mostly in Upper Silesia. The regular German version of this pattern was produced in Poland up to the mid-1960s, when it was then replaced by a modification (usually called the Silesian pattern), designed by Franciszek Bunsch in the early 1960s, while packs featuring it have been produced since 1963. or various types of Prussian double-headed pattern, are still produced as special editions.

Court cards in the Prussian-Silesian pattern are symmetrical. Pip cards feature cities or towns. Pip cards in the Polish pattern feature Polish cities. Additionally aces in the Polish tradition are women.

=== Southern ===
Franconian pattern

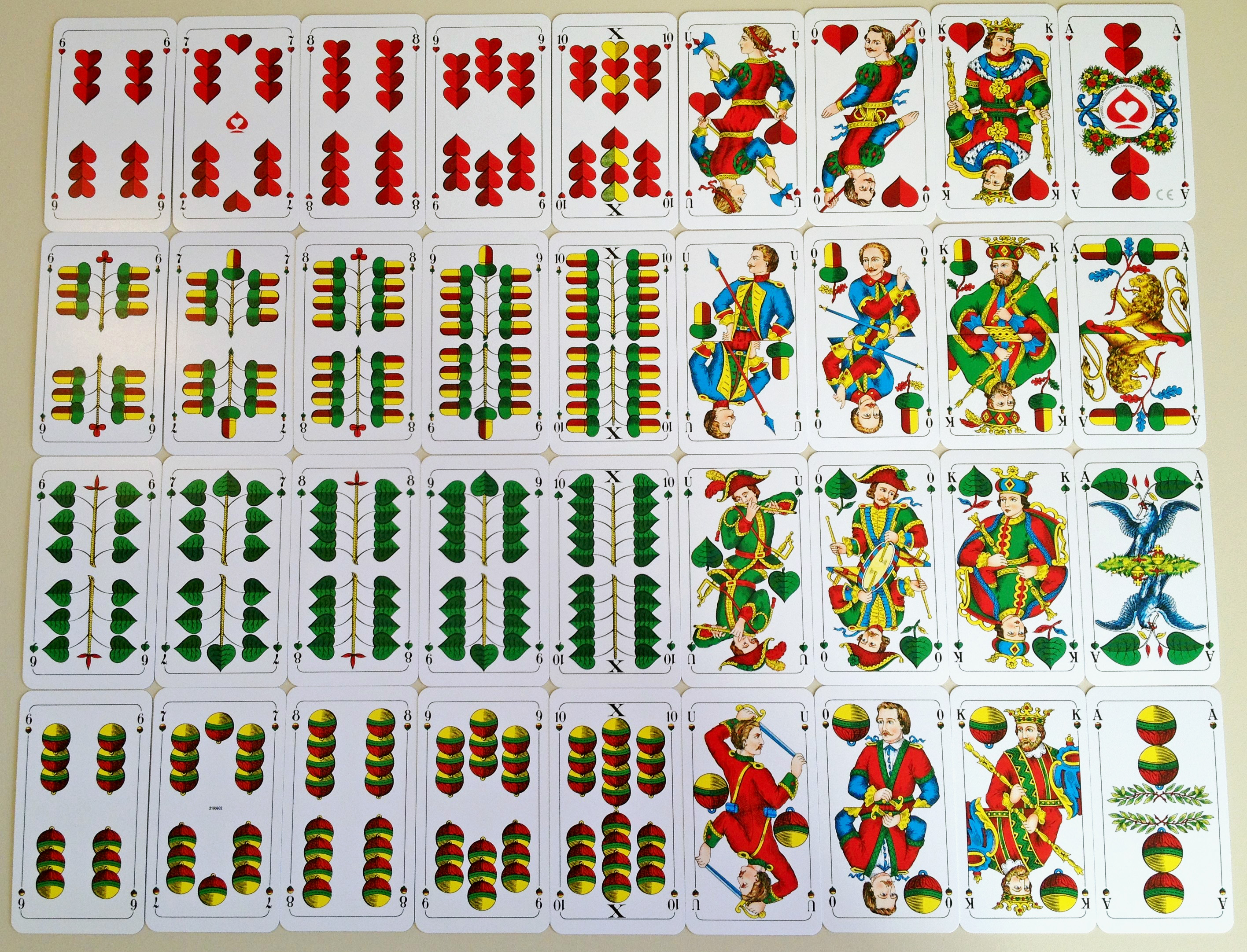
Full deck

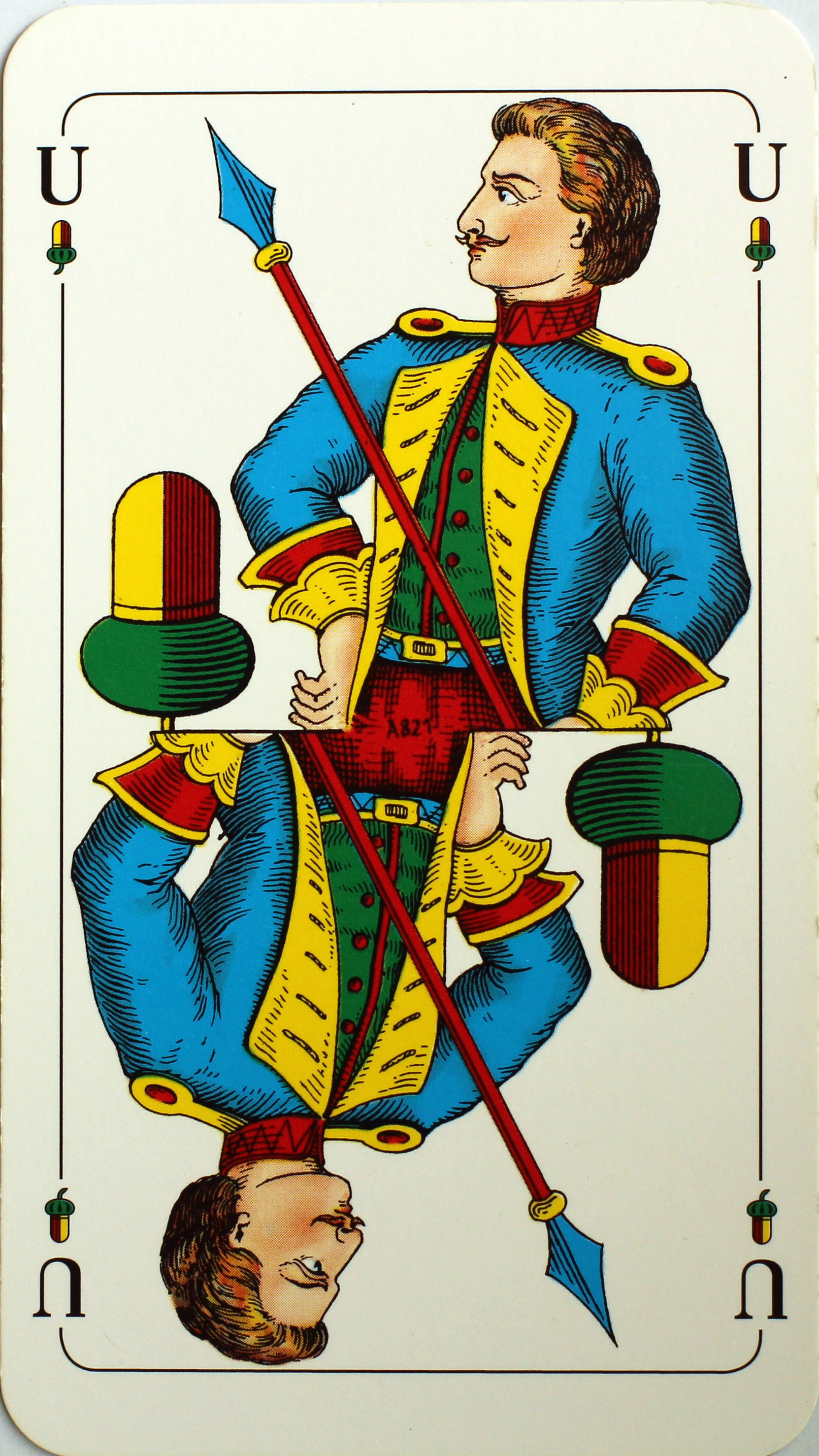
Unter of Acorns

Salzburg pattern

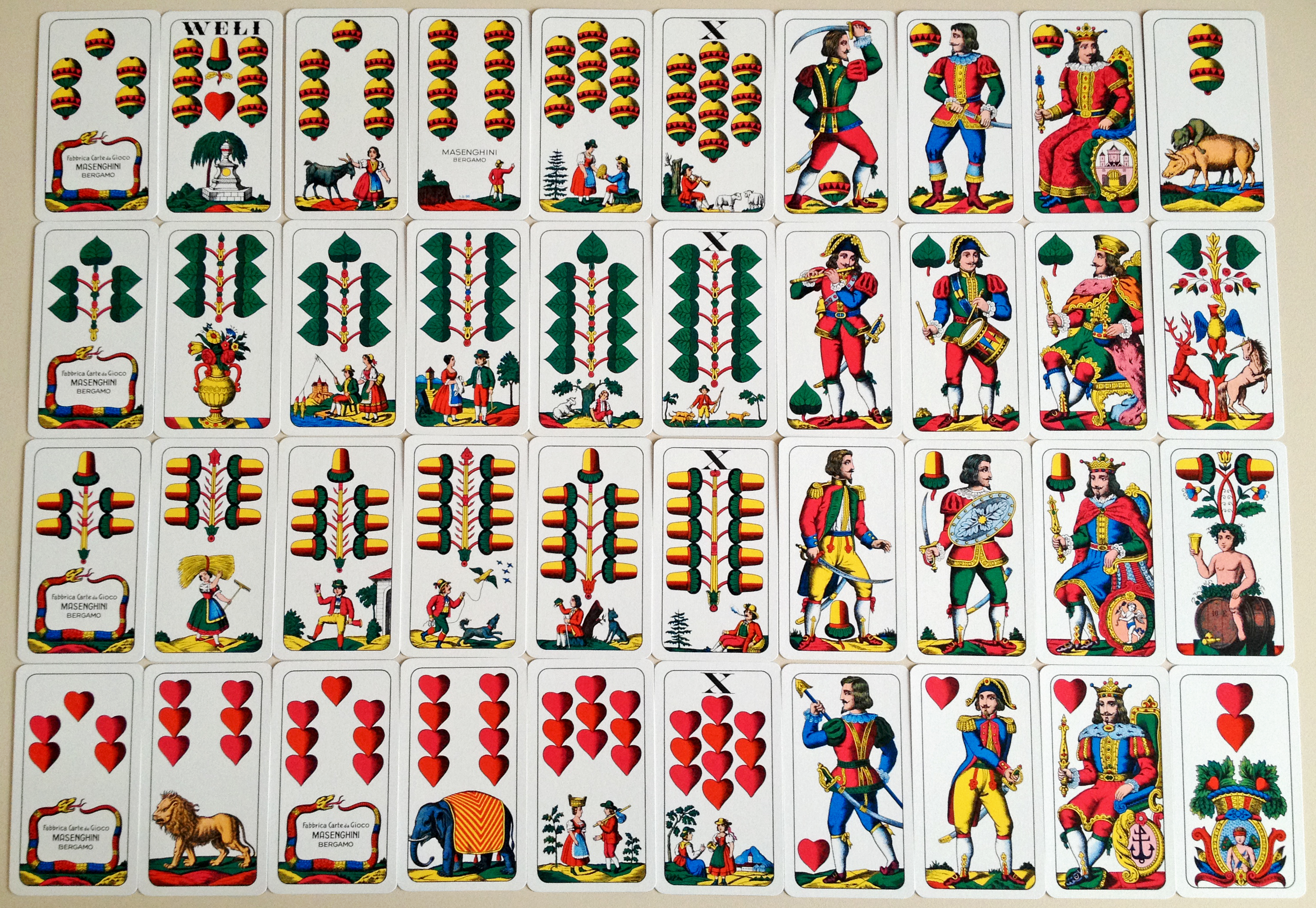
Full deck

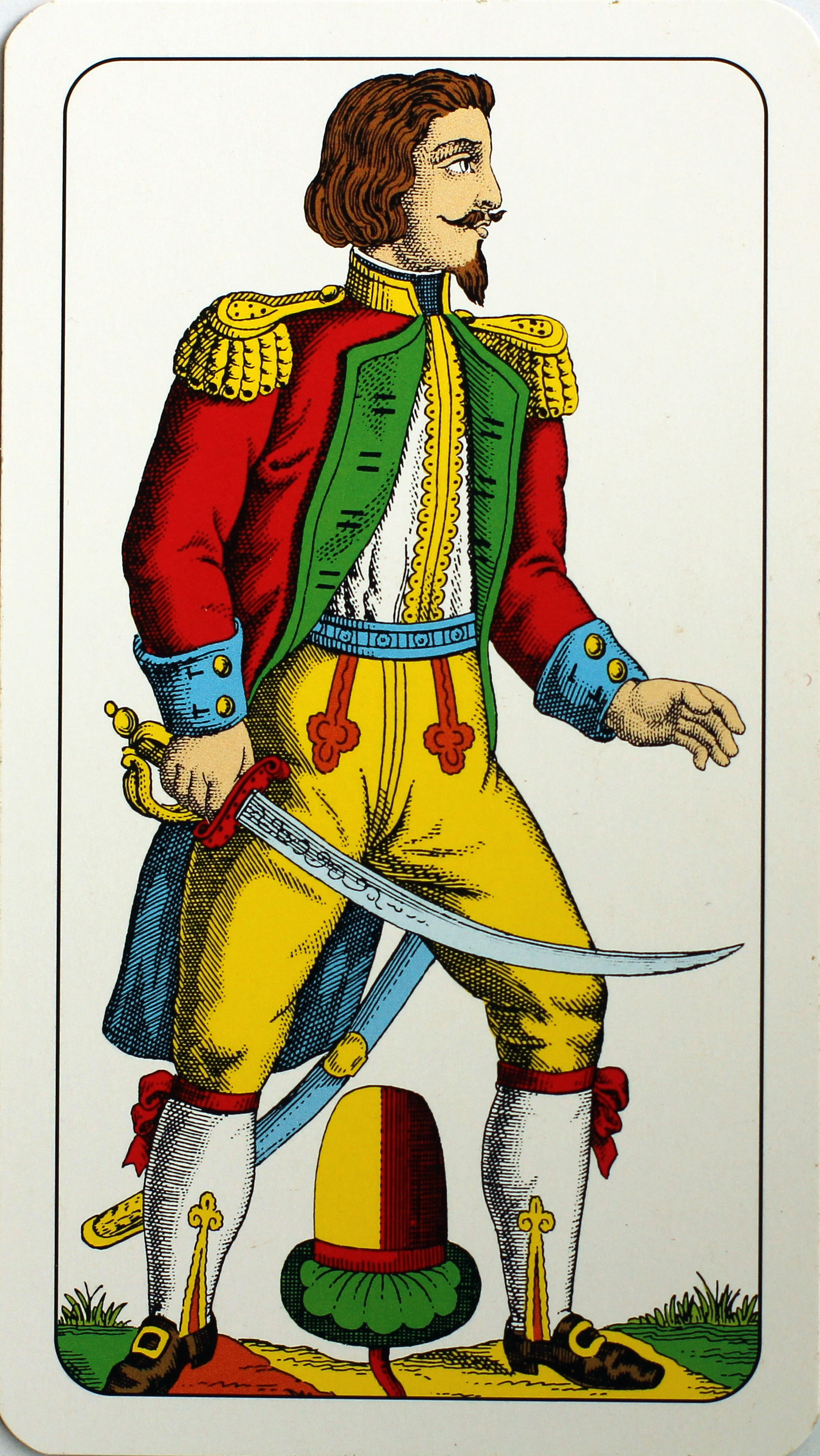
Unter of Acorns

The 36 card Bavarian (Munich and Stralsund types), Franconian, and Salzburg (or einfachdeutsche) patterns are descended from the Old Bavarian pattern which itself goes back to the 15th-century Augsburg pattern. In all variants the Obers and Unters are portrayed as fighters, with the Ober and Unter of Leaves carrying a drum and fife respectively. Bavarian cards have an aspect ratio of roughly 2:1. In the non-reversible (Einfach) pattern which used to be commonplace, various pictorial designs were used, especially on the pip cards. These individual scenes are now only found on the Deuces (also called Twos, Sows, or Aces). Since the 1980s, Italian manufacturers have included 5s into their Salzburg decks to allow the German speaking South Tyroleans to play Italian card games that require 40 cards with suits they are more familiar with. Salzburg decks also inherited the "Weli" from its extinct sibling, the Tyrolean pattern. The Salzburg pattern remains non-reversible and lacks corner indices. Most games require only 32 cards by excluding the 6s such as Schafkopf. Games that require the full deck include Bavarian Tarock, Jass, Tapp and some versions of Watten.

Patterns that are still printed:

- Bavarian Doppelbild, Munich type
- Bavarian Doppelbild, Stralsund type
- Franconian reversible pattern
- Bohemian (or Prague) pattern
- Salzburg pattern - in Austria called the Single German pattern ("einfachdeutsch") as opposed to the Double German pattern ("doppeldeutsch")

Patterns that have ceased printing:

- Ansbach or Nuremberg (narrow type) pattern
- Old Bavarian pattern (common predecessor) with variants in Poland and Russia
- Bavarian-Swabian pattern
- Isarkreis pattern (predecessor of the Salzburg pattern)
- Lemberg pattern
- Nuremberg pattern (wide type)
- Nuremberg Eagle (coat of arms) cards
- Regensburg pattern (predecessor of the Bohemian pattern)
- Tyrolean pattern
- Polish pattern

Bohemian pattern

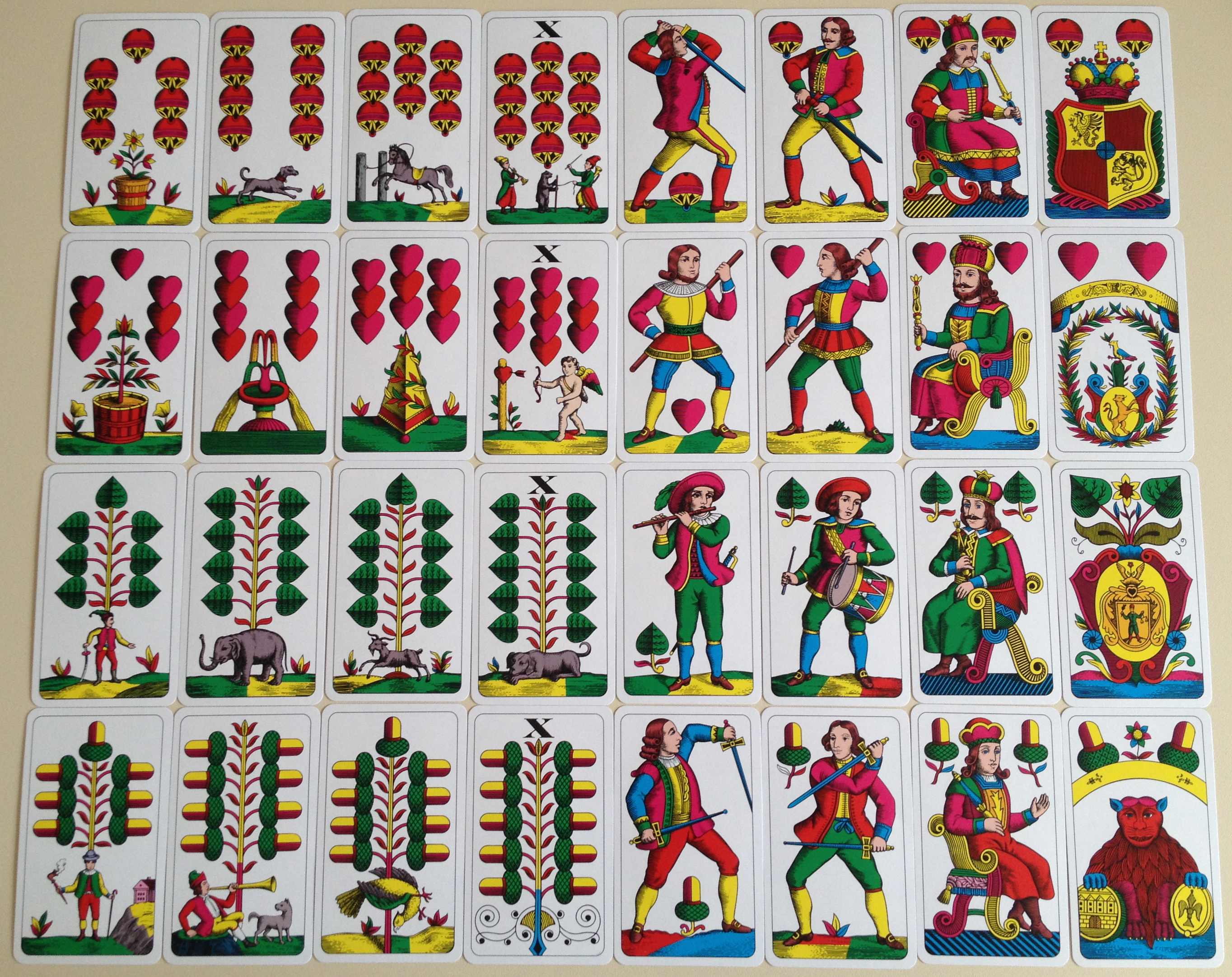
Full deck

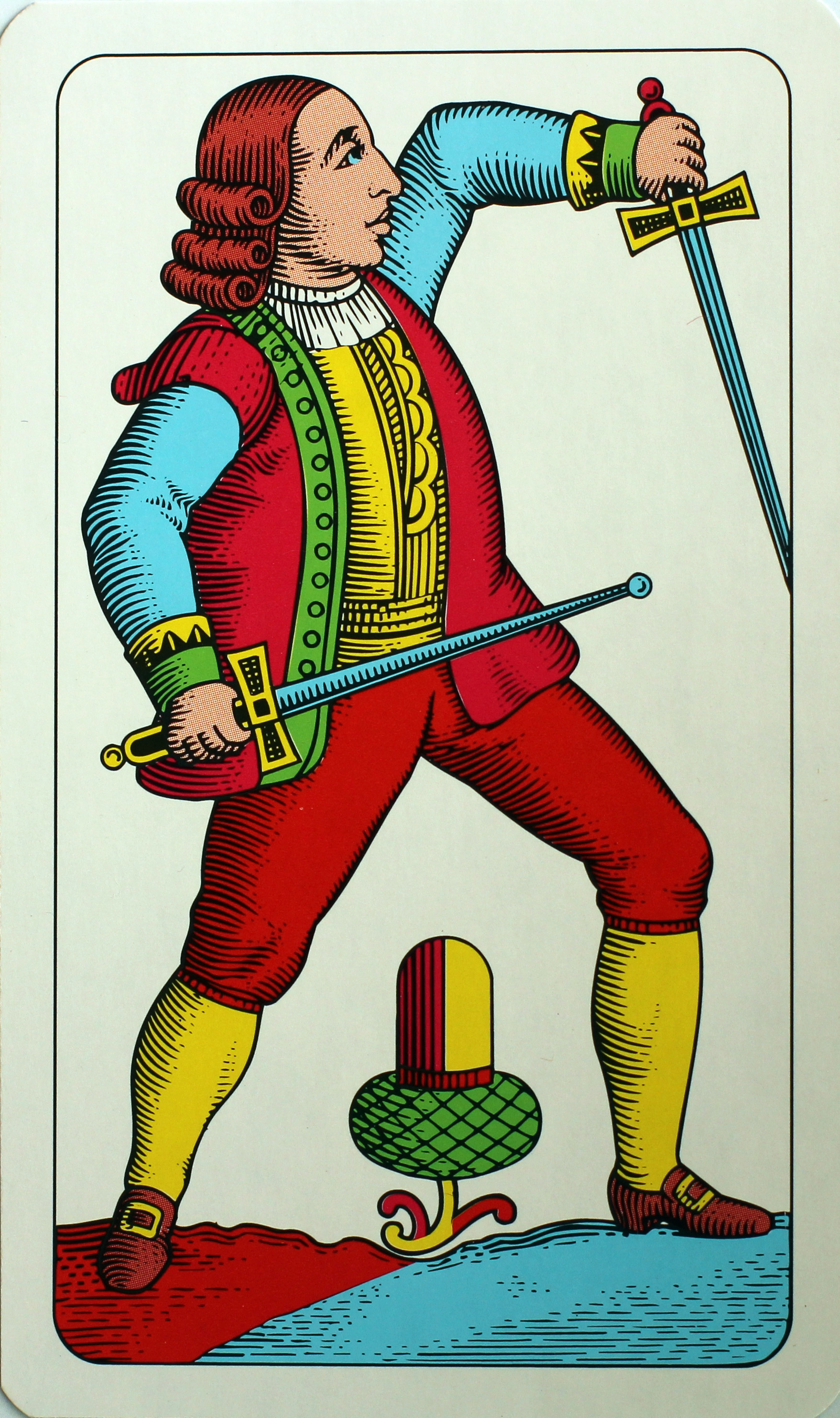
Unter of Acorns

The Bohemian (or Prague) pattern pack is the standard one still used in the Bohemian part of the Czech Republic. (Note: In the Moravian part of the Czech Republic, Tell cards are preferred.) It is closely related to the Salzburg pattern of Austria and thus is also descended from the Old Bavarian – one of the oldest German-suited packs – but there are only 32 cards in the pack, like the northern ones. The cards are single-headed and lack corner indices. and are used for playing traditional regional games. The Knaves represent soldiers and hold spears, halberds or swords or, in the case of the suit of Leaves, are depicted playing a fife or drum. The Kings are seated and come with two suit marks like the Deuces. The pip cards have miniature scenes of animals or rural life. Today the pattern is still produced by Společnost Hrací Karty 1884.

==== Origins ====
The Augsburg pattern was one of the two ancestors (the other being the Ulm-Munich pattern) of the present Bavarian pattern pack and appeared around 1500. The four kings sitting on thrones are each accompanied by two armed servants. The Ober and Unter of Leaves are military musicians, the Ober is a bagpipe-playing fool; the Unter is playing a 'fanfare' or flute. The Ober and Unter of Hearts are armed with polearms, the Ober and Unter of Bells with swords, The Ober and Unter of Acorns carry a mace and bossed shield.

In the middle of the 17th century, after the Thirty Years' War, the Augsburg pattern changed into the so-called Old Bavarian pattern. The Ober and Unter of Acorns were now each armed with a sword and parrying dagger. The Ober and Unter of Leaves now carried a drum and fife respectively; from now on the drummer and fifer became the distinguishing feature of the Bavarian pattern. Obers and Unters of the same suit were armed, as in a fencing school, with the same weapons. In this period the number of cards was reduced from the former 48 (the One – Ace – had already disappeared) to 36 (the Three, Four and Five were removed; the Two or Deuce already outranked the King by that time), probably due to paper shortages. In the late 17th century, during the Turkish Wars, the Kings of Leaves and Acorns swapped their crowns for turbans. The Deuces depicted various scenes. The Deuce of Leaves had a pyramid with a unicorn, deer and eagle; the Deuce of Acorns depicted Bacchus, the Deuce of Bells had a wild boar being attacked by a hunting dog and, on the Deuce of Hearts was usually a Cupid. Around 1750 this pattern became widespread across the whole old Bavarian region. Smaller variations of this pattern became common in Congress Poland from 1918.

==== Modern Bavarian patterns ====
Bavarian patterns

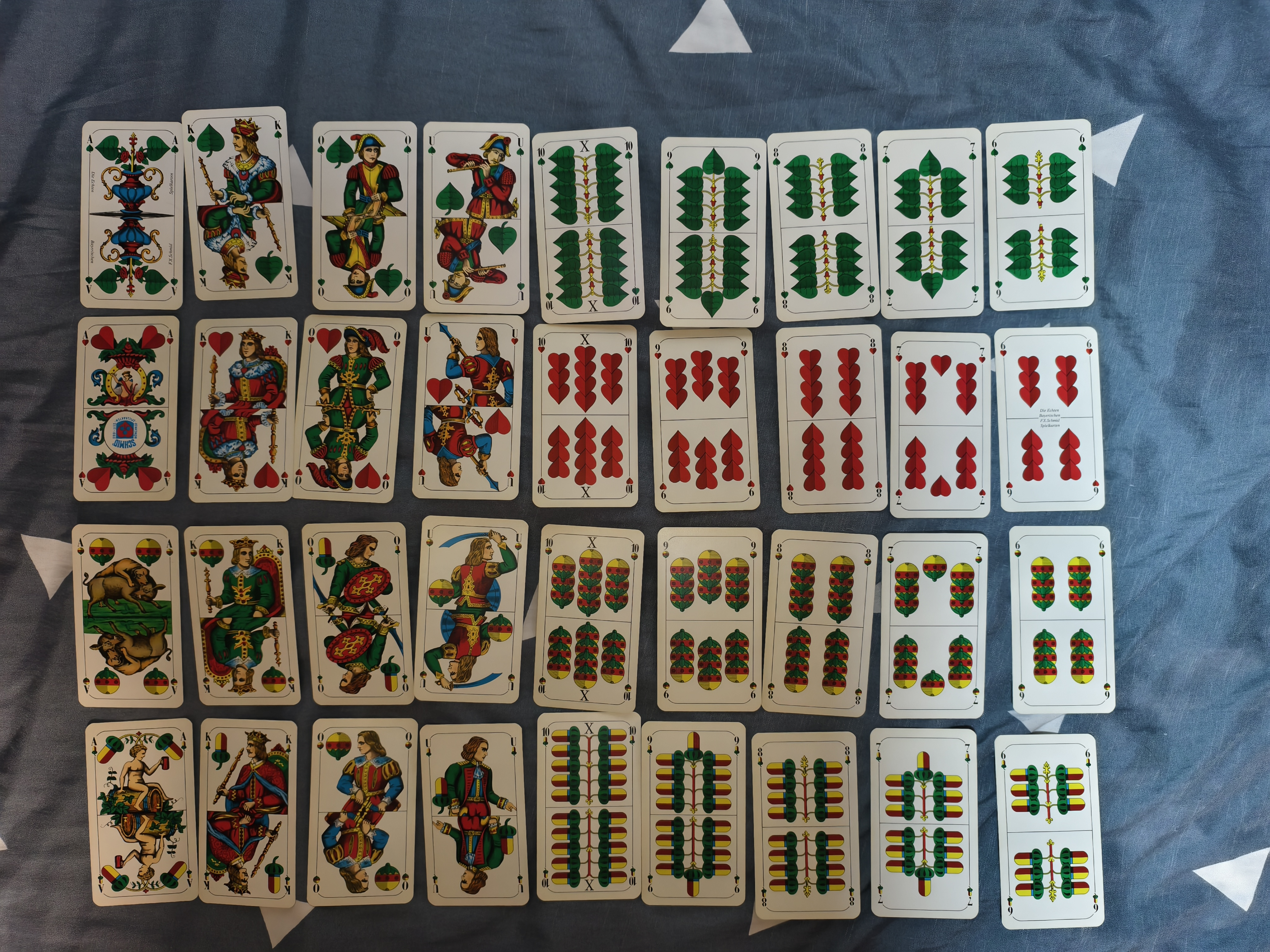
Full Deck

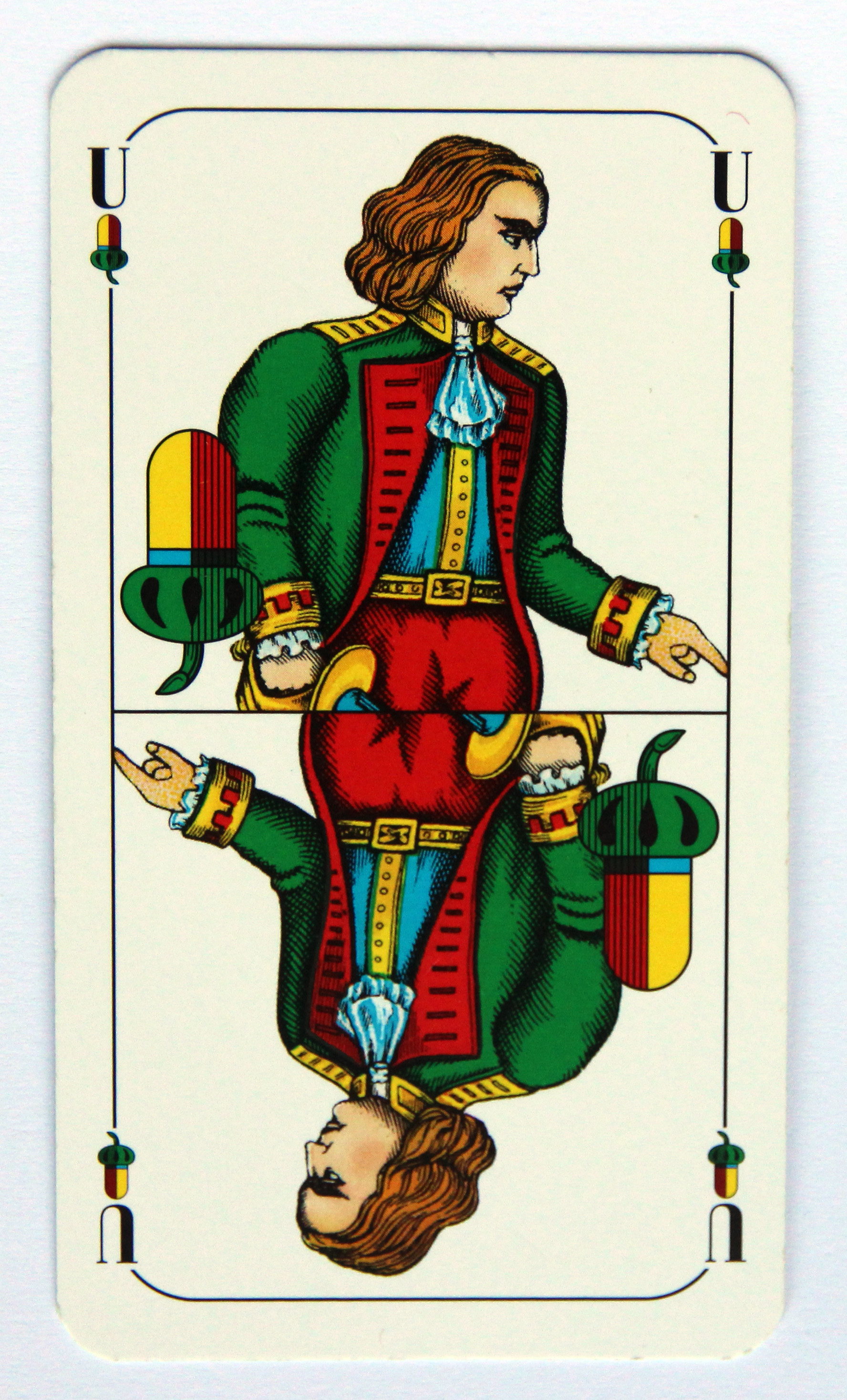
Unter of Acorns

In the newly formed Kingdom of Bavaria, the Old Bavarian pattern changed after 1810 into the Modern Bavarian pattern. A vase now appears on the Deuce of Leaves and the King of Acorns was given a crown again, leaving the King of Leaves as the only 'oriental' figure. The Ober of Heart has now exchanged his polearm for a sword on which he rests. The Ober and Unter of Acorns now only carry one weapon, however, Ober of Acorns also carries an oval shield. This type, designed by Munich card maker, Josef Fetscher, draughted by Frankfurt card maker, C. L. Wüst, and manufactured around 1854, is known today as the Munich type of the Bavarian pattern. It has been widely used thanks to its production by the playing-card manufacturers, F. X. Schmid. In 1882, the United Altenburger und Stralsunder Spielkarten-Fabriken printed their own version of the Bavarian pattern, which went back to a design by Frankfurt card manufacturer's Lennhoff & Heuser. The Kings, Obers and Unters were dressed in fantasy uniforms in the style of historicism. Essential distinguishing features of this Stralsund type of the Bavarian pattern from its Munich type are:

- The Ober of Leaves carries the drum on his right knee instead of the left.
- The Unter of Acorns wears a beret.
- The Ober of Acorns has a pointed shield instead of an oval one.
- The Bacchus on the Deuce of Acorn has a beer mug instead of a wine goblet.
- The Cupid has butterfly wings.

In the 20th century, the pip and court cards were gradually marked with indices and the misprinting of Deuces with the letter A, instead of the more accurate D, prevailed.

After the Second World War, the previously dominant non-reversible cards finally disappeared and were replaced by the reversible designs that are still widespread today. Non-reversible versions are occasionally reprinted but for the interest of collectors as opposed for gaming. For example, in 1980, ASS produced a limited run of non-reversible packs of the Munich type for export to West Germany.

==== Württemberg ====
Württemberg pattern

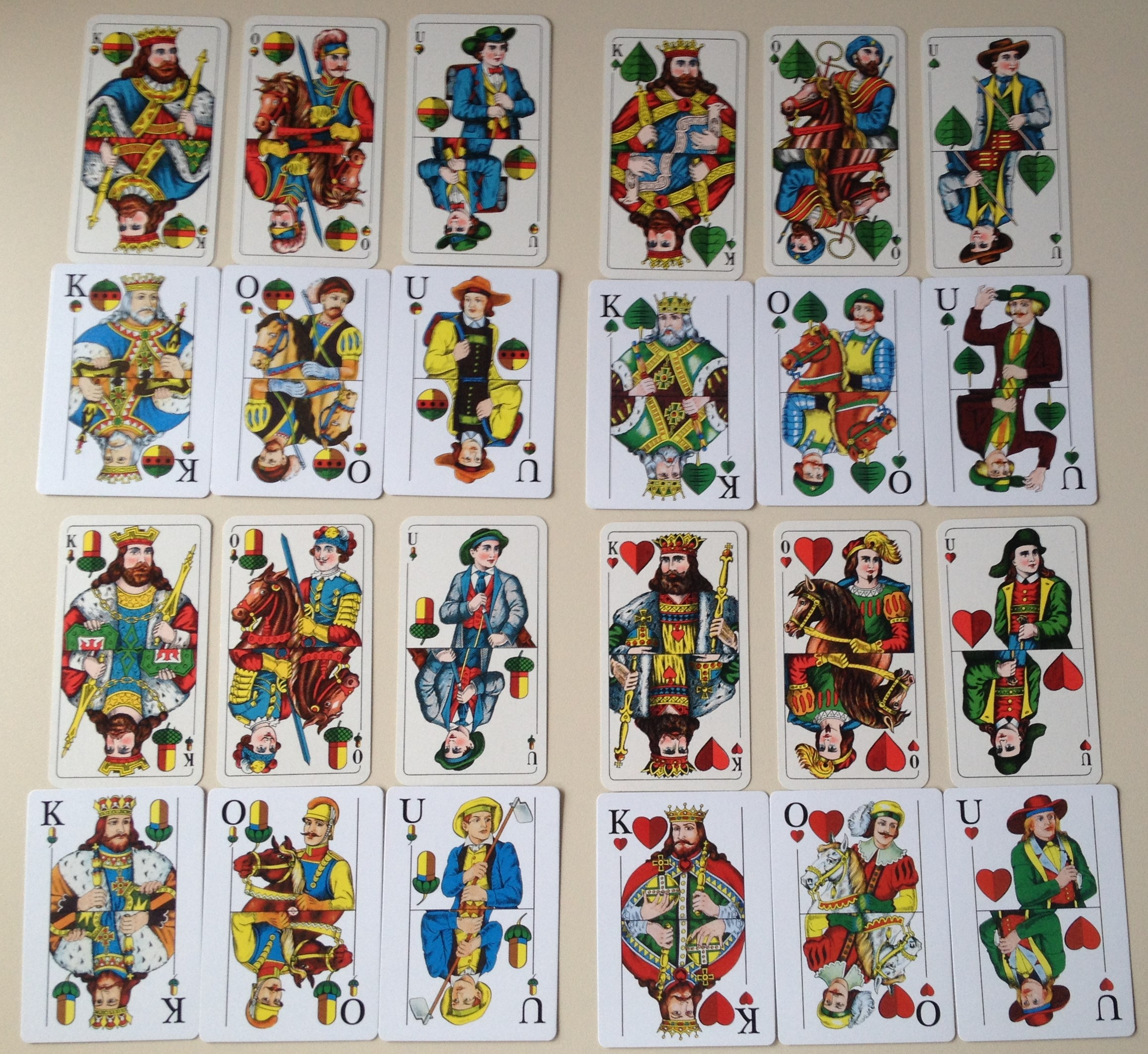
Courts: old and new types

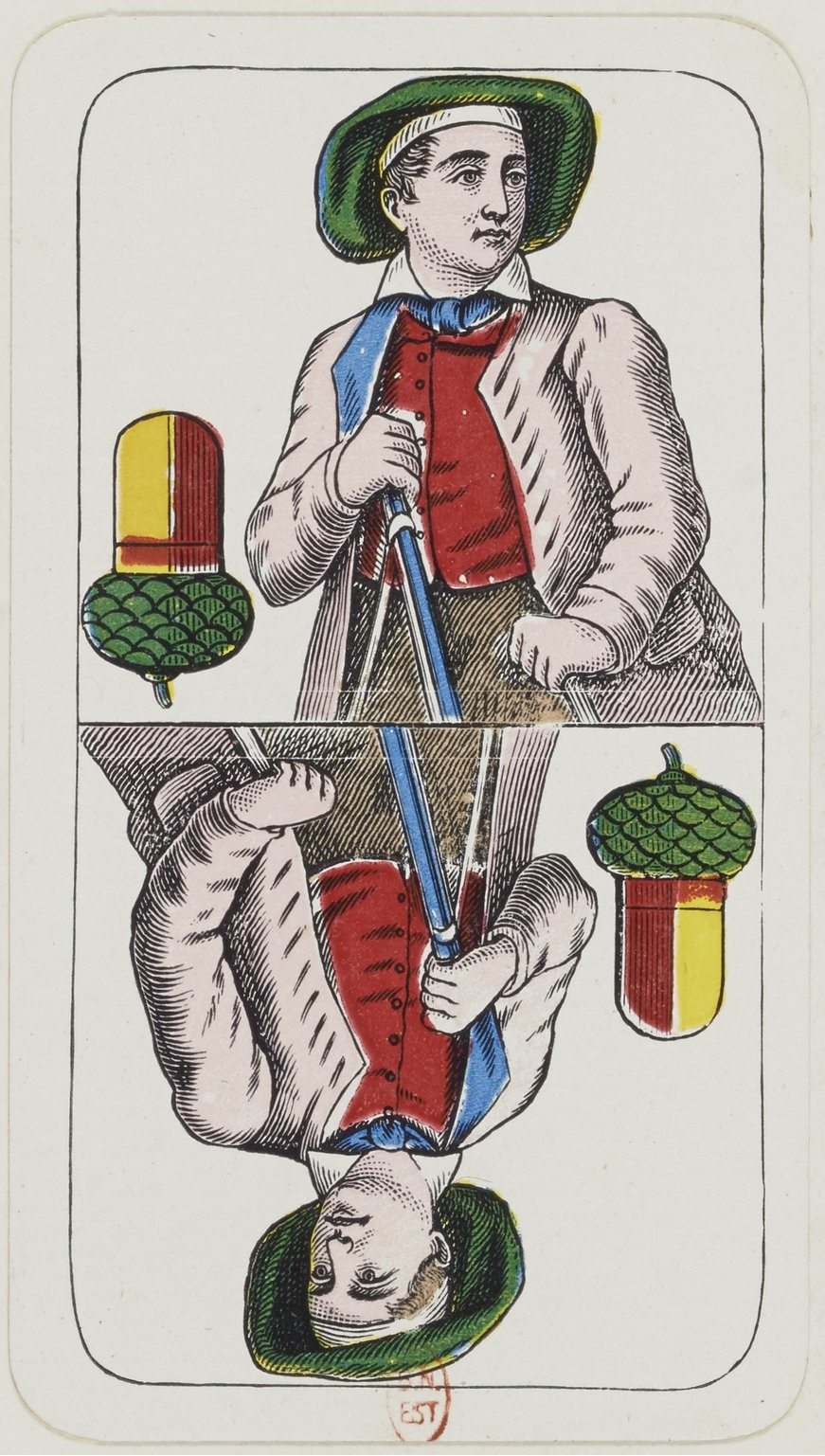
Unter of Acorns

The Württemberg pattern was invented around 1865 by C.L. Wüst and bears many unique features. The kings were copied from French-suited patterns now found in the Netherlands and Portugal. The Obers were inspired by the Knights in Adler Cego decks used in nearby Baden. Unters are journeymen in broad-brimmed hats. Unlike other German-suited patterns, the cards were only ever produced in double-headed format. A younger type of the Württemberg pattern, manufactured by the Nuremberg Playing Card Company (NSV) and others using different court designs, also exists.

In the present, the cards are sold as a doubled pack of 48 cards (24 unique cards duplicated). The duplicated cards (7, 10, U, O, K, A of each suit) are used to play Doppelkopf, Pinochle, and Gaigel. They used to be produced in 36 card packs (with every card unique), like other southern patterns, to play Württembergischer Tarock. This was the original format, but by 1985 it was restricted to the Palatinate where it eventually died out. Pressman Toy has published a 48 card version, in which every card is unique, to play Karnöffel. It uses the younger type and is mislabelled as the Bavarian pattern.

=== Central European ===
Tell pattern (Central European)

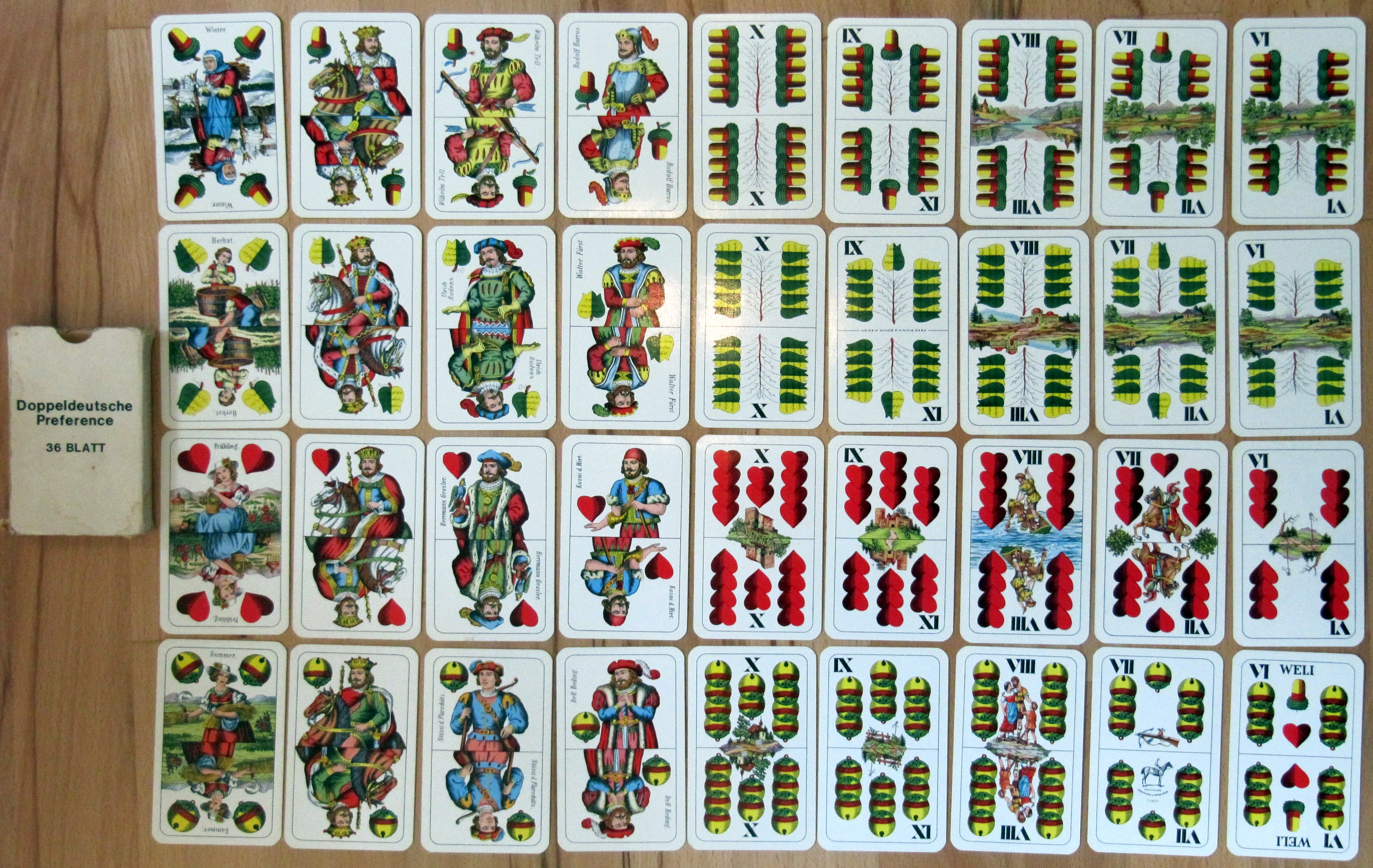
Full deck; note the "Weli" on the 6 of Bells.

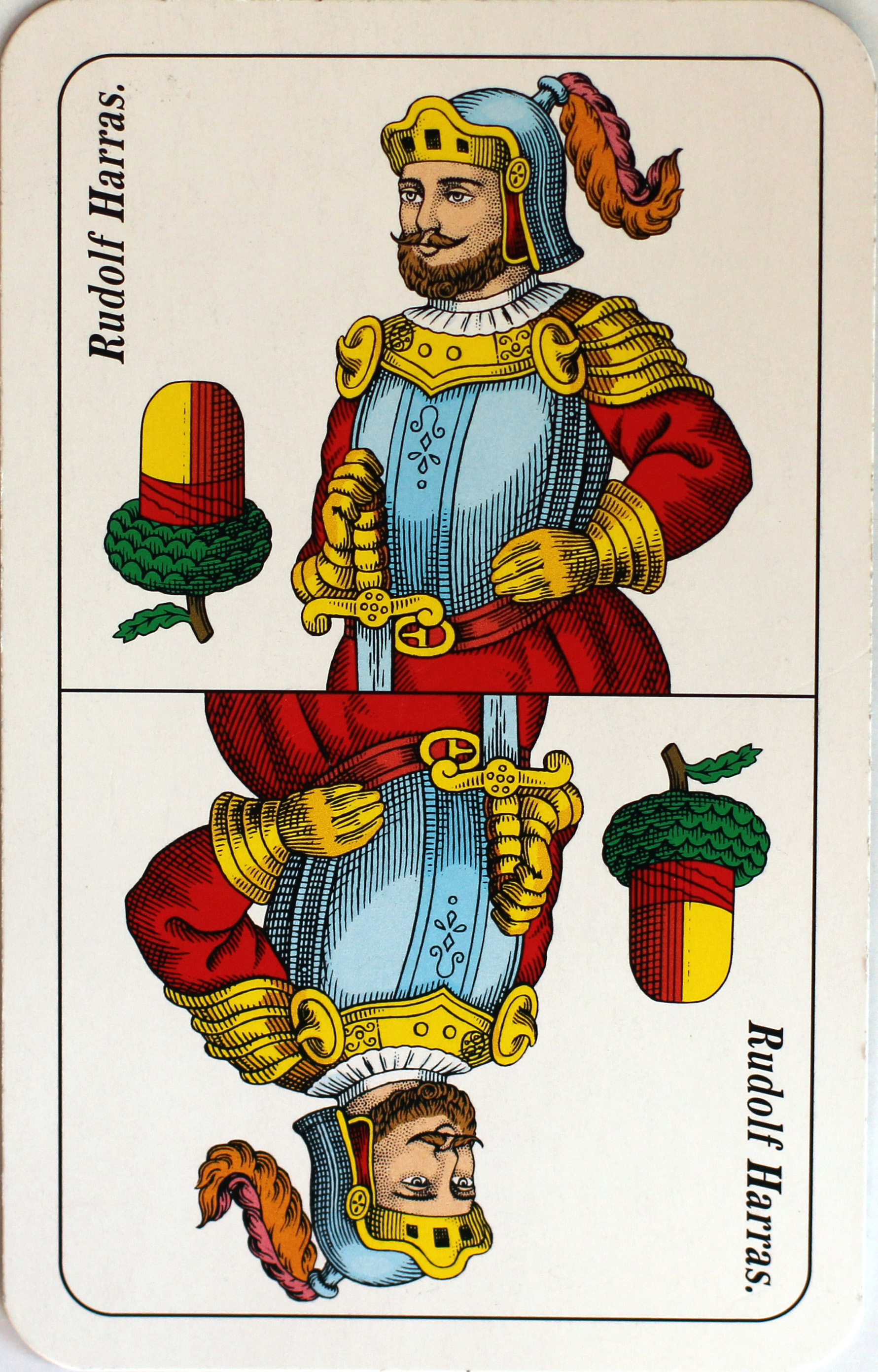
Unter of Acorns

The Tell pattern, Hungarian pattern, or in Austria called the Double German pattern, (Note: Known in Austria as doppeldeutsche which means "double German" and is a contraction for "double-headed German-suited".) is popular throughout the former Austro-Hungarian Empire which takes in much of Central and Southeastern Europe. The Ober and Unter cards depict William Tell and other characters from Friedrich Schiller's Wilhelm Tell (the title character is Ober of Acorns). The play was written in 1804, its first Hungarian performance was in 1827 at Kolozsvár (Austrian: Klausenburg) (Note: Nowadays Cluj-Napoca, but in 1804 it was transferring from Hungarian to Austrian sovereignty.) and the first decks were made by József Schneider of Pest around 1835. Schneider cut out sheets of 36 cards, applied the red, scarlet, blue, and brown colours to them using a template. He then painted the face, hands, and small ornaments of clothes by hand.

The characters from the drama were chosen to avoid censorship at the time of the Hungarian opposition to Habsburg rule. The story, after all, was about a successful revolt against the Habsburgs.

After the Hungarian War of Independence in 1848–49, the Austrian government confiscated the cards. Piatnik of Austria began producing this deck in 1865, they changed two of the characters. The Aces or Deuces depict the four seasons which are also somewhat different in the Austrian and Hungarian versions. The Slovak-Moravian version follows the Austrian version but does not label the characters or the seasons. The Kings represent no one in particular and are shown mounted on horses. Except for the Aces, all pip cards have Roman numerals. The suit symbols are also slightly different, most notably the leaves are now half yellow and end with three tips. They come in packs of 32, 33 (with the Weli), or 36 cards. They are sometimes called "Swiss cards" due to the nationality of the characters but this pattern is not used in Switzerland. In Hungary and other eastern European countries they are called "Hungarian cards" and only come in 32-card packs.

Here are the differences between the current iterations of the Hungarian (first given) and Austrian versions:

Suit Rank	Hearts	Bells	Leaves	Acorns
Unter	Kuoni the shepherd; Werner Stauffacher	Itel Reding	Walter Fürst	Rudolf Harras
Ober	Hermann Gessler	Stüssi the Ranger; Arnold von Melchtal	Ulrich of Rudenz	William Tell
Deuce	Spring: young woman pick- ing flowers (different poses)	Summer: young man resting on a haystack; young woman hay- making with a sickle	Autumn: boy drinking grape juice next to a vat; two boys treading grapes	Winter: old man warming himself with fire; old woman carry- ing firewood

=== Franco-German hybrid decks ===
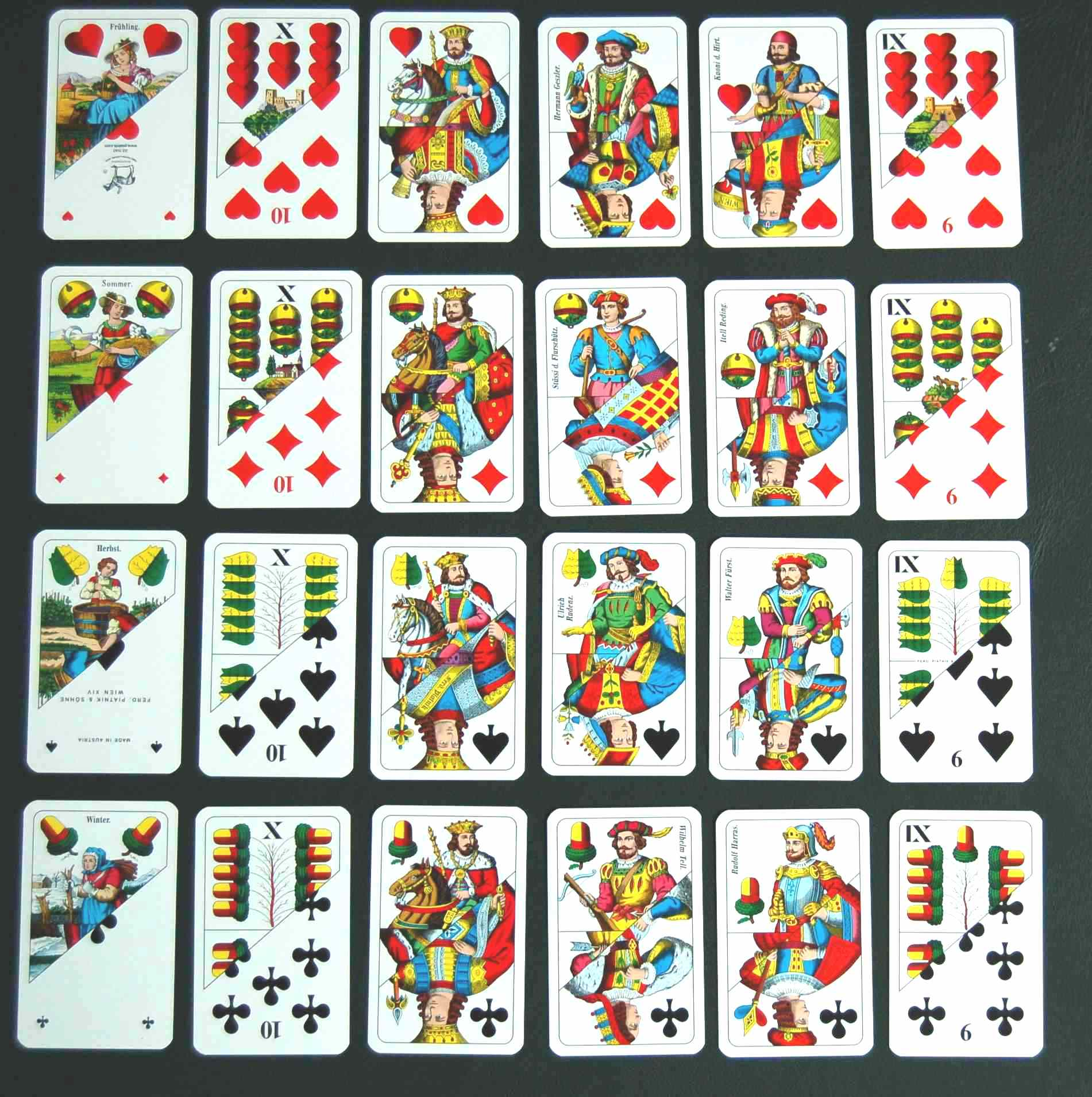
An Austrian hybrid deck with the Tell pattern on top and the Vienna pattern on the bottom

After the unification and reunification of Germany, compromise decks were created to help players from around the country who were used to different suits. The Skat Congress decks split cards diagonally with one half using the pattern with French suits and the other half using the pattern with German suits. This is not unique to Germany as similar split decks are found in Austria, Switzerland and even France. (Note: This is because the French regions of Alsace and Lorraine (currently Grand-Est) were once German territory)

The Turnierbild pack was created for official Skat tournaments, using the French suited Berlin pattern but with German colours (green Spades and yellow Diamonds). The packs from Grimaud also used this scheme.

== Literature ==
- Benő, Zsoldos (1980). A játékkártya és története [The Playing Card and its History]. Budapest: Gondolat.
- Braun, Franz (1966). Spielen und Kartenspiele [Games and Card Games]. Hanover: Schmidt-Küster.
- Dummett, Michael (1980). The Game of Tarot. London: Duckworth. ISBN 0-7156-1014-7.
- Hausler, Manfred (2010). Trommler und Pfeifer: Die Geschichte der Bayerischen Spielkarten. Munich: Volk. ISBN 978-3-937200-89-7
- Kranich, Jurgen; Radau, Sigmar; Schlede, Stefan (2009). Schwerdterkarten Band vol 1. Berlin: Studien zur Spielkarte.
- Suma, Wolfgang (August 1979). "Sachsenkarte – Schwerterkarte". The Playing-Card. Vol. 8, no. 1. pp. 1–19. ISSN 0305-2133.
- Suma, Wolfgang (August 1986). "The Oldest Pack of Leipzig Playing-Cards". The Playing-Card. Vol. 15, no. 1. pp. 19–24. ISSN 0305-2133.
