= Franciszek Bunsch =

Polish painter (1926–2025)

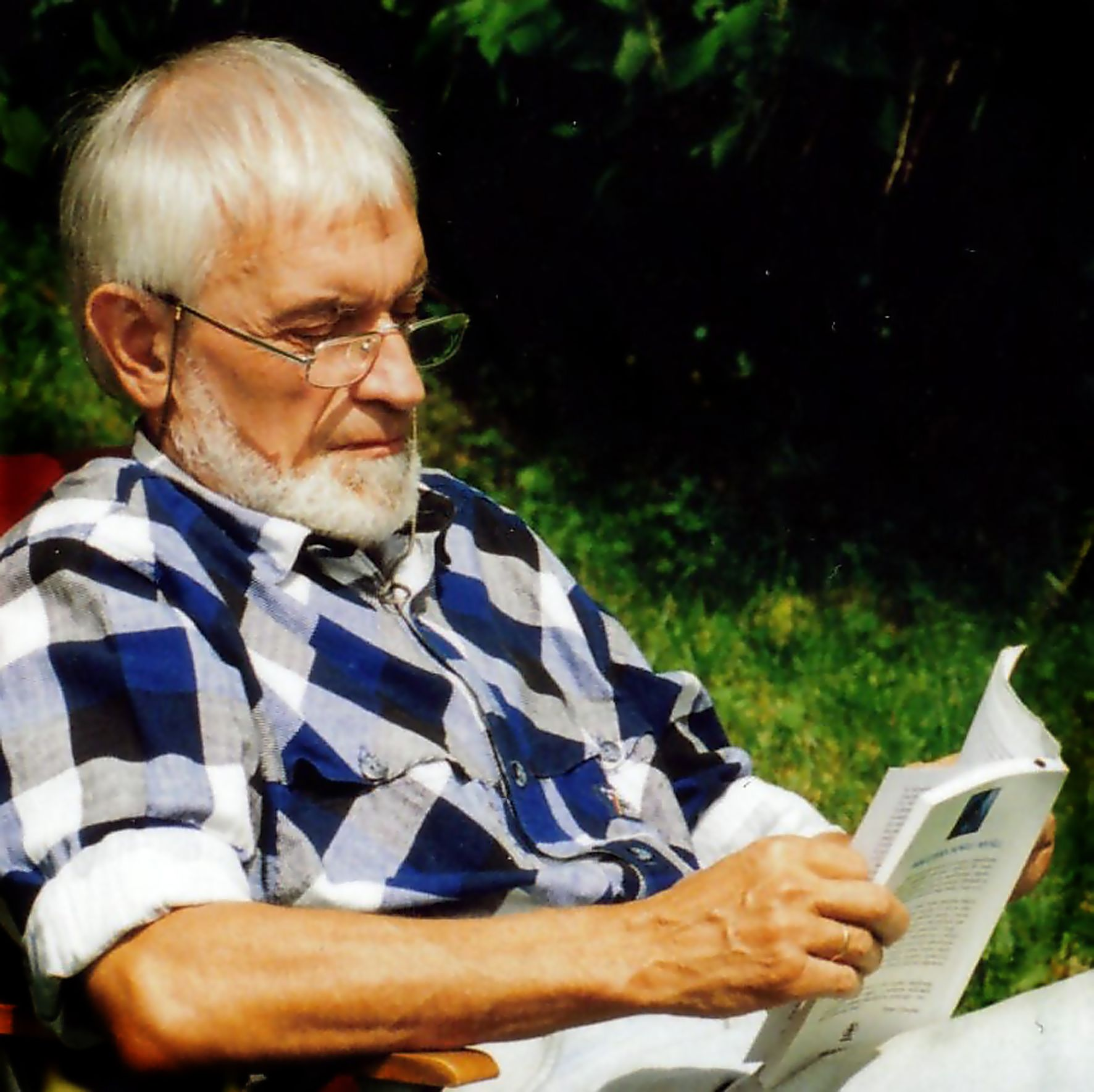
- Born: 9 August 1926; Bielsko, Poland
- Died: 23 March 2025 (aged 98)
- Known for: Painting, graphics
- Awards: Polish Cross of Merit Knight's Cross of the Order of Polonia Restituta Officer's Cross of the Order of Polonia Restituta Polish Honoris Gratia decoration

Franciszek Bunsch (9 August 1926 – 23 March 2025) was a Polish painter and graphic artist, representative of the Kraków school of workshop graphics, specializing in the metaphorical vision of reality. A longtime lecturer and professor at the Academy of Fine Arts in Kraków. Son of painter, Adam Bunsch and younger brother of the set designer Ali Bunsch.

Bunsch also illustrated books and did graphic design for publications, preparing such items as: series of woodcuts for J. de la Madelène's "Pan na Piaskowy Zamku" (which won 2nd prize at the 2nd National Exhibition of Books and Illustrations, Warsaw 1955) and "Ballads and romances" Mickiewicza (awarded a distinction at the National Competition for illustrations to the works of Adam Mickiewicz, Warsaw 1956), Tadeusz Kudliński, "The mask and the face of the theatre" (1963, with his wife, a painter Krystyna Bunsch-Gruchalska), as well as illustrating the ancient trilogy Olimpias, Parmenion, Aleksander with Karol Bunsch.

In the years 1960–1980 he designed a series of playing cards, printed on a large scale by Krakowskie Zakłady Wyrobów Papierowych (currently the Trefl Playing Card Company), which then became part of the canon of Polish card designs. Bunsch died on 23 March 2025, at the age of 98.

== Bibliography ==
- 175 lat nauczania malarstwa, rzeźby i grafiki w krakowskiej Akademii Sztuk Pięknych, wyd. Oficyna Artystów „Sztuka”, Kraków 1994, pp. 130, 147, 150, 155–157, 308, 351, 368, 397. Na książce ISBN 83-901350-0-0.
- Kunstgewerbeschule 1939-1943 i Podziemny Teatr Niezależny Tadeusza Kantora w latach 1942-1944, wyd. Cricoteca, Kraków 2007, pp. 5–16, 65, 83. ISBN 978-83-61213-00-0
- A. Toborowicz, Grafika ASP Kraków, wyd. ASP, Kraków 2013, s. 44–45. ISBN 978-83-64448-19-5
- 83 lata pracowni liternictwa i typografii w ASP w Krakowie, wyd. ASP, Kraków 2012, pp. 11, 15. ISBN 9788362321261
- F. Bunsch, A. Pasicki, Z. Jeżo, Pracownia Drzeworytu ASP w Krakowie: notatki z przeszłości, wyd. ASP, Kraków 1988.
- J. Madeyski, Malarstwo Franciszka Bunscha, [w:] Franciszek Bunsch. Grafiki - tempery, TPSP, Kraków 2001, pp. 11–14. ISBN 83-88121-40-5
- Wielość w jedności - Drzeworyt polski po 1900 roku. Materiały z sesji naukowej, red. naukowa: B. Chojnacka, M. F. Woźniak, wyd. Muzeum Okręgowe im. L. Wyczółkowskiego w Bydgoszczy, Bydgoszcz 2009, pp. 12, 5–19, 146, 155, 157. ISBN 8386580690
- Cyfert, S. "Krótka historia polskich kart do gry".
- VII Międzynarodowy Przegląd Ekslibrisu Drzeworytniczego i Linorytniczego im. P. Stellera (katalog), Katowice 2010, pp. 10, 14–15. ISBN 978-83-60209-66-0
- Książki autorskie Franciszka Bunscha, (AN), „Dziennik Polski", 22 January 2008.
- P. Taranczewski, F. Bunsch, Życie na niby, malowanie na serio, „Wiadomości ASP” no. 50, 06.2010, pp. 10–22.
- J. Bończa-Szabłowski, Finezja mistrza miedziorytu, „Rzeczpospolita", 29 April 2014.
- W. Krupiński, Profesor Franciszek Bunsch: Znaleźć własną postawę i siłę, „Dziennik Polski”, 19–20 September 2015. [dostęp 2018-04-22]
- M. Sołtysik, Franciszek Bunsch mistrz świadomego rytu, „Kraków” 2015, nr 9, pp. 72–73.
- Franciszek Bunsch - rysunek a grafika, Międzynarodowe Triennale Grafiki Kraków-2015. [dostęp 2015-10-08]
- Sygnowano: Bunsch - malarstwo, grafika, rzeźba, teatr, literatura, (katalog), Szczecin 2016.
- Bunsch-Gruchalska, Krystyna (2016). Od pomysłu do projektu - projektowanie kart do gry. Krystyna Bunsch-Gruchalska & Franciszek Bunsch. Szczecin: Książnica Pomorska im. Stanisława Staszica. ISBN 978-83-64070-06-8.
- J. Bończa-Szabłowski, Wielka planeta Bunsch, „Rzeczpospolita”, 22 April 2016. [dostęp 2018-04-22]
- P. Taranczewski, Wspominając Akademię: napisane, wysłuchane, zapisane, wyd. ASP, Kraków, 2017, s. 9, 362–379, 380–401. ISBN 978-83-65570-47-5
- Prezentacje. Franciszek Bunsch, „Pro Libris” nos. 1-2 (62-63), 2018. [dostęp 2018-04-22]
- Franciszek Bunsch: grafika, rysunek, malarstwo, red. F. Bunsch, J. Gościej-Lewińska, NCK, Kraków 2018. ISBN 978-83-950933-0-2
- S. Tabisz, W nastroju poezji… O twórczości malarskiej, rysunkowej i graficznej Franciszka Bunscha, „Wiadomości ASP” nr 85, 2019, pp. 80–83.
