= Trefl Playing Card Company =

Polish games manufacturer

- Industry: Playing card and board game manufacture
- Headquarters: Kraków, Poland
- Owner: Trefl

The Trefl Playing Card Company (Polish: Fabryka Kart Trefl-Kraków) is a Polish manufacturer of playing cards, board games and commissioned games, operating since 1947.

== History ==
The company was founded in 1926 as the Krakowska Fabryka Kart (Cracow Playing Card Factory). It closed during the war, but re-emerged in 1947 as the state-run Krakowskie Zakłady Wyrobów Papierowych (Cracow Factory for Paper Articles) or KZWP. It was privatised in 1997 and renamed the Krakowskie Zaklady Wyrobów Papierowych Trefl - Kraków Sp. z.o.o (Trefl Paper Factory). In 2014, it was rebranded as the Fabryka Kart Trefl-Kraków (Trefl Card Factory). Initially, the headquarters and factory were located in Kraków (also Cracow). In 2014, a new factory and office complex was opened in Podłęże, near Niepołomice, with an area of 6,650 m2. Currently, the company is preparing to build another ecological factory building with warehouse space and office and administrative facilities, which is to be taken into service in 2020.

== Activities ==
The company has worked closely with the Jan Matejko Academy of Fine Arts. Its card designers included: Franciszek Bunsch, Krystyna Bunsch-Gruchalska, Anna Gaber, Maria Orłowska-Gabryś and Professors of the Academy of Fine Arts, Jan Szaucenbach and Andrzej Mleczko.

The company is the oldest Polish publisher and producer of adult and children's playing cards and board games. The company also operates the Fabryka Kart brand, which provides printing services for publishers, private authors, cultural and educational institutions and advertising companies. The company prints and delivers finished products to dozens of countries in Europe. Certificates held include: ISO, SMETA, HACCP, and the ecological FSC certificate. The company is a member of the Polish Association of the Children's Toys and Articles Industry and it meets European standard EN-71 for the production of games and toys. Fabryka Kart Trefl-Kraków is also a publisher of games for children from the Zu & Berry and Muduko series.

In 1998, Trefl S.A., based in Sopot, became the major shareholder of the playing card company.

== Awards ==
- Diamonds Forbes 2019
- Małopolska Economic Award 2018, nomination for the 2018 National Economic Award
- Gazele Biznesu 2018 (and in previous years)
