= The Ancient Trilogy =

Trilogy by Karol Bunsch about Alexander the Great

- Olimpias (1955); Parmenion (1963); Alexander (1968)
- Author: Karol Bunsch
- Original title: Trylogia antyczna
- Country: Poland
- Language: Polish

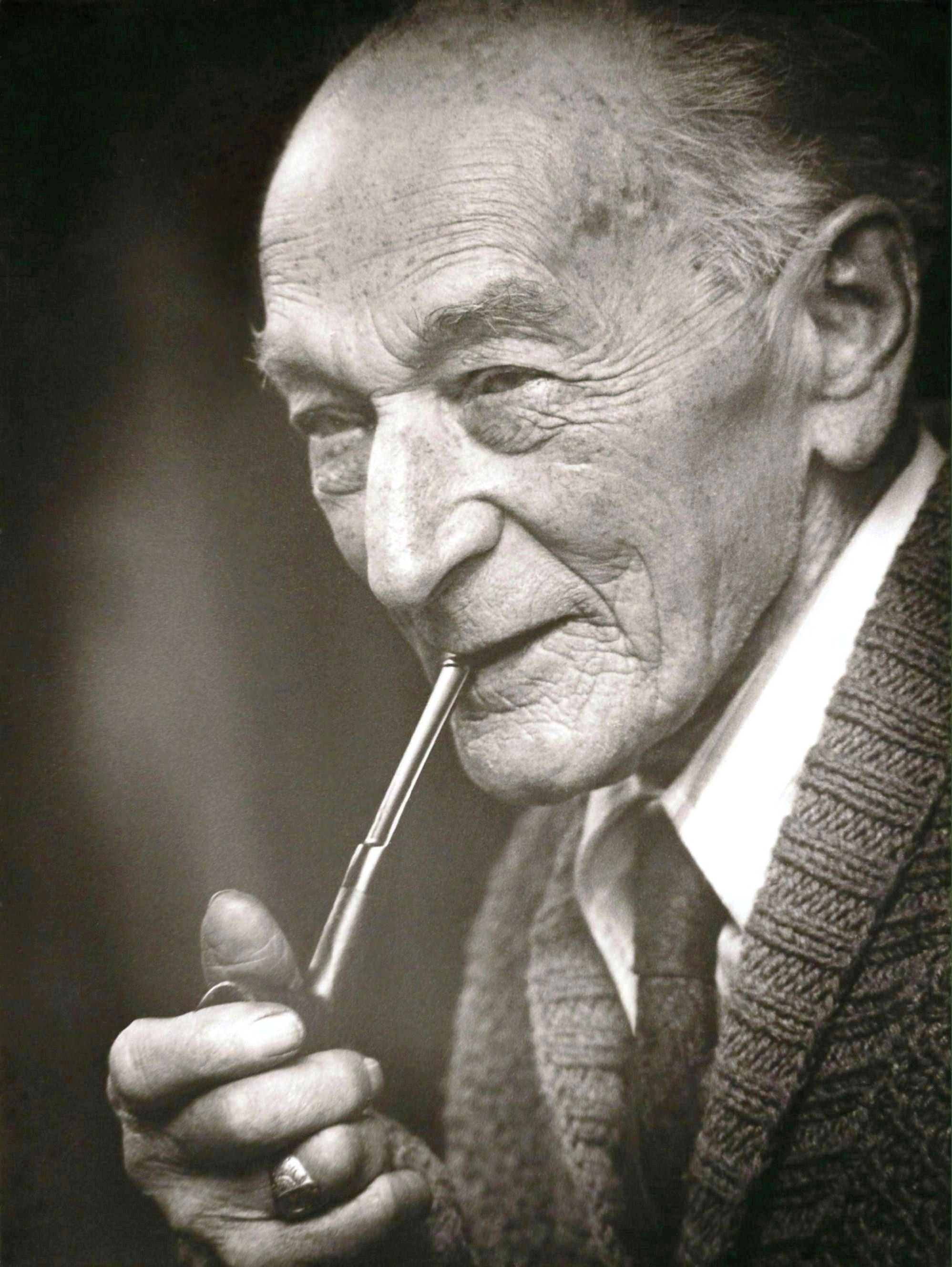
Karol Bunsch, the author of The Ancient Trilogy, in 1980

The Ancient Trilogy (Polish: Trylogia antyczna) is a Polish literary trilogy by Karol Bunsch about Alexander the Great, consisting of the novels Olimpias (1955), Parmenion (1963), and Alexander (1968).

The trilogy does not have a universally accepted title and is referred to in various ways, such as "the novel cycle about Alexander of Macedon", "the ancient trilogy", "Bunsch's ancient trilogy", or simply "Bunsch's trilogy". The author himself referred to it as the "trilogy about Alexander of Macedon" in an interview.

== Plot ==
The trilogy presents the life of Alexander the Great, although much of the narrative focuses on other significant characters from his time and circle, such as his mother, Olympias, and political and military figures like Demosthenes, Phocion, Hypereides, and Demades.

The story begins on the night of the burning of the Temple of Artemis, when Olympias, wife of King Philip II of Macedon, gives birth to Alexander. The central character of the trilogy is Alexander himself, with the first part focusing on his early years. Bunsch portrays Alexander as an exceptionally talented young man, excelling both in combat and in strategic thinking, with natural leadership abilities and a fierce determination. Bunsch also emphasizes the conflict between Alexander's parents, Philip II and Olympias, and its influence on the young prince. The first volume, which covers the years from 356 to 336 BCE, ends with the assassination of Philip II.

The second part is set during the years from 334 to 330 BCE, during Alexander's first campaign in Asia.

The third volume depicts the final years of Alexander's reign, including events such as the defeat of Bessus, the Indian campaign, and Alexander's death in 323 BCE, followed by the collapse of his empire. The trilogy concludes with the stoning of Olympias.

== Reception ==
Stanisław Stabryła dedicated a multi-page article to the trilogy in the 1971 issue of Twórczość. He praised its educational (informative) value, noting that the author was highly knowledgeable in history of this area and that he created a historically believable story. From an artistic standpoint, he regarded the first part of the trilogy as the best, writing that "in the later parts, the historical material seemed to overwhelm the writer with its magnitude, forcing a partial retreat from fully utilizing the literary potential." Stabryła made similar remarks regarding on the second volume, noting that its focus shifted to historical content, which caused the reduction it its adventurous and romantic themes. In his analysis of the final volume, he remarked that the subsequent "reduction of literary elements doesn't make this book particularly attractive or easy." Stabryła described Bunsch's prose as repetitive, while simultaneously praising the language for its clarity, accuracy, and succinct presentation. He criticized the trilogy for its somewhat vague psychological portrayal of the main character but commended the vivid depiction of secondary characters and Alexander's futile empire-building efforts (since Alexander's vast empire disintegrated shortly after his death).

Aleksander Krawczuk also praised the trilogy for its accurate portrayal of historical events. He highlighted that, except for minor characters, all the key figures in the trilogy were historical, and that the main narrative remains largely faithful to historical sources, though the work is not a popular science book but rather a historical novel. Krawczuk noted that Bunsch, "true to his literary inclinations and ambitions, freely develops, embellishes, and enriches threads that are sometimes barely mentioned in historical sources." Artistically, Krawczuk had mixed feelings, acknowledging "the artistic merit of the work as a whole and the vividness and drama of many scenes," while also noting that "certain parts drag on and are simply too lengthy." He pointed out that the fact the trilogy had already gone through four editions was a testament to its popularity.

== Analysis ==
Stanisław Stabryła believes that the trilogy "primarily serves as a foundation for the writer's reflections on power, politics, and war," encapsulated by the maxim sic transit gloria mundi ("thus passes the glory of the world"). Stabryła also noted that although Alexander, regarded as the main character of the trilogy, is often sidelined in the first two parts, where many events are presented from the perspective of other characters. According to Stabryła, Bunsch attributes Alexander's success to his luck. Stabryła identifies as the "fundamental weakness" of the trilogy its insufficient psychological portrayal of Alexander, who despite being its central character is a "static figure, without spiritual evolution." He adds that Bunsch excels more in depicting numerous secondary characters, concluding that the somewhat "blurred internal image of Alexander" may actually align with historical reality.

Aleksander Krawczuk observed that readers might expect the trilogy to be about war, but in reality, it is a trilogy about the rise and fall of an empire, where the focus is often not on battle scenes but rather on "political maneuvering, intrigue, passions, and ambitions." He praised the author for not modernizing the characters' motivations unnecessarily, "avoiding a pretentious chase for originality." Krawczuk also noted that the trilogy is a platform where "the author attempts, albeit indirectly and subtly, to convey his reflections on the meaning of history, the role of individuals in historical events, and the impact of power on personality," describing these reflections as pessimistic – "there are no flawless heroes... and even the grandeur of the most significant events is constantly tainted by human pettiness and stupidity." This is also reflected in the portrayal of Alexander himself, who, while possessing many positive qualities, is "simultaneously a victim of his own flaws and vices." Krawczuk highlighted how the novel shows the inevitable corruption that stems from power and success.
