= Trefl =

Polish toy manufacturing company

Trefl S.A.
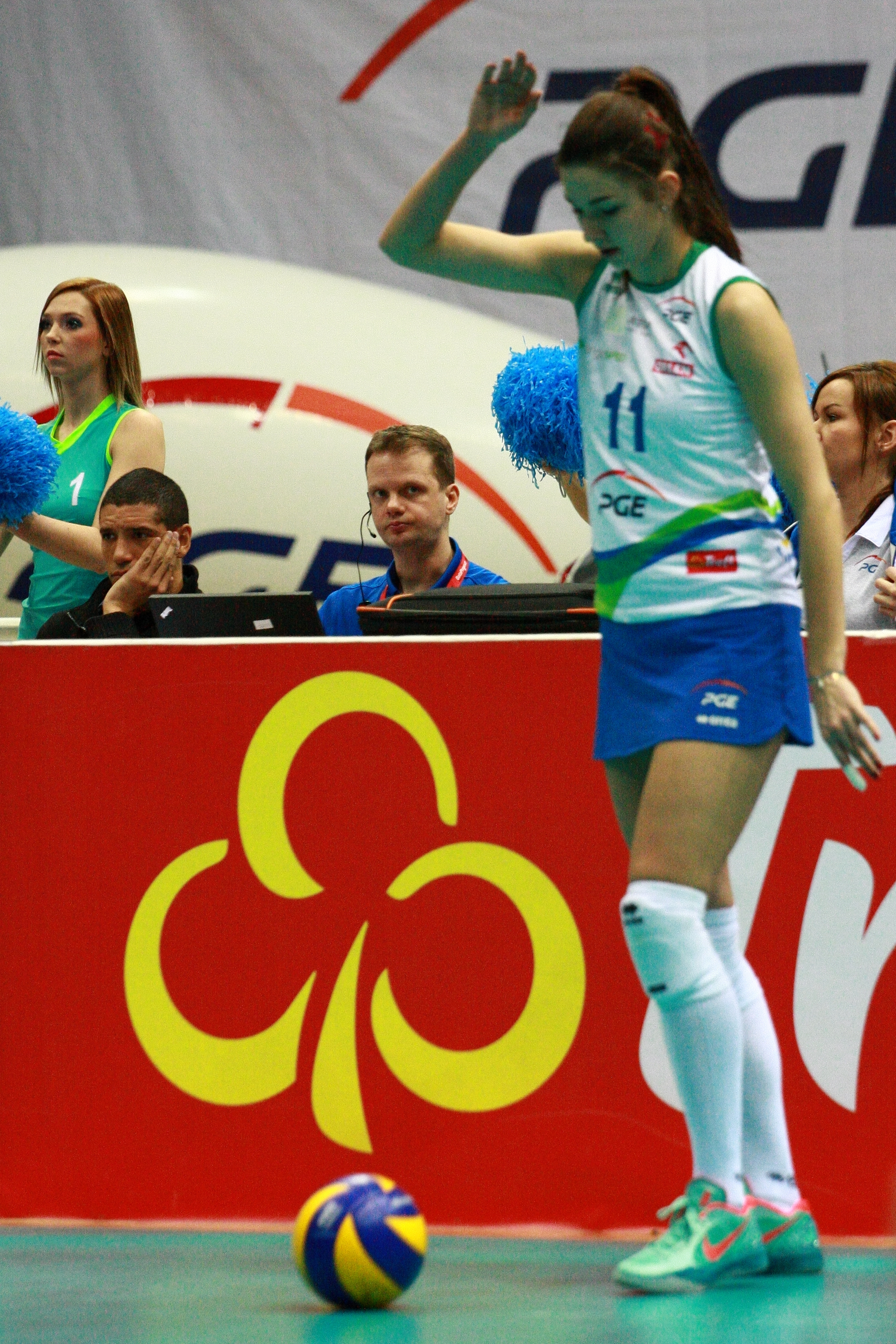

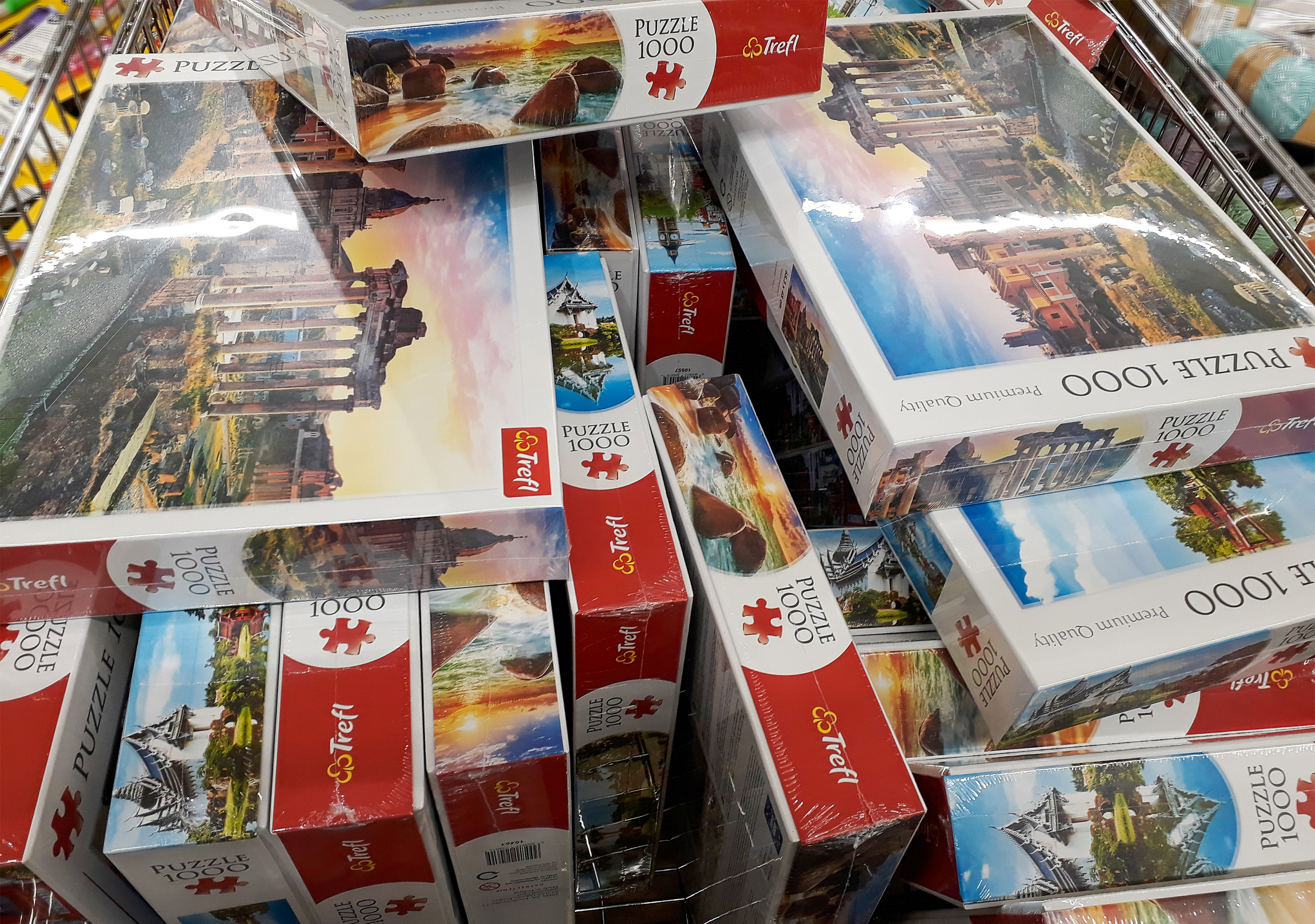
- Several Trefl puzzles of 1000 pieces
- Type: Spółka Akcyjna
- Industry: Toys and entertainment
- Founded: 1985
- Headquarters: Gdynia, Poland
- Area served: Worldwide
- Key people: Kazimierz Wierzbicki (founder); Jakub Siemiątkowski (President of the Management Board)
- Products: Toys; Games; Jigsaw puzzles; Publishing services
- Subsidiaries: Trefl Playing Card Company
- Website: www.trefl.com/en/

Trefl S.A. is a Sopot, Poland-based family-owned jigsaw puzzle, board game and toy manufacturing and distributing company, Poland's largest and one of the leading European jigsaw puzzle companies. The Trefl group also includes Studio Trefl, which produces animated television series, Wydawnictwo Trefl, which publishes children's books, and Baltic Media Group, a media company which produces commercial and advertisement videos.

The sporting division of Trefl includes Trefl Sopot and Trefl Gdańsk, professional men's, respectively, basketball and volleyball teams. Trefl widely licences popular brands such as Disney characters, Hasbro and Mattel, to feature them on their products.

== History ==
Trefl was founded in 1985 by Kazimierz Wierzbicki, who began manufacturing jigsaw puzzles. In 1989, the company received a permit to export its products. Since 1991, Disney is Trefl's major licensing partner. The company started making 3D puzzles in 2004. In 1998, Trefl became the major shareholder of Kraków-based game cards manufacturing company, today known as Trefl Playing Card Company (Fabryka Kart Trefl-Kraków).

== Sponsorship ==
Kazimierz Wierzbicki is an avid sports fan and former basketball, skiing and volleyball instructor. Thus, his company has a long-standing tradition of supporting local sports. In 1995, he founded one of Poland's leading and most-successful professional men's basketball teams, Trefl Sopot.
