= Łukasz Gołębiowski =

Polish ethnographer, historian, translator and librarian (1773–1849)

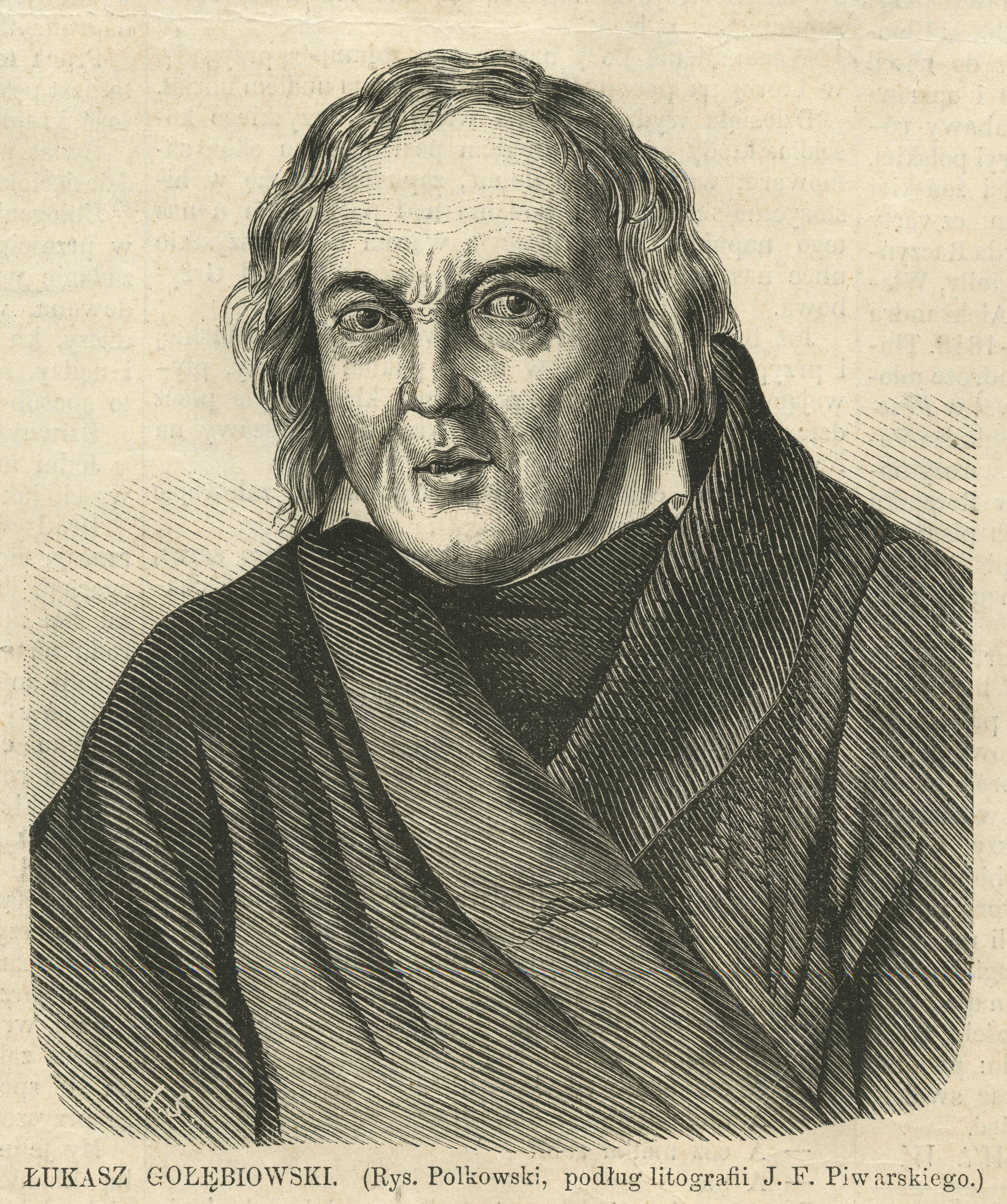
- Born: 13 October 1773; Pohost, Galicia, Habsburg Empire (now Pahost Zaharodski, Belarus)
- Died: 7 January 1849 (aged 75); Kazimierówka, Kingdom of Poland, Russian Empire (now Poland)
- Occupations: Ethnographer, historian, translator, librarian

Łukasz Gołębiowski (Polish pronunciation: [ˈwukaʐ ɡɔwɛmˈbjɔfskʲi]; 1773–1849) was a Polish ethnographer, historian, translator and librarian. In 1794, he fought as a Polish army officer in the Kościuszko Uprising against Russia and participated in the Battle of Szczekociny.
