= Scherwenzel =

German card game

- An historical south German gambling game
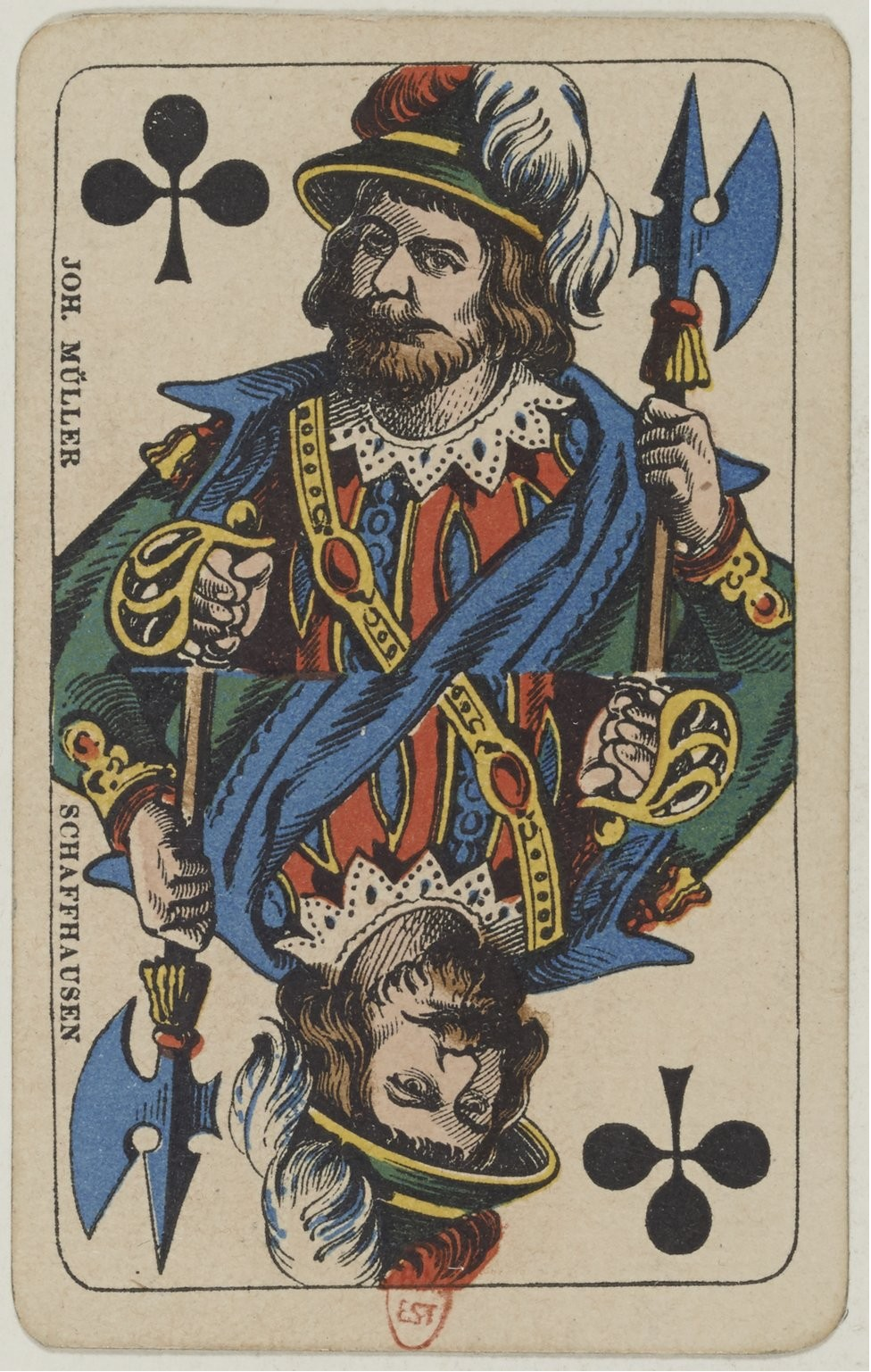
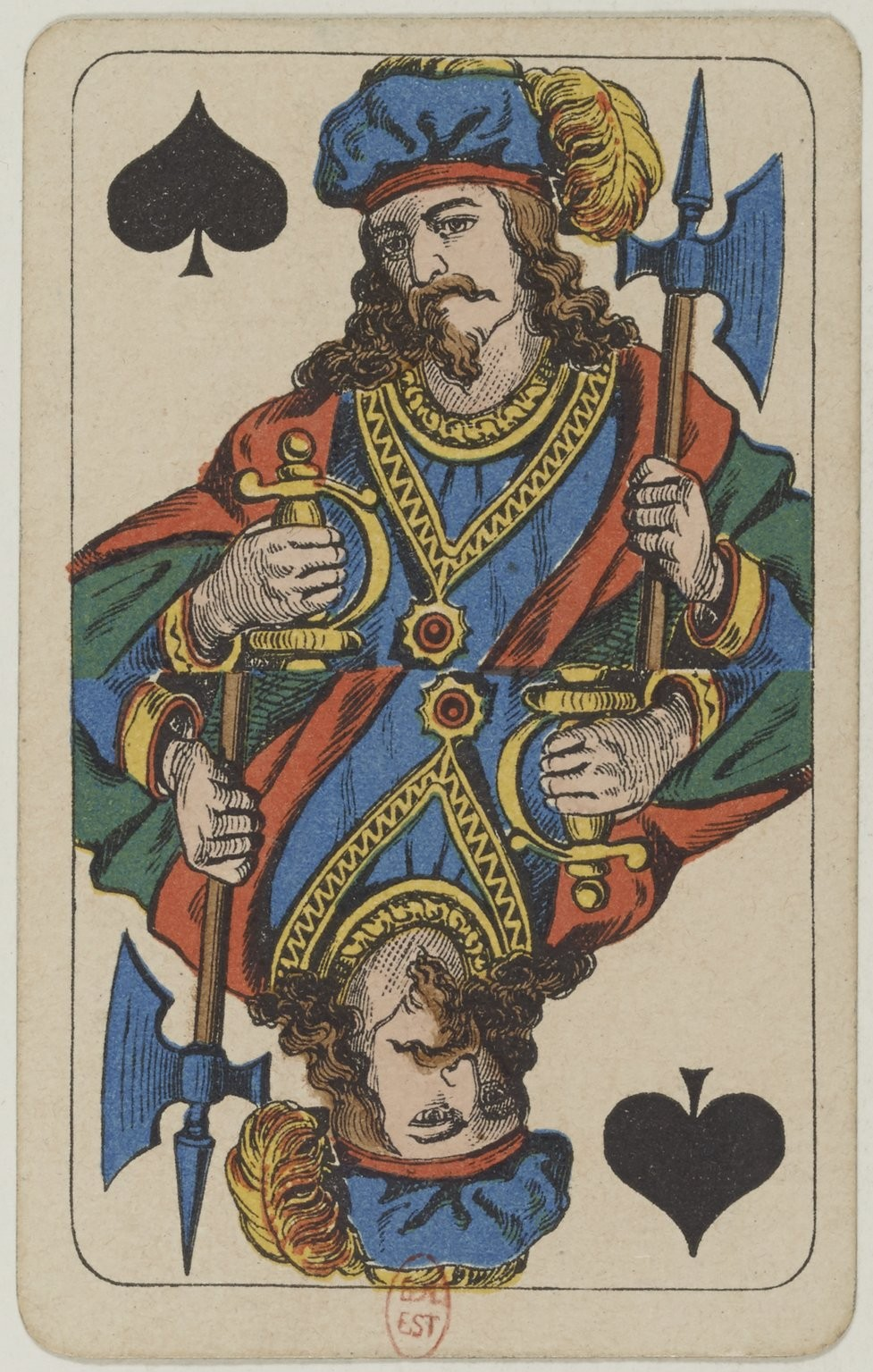
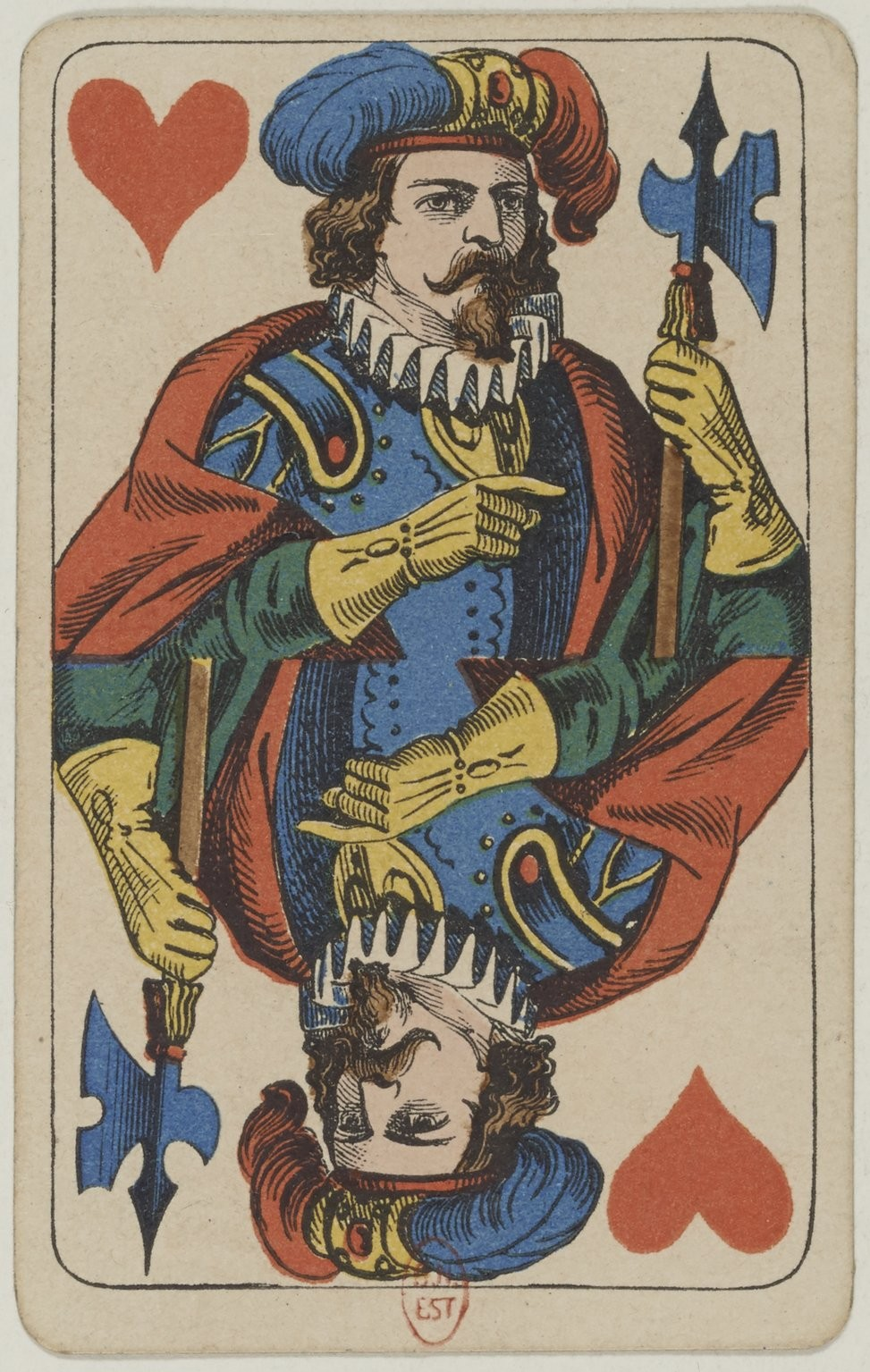
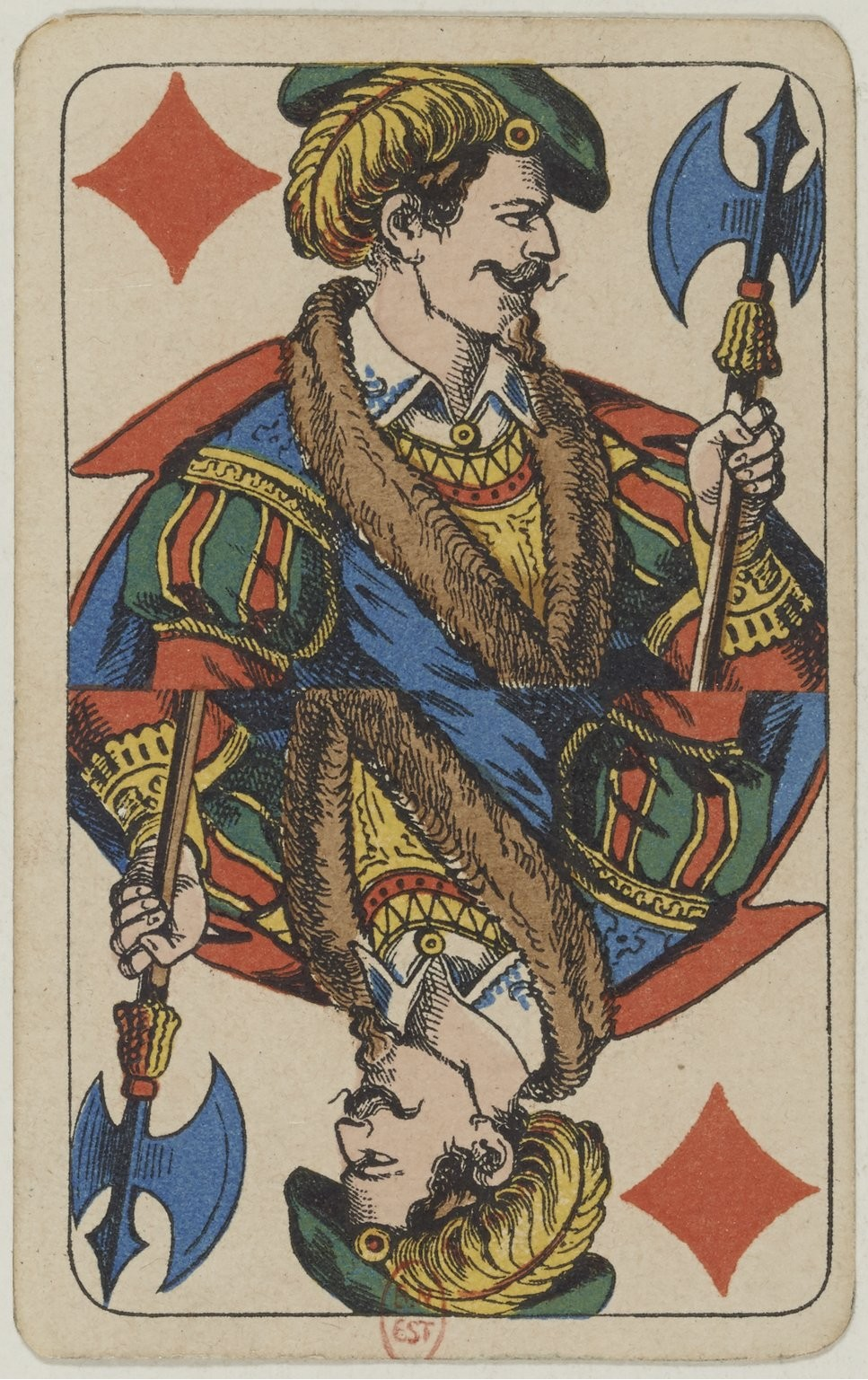
- The four Scherwenzels
- Origin: South Germany
- Alternative names: Scharwenzel
- Type: Gambling game
- Players: 4
- Deck: French or German-suited cards

Scherwenzel or Scharwenzel is a 16th-century, German, gambling game played with cards and named after the Unters or Jacks that had special privileges. It appears to have been an elaboration of Grobhäusern or Färbeln played in Germany, Poland, Silesia and Bohemia, but especially in Bavaria in which the Unters were variously known as Scharwenzels, Scherwenzels, Scherers or Wenzels. They, and to some extent also the Nines, functioned as wildcards. According to Adelung, Grobhäusern, on which it was based, was "far simpler than Scherwenzeln".

This game should not be confused with the north German partnership game of Scharwenzel, in which the Jacks have no special role, but the top trumps, as in Hombre and Solo are the black Queens and trump 7.

== Origin of the name ==
The word Wenzel was a short form in German of the male first name Wenzeslaus which is Wenceslas or Wenceslaus in English. For reasons that are not entirely clear a Scherwenzel was originally a pejorative name for an obsequious servant or lackey.

== History ==
A game called Scherlenzen is mentioned as early as the 1563 in a list of games played by disreputable "drunkards" and "players" who "never read the Bible from one day to the next." Around 1600 a poem was published entitled Teutsch- und Frantzösisch Scharwentzel Spiel ("The French and German Game of Scharwentzel") that describes the game as one of bluffing and cheating in which Wenzels and Sevens are important cards and a flush (Fluß) plays a key role. During the 17th and 18th centuries, there are further references to the game, for example, in a 1711 French-German dictionary, it is recorded that a tricon is a triplet in the game of Scherwenzel.

Scherwenzel is recorded as early as 1563 as scherlentzen in a list of card games by Marstaller.

As the name of a card, probably an Unter, the German-suited equivalent of a Jack, Scherwenzel is mentioned in a 1700 play by Christian Weise, thus implying it was in common usage by then. Another early record which may hint at the eponymous game occurs in a 1722 natural history book by Johann Friedrich Henkel where he likens 3 Principiis to "the two Scherwenzels (pity there aren't three) which can be turned into any suit in the pack". Another reference to the Scherwenzels as wildcards, able to be converted into any card in the pack, occurs in a 1726 book on medicine.

Grobhäusern and Trischak are described as "similar", but nevertheless "different" from Scherwenzel by Adelung in 1780. In the late 18th century, Grobhäusern was played in rural Upper Saxony, while Scherwenzel was played in rural areas of Germany, Poland, Silesia and Bohemia.

The game of Scherwenzel was popular enough in the early 18th century that it was used, at least in Bavaria, pars pro toto to refer to any game at cards.

A 1744 German rendering of Alexander Pope's Rape of the Lock translates the game of Lu as Scherwenzel. Scherwenzel also features in a list of games in a 1755 poem.

== Rules ==
According to Adelung (1798), Scherwenzel was a variant of Grobhäusern in which the Jacks function as wildcards, called Wenzels or Scherwen(t)zels. This is borne out by Hempel (1827 & 1833) who describes Grobhäusern in detail and then gives a short description of the differences for Scherwenzel. The following is a summary of Hempel's rules.

=== Deal and vying ===
Scherwenzel is a German card game for two to eight players played anticlockwise. Each receives 2 cards and may keep or discard them. The first player to keep cards places a basic stake; this is called betting (ausbieten). Forehand is usually required to bet. Subsequent players may either fold or may hold i.e. keep their cards (mithalten) and ante the same stake. Beginning with the dealer or, if the latter has folded, the next active player, players must now fold or raise the bet. If no one raises, the cards are shuffled together with the discards and each remaining player gets 2 more cards. Beginning with forehand or, if the latter has folded, the next player, bets again and subsequent players again bet or fold in turn. Starting with the last player to stay, players now raise or fold. If none raises, each player shows their cards and the highest combination wins the pool.

=== Winning ===
The game is won by the person who has the highest quartet, namely 4 Deuces, 4 Kings, etc. has. After a quartet comes a flush of the most points in the same suit (Fluß); The highest flush is 41, with the Deuce 11, King, Ober, Unter 10 and the remaining cards scoring their face value. If there is no quartet or flush, a set of 3 Deuces or 3 Kings, etc. wins. After the latter, 2 cards of the same suit. Two Kings, 2 Obers, etc. do not count.

The key difference between Grobhäusern and Scherwenzel is that, in the latter, the four Unters and four 9s, known as Wenzels, are wild. Thus three Wenzels may be combined with a Deuce to form four Deuces etc. The highest combination of all is four Wenzels.

If points are equal, the earlier player bidding order wins. In some areas 4 consecutive cards, each of a different suit is a Krikelkrakel and counts as a quartet. For example, the 7 of Leaves, 8 of Hearts, 9 of Bells and 10 of Acorn. They rank in reverse order, so the lowest Krikelkrakel, i.e. the one starting from a 7, beats one starting from an 8, 9, etc.

=== Variation ===
There is some indication that Scherwenzel, and possibly also Grobhäusern, could also be played with 5 cards.

== Literature ==
- Adelung, Johann Christoph (1798). Grammatisch-kritisches Wörterbuch der Hochdeutschen Mundart, Volume 3. 2nd expanded and improved edn. Leipzig: Breitkopf & Härtel.
- Adelung, Johann Christoph (1801). Grammatisch-kritisches Wörterbuch der Hochdeutschen Mundart, Volume 4. 2nd expanded and improved edn. Leipzig: Breitkopf & Härtel.
- Apin, Siegmund Jacob (1727). Grammaticalisches Lexikon. Nuremberg: Endter & Engelbrecht.
- Gottschedinn, Luise Adelgunde Victorie (1744). Herrn Alexander Popens Lockenraub. Leipzig: Breitkopf.
- Grimm, Jacob and Wilhelm Grimm (1893). Deutsches Wörterbuch. Vol. 8 (R–Schiefe). Leipzig: S. Hirzel.
- Hallbauer, Friedrich Andreas (1725). Anweisung Zur Verbesserten Teutschen Oratorie. Jena: Hartung.
- Hempel, F. F. (1827). "Grobhäusern" in Encyclopädisches Wörterbuch der Wissenschaften, Künste und Gewerbe, Vol. 8 (G–Hältiges Gestein) ed. by Heinrich August Pierer and August Daniel von Binzer. Altenburg: Literatur-Comptoir. pp. 593–594.
- Hempel, J.F.L. (1833) "Scherwenzel" in Encyclopädisches Wörterbuch der Wissenschaften, Künste und Gewerbe, Vol. 8 (S–Schlüprig) ed. by Heinrich August Pierer. Altenburg: Literatur-Comptoir. p. 494.
- Henkel, Johann Friedrich (1722). Flora Saturnizans. Leipzig: Martini.
- Marstaller, Christoph (1563). Der Welt Vrlaub von den Menschen Kindern.
- Rondeau, Pierre (1711). Nouveau Dictionnaire François-Allemand et Allemand-François, Vol. 1. Leipzig: Fritschen.
- Schiffner, Albert (1829). Allgemeines deutsches Sach-Wörterbuch. Meissen: Friedrich Wilhelm Goedsche.
- Schmeller, Johann Andreas (1836). Bayerisches Wörterbuch. Part 3 (R and S). Stuttgart and Tübingen: J.G. Cotta.
- Stahl, Georg Ernst (1726). D. George Ernst Stahls, Königl. Preuss. Leib-Medici und Hof-Raths Untersuchung Der übel curirten und verderbten Kranckheiten sind.... Leipzig: Caspar Jacob Eyssel.
- [S.W.] (c. 1600). Teutsch- und Frantzösisch Scharwentzel Spiel.
- Trömer, Jean Chretien (1755). Jean Chretien Toucement des Deutsch Franços Schrifften. Vol. 2. expanded. Nuremberg: Raspe.
- Weise, Christian (1700). Neue Proben von der vertrauten Redens-Kunst. Dresden & Leipzig: Miethen, Zimmermannen.
