= Trischaken =

Historical Austrian, German and Polish gambling card game

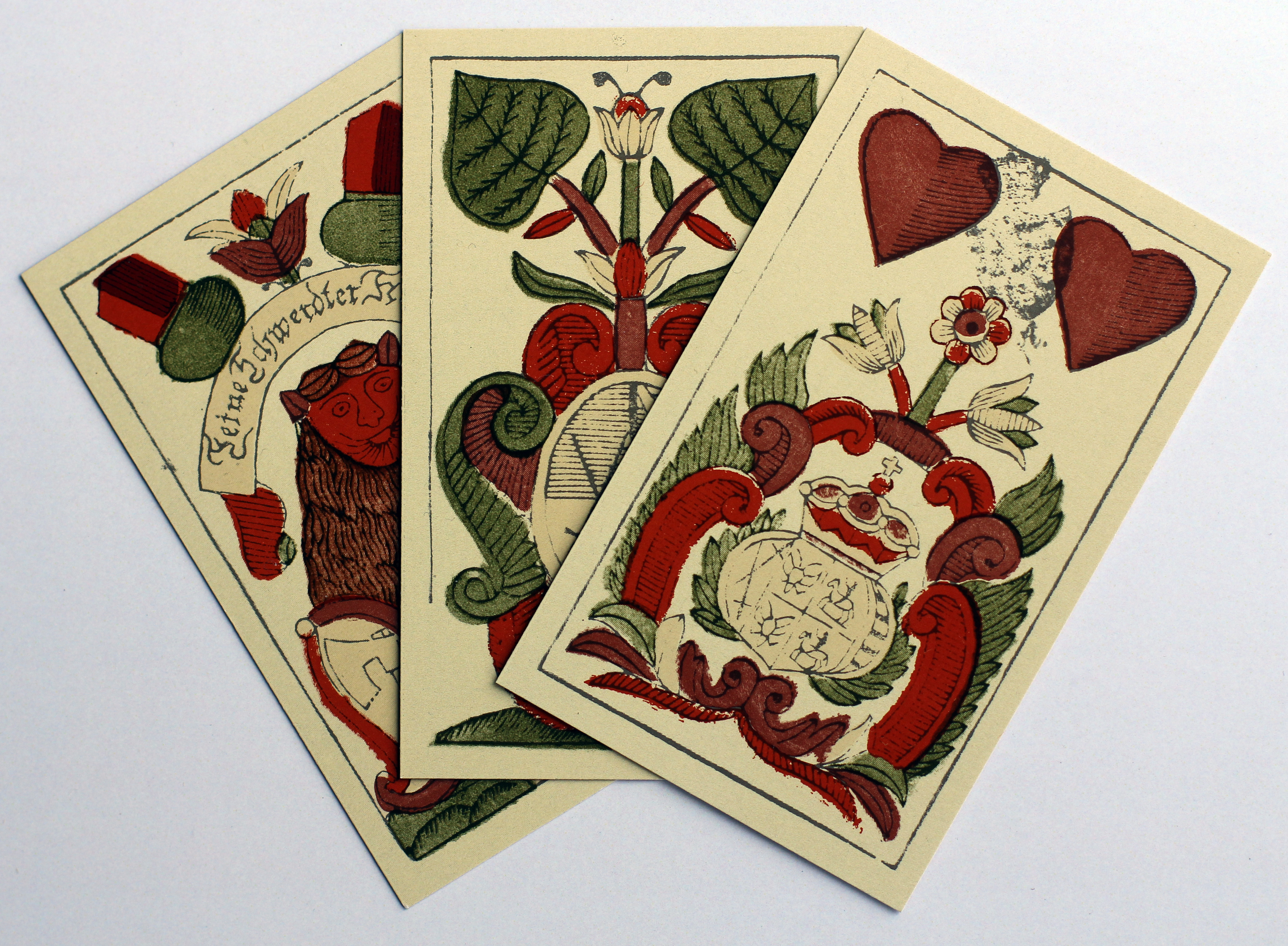
A high hand in Trischaken - three Aces (1832 Schwerterkarte pack)

Trischaken is an historical Austrian, German and Polish gambling card game for three to five players. It appears related to French Brelan and German Scherwenzel.

== History ==
The game dates back to the 16th century when it was played at court in the Kingdom of Poland. It is also mentioned as a card game in a 1706 German poem and listed as a banned gambling game in a 1734 law book of Anhalt-Bernburg. An indication of its distribution is given by its inclusion in a 1771 Bremen-Lower Saxon dictionary and its description as "popular" in Bavaria from at least the late 18th to mid-19th century. The word was also spelt dreschaken, meaning "to beat, thrash, cudgel", and may have been derived from dreschen, to thresh, recalling the game of Karnöffel whose name also means "to thrash". In 1871 it was described as a game of chance, popular with peasants "in the provinces" and played with the "large old German cards", which presumably meant 36- or even 48-card, German-suited packs.

Treschaken was equated with French Brelan and the game of Krimp, Krimpen or Krimpenspiel.

== Description ==
=== German Drischaken or Trischaken ===
The Brothers Grimm give a brief description of Drischaken as a game for three to five players in which each receives 3 cards and the winner is the one who has the most cards of various possible combinations. They give various alternative spellings as drischäken, drischeken, dreschakn, trischaken and trischakeln. and adds that, "likewise karnöfeln means playing as well as thrashing", referring to another widespread card game of the time.

A detailed description in German of the rules of Brelan (a.k.a. Trischaken) is given in Pierer's Universal Lexikon, Volume 3 in 1868.

=== Austrian Trischack ===
According to Popowitsch (1705–1774), the Austrian game of Trischack (Trischackspiel) was played with 3 cards and the Jack (Bub) or Nine – known as Pamfili – of each suit are wild. In Saxony and Silesia, they were called Wenzels or Scharwenzels. Thus it may have been related to the Bavarian game of Scherwenzel. However, Hommel equates Trischak to Grobhäusern which was essentially Scherwenzel without any wild cards.

In Austria, the Schärwenzel (i.e. the 7, 8 and 9 or the 7, 8 and Jack) was the highest card. In Franconia and Saxony, Trischaken was played with 4 cards per player using German-suited cards.

=== Polish Tryszak ===
Tryszak (German: Treschak), also called Straszak and Fluss because a flush was an important feature, was an old gambling game that was popular at the beginning of the reign of Stanisław August Poniatowski (reigned 1764–1795), but had been attested much earlier since there is a story that when King Sigismund I (reigned 1506–1548) was playing the game with two ministers, he was dealt two Kings but did not have a third one in his hand. So he claimed that he counted as the third king and thus ensured he won. A detailed description of the game is given by Chomentowski and reproduced by Łukasz Gołębiowski (1831).

The game was played thus: a silver plate was placed on the table and each player laid his money in front of him and anted a stake to the plate. A pack of 36 German-suited cards was shuffled and the dealer dealt two cards each. Obers and Nines were better than the others and could be used as wild cards to make up a triplet or quartet. After the deal, if a player had poor cards and couldn't form a pair, they were discarded. A player with a Nine, an Ober or a pair, passed, waiting for someone to say "play", then replied "I'll keep it". Those left in would play; out of 6 to 9 players, often only 2 or 3 would play. A bold player or one with good cards could raise the stake before the next two cards were dealt. A player decided how many cards he wanted to exchange, raising the stake each time. The aim was to scare the opponent into folding and, with a poor card or a good one, force the stakes up. However, if no-one wanted to take a risk, the rate was suddenly reduced and returned to the basic stake.

The cards ranked in the typical order for Polish cards. Four-card combinations ranked above 3-card combinations; a straight flush outranked a flush which, in turn, beat a set (triplet or quartet). Obers and 9s were wild; one wild card could be used to make up a 3-card combination and up to two could be used to make up a 4-card combination. Natural combinations outranked wild combinations of the same type; likewise three Kings outranked three Obers etc.

Tryszak may be ancestral to Chlust which has been known since the early 19th century.

== Other uses ==
Schmidt suggests an actual link with Karnöffel as well as a game called Treschack, played with 3 Kings (It.: tre sciacchi), neither of which resemble Brelan.

In modern times, Trischaken is the name of a null contract in the popular European Tarot card game of Königrufen.

== Literature ==
- _ (1855). Sitzungsberichte by the Vienna Academy of Sciences (Akademie der Wissenschaften in Wien Philosophisch-Historische Klasse). Vienna: Imperial and Royal Printers.
- Beermann, Siegmund (1706). Einige historische Nachrichten und Anmerckungen von der Graffschafft Pyrmont. Frankfurt and Leipzig: Hauenstein.
- Cella, Johann Jakob (1786). Johann Jakob Cella's, J. V. D. und Hochfürstl. Anspach. Justizrath und Kastner zu Ferrieden freymüthige Aufsätze. Vol. 3. Anspach [Ansbach]: Benedict Friedrich Haueisen.
- Chomentowski (1867). Wielkie poselstwo do Turek.
- Frisch, Johann Leonhard (1755). Nouveau Dictionnaire des Passagers François-Allemand et Allemand-François. Leipzig: Johann Friedrich Gleditsch.
- Gloger, Zygmunt (1903). Encyklopedia Staropolska, Vol. 4.
- Gołębiowski, Łukasz (1831). Gry i Zabawy Róz̊nych Stanów, w Kraju Cakym, lub Niektórych Tylko Prowincyach. Warsaw: Glücksberga.
- Grimm Jacob and Wilhelm Grimm (1860). Deutsches Wörterbuch, 6th edn., vol. 2.
- Hommel, Card Ferd. (1769). Rhapsodia Quaestionum, Volume 1. 3rd edn.
- Kaiser, Friedrich (1871). Ein Pfaffenleben (Abraham a Sancta Clara): historischer Volksroman. Vol. 1. Vienna: Waldheim.
- Linde, M. Samuel Bogumił (1812). Słownik Języka Polskiego, Vol. 5 (R – T). Warsaw.
- Pierer, H.A. (1868). Universal-Lexikon der Gegenwart und Vergangenheit oder neuestes encyclopädisches Wörterbuch der Wissenschaften, Künste und Gewerbe, 3rd volume, 5th fully improved edn. Altenberg (Bodmerci-Chimpanzee). Altenburg: Pierer.
- Schmidt, Karl Christian Ludwig Schmidt (1800). Westerwäldisches Idiotikon, oder Sammlung der auf dem Westerwalde. Hadermar and Herborn: Gelehrte Buchhandlung.
- Popowitsch, Johann Siegmund Valentin (18C) [2004]. Vocabula Austriaca et Stiriaca. Part 2. P. Lang.
- Weber, Karl Julius (1855). Deutschland, oder Briefe eines in Deutschland reisenden Deutscher, Vols. 1–2. p. 332.
