= Chlust =

Polish gambling card game

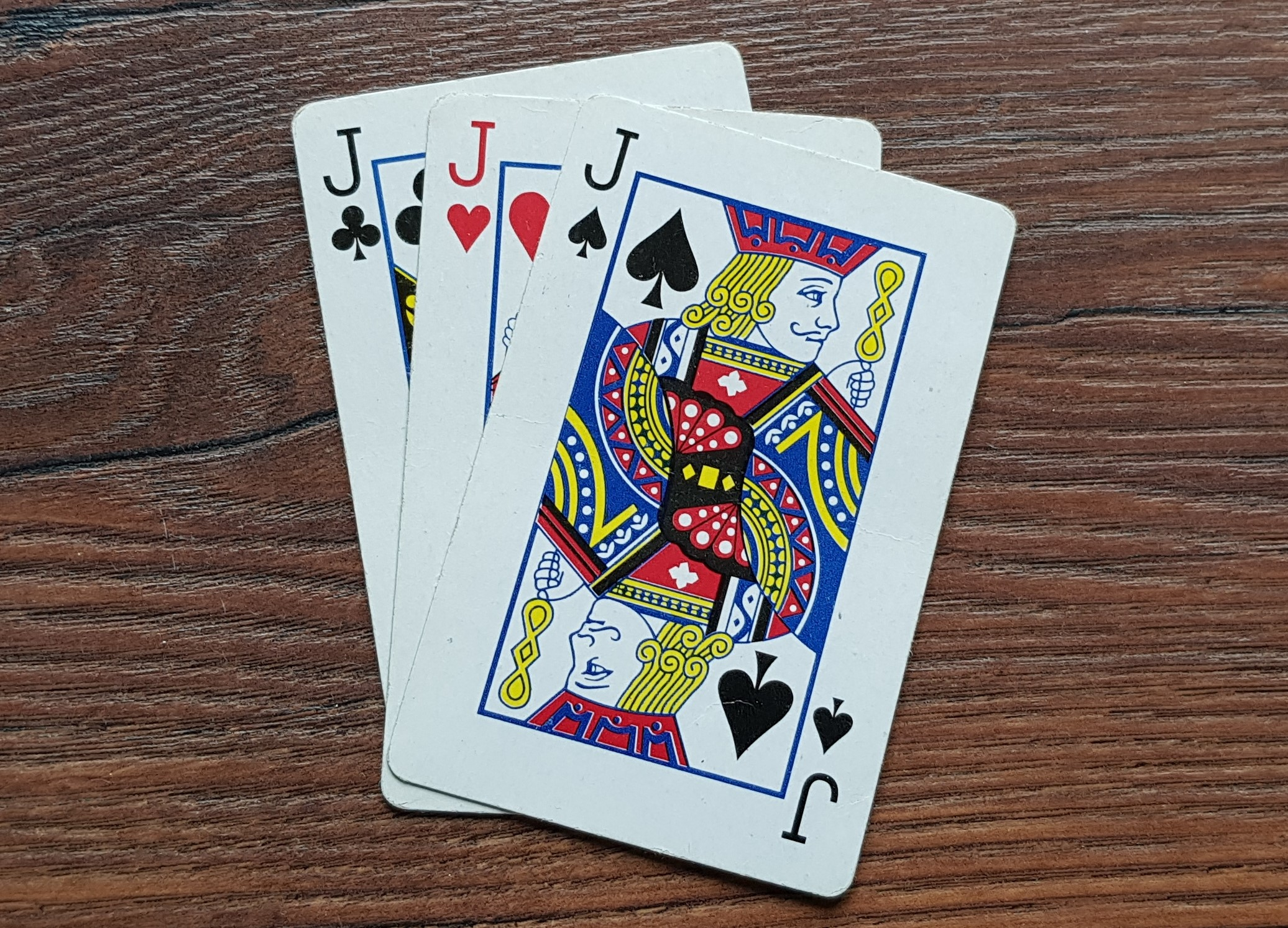
- Three jacks, the best hand in the game.
- Origin: Poland
- Type: Gambling / Trick-taking
- Players: 2-4
- Skills: Probability
- Cards: 20 or 24
- Deck: French
- Rank (high→low): A K Q J 10 (9)
- Play: Clockwise
- Playing time: 1 minute
- Chance: High

Related games
- Tryszak, Zwikken

Chlust ([xlust], Polish for 'splash') is a Polish gambling card game know primarily in Upper Silesia, hence its alternative name 'Silesian poker', although the game was in existence well before poker was invented. The name is derived from the splashy sound the cards make while being played onto one another, especially when aggressively.

== History ==
Chlust is over 200 years old, being mentioned as early as 1807 by Linde in his Polish-German dictionary as a "common card game". In the 20th century the game was noted by Wieczorkiewicz (1966) as a gambling game.

== Rules ==
=== Overview ===
Chlust is a game for at least two, at most four people. The game requires a pack of 20 French-suited cards, Aces down to Tens, but Nines may be added if desired.

=== Deal ===
The players ante equals stakes into a pot before being dealt three cards each, one at a time. Next, the dealer turns the top card, which indicates the trump suit. If that card is the ace, it can be exchanged for the lowest trump by anyone who has it. The pack must be properly shuffled and cut before the deal.

=== Bidding ===
A player can raise, call or fold. If everyone folds, a new hand is played. If everyone calls, the players compare their hands, with the best set winning.

=== Combinations ===
A combination comprises three cards of the same rank or suit. The descending order of sets is as follows:

1. Three jacks
2. Three of a suit
3. Three of a rank

The Ten of Clubs (♣10) is wild and may be played in place of any other card. If Clubs are trumps, then the Ten of Spades (♠10) fills this role.

If two players have the same kind of combination, the following rules apply:

1. The trump suit beats the other three
2. The suits are ranked: Clubs (♣), Spades (♠), Hearts (♥), Diamonds (◆)
3. The cards are ranked: Ace, King, Queen, Jack, Ten, Nine (A, K, Q, J, 10, 9)
4. The wild card played to a set of Tens or Clubs/Spades counts as a regular card
5. If two players have sets of the same suit, the one with the higher top card wins, unless that player has the wild card.

=== Trick taking ===
If no-one has a combination, the dealer leads to the first trick. Players must follow suit if they can, otherwise must trump if able. If neither following nor playing a trump is possible, any card is played. Players must always head the trick if they can. The highest trump wins the trick or the highest card of the led suit if no trumps are played. The trick winner leads to the next trick. The one with most tricks wins the hand.

== Bibliography ==
- Linde, Samuel Bogumił (1807). Slownik jezyka Polskiego: A. - F. Warsaw: Pilarow.
- Wieczorkiewicz, Bronisław (1966). Słownik Gwary Warszawskiej xix Wieku. Państwowe Wydawn. Naukowe.
