= Grobhäusern =

Historical German vying game

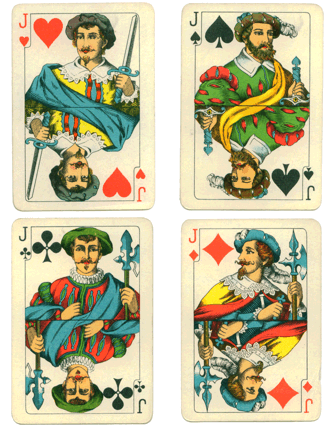
- Origin: Germany
- Type: Vying game
- Players: 2–8
- Cards: 32
- Deck: French or German-suited cards

Grobhäusern, also Grobhaus, is an historical German vying game in which players bet and then compare their 4-card combinations. It is played by two to eight players using a 32-card piquet pack. The game was illegal in most places. It was popular in rural Upper Saxony in the late 18th century. A variant played in Danubian Austria-Hungary was Färbeln.

== History ==
Grobhäusern is mentioned as early as 1749 as a "pleasant German game" alongside Rummel, Scherwentzeln and Contra. But it was often viewed as a gambling game and consequently banned as, for example, in 1771 in a Duchy of Anhalt ordinance. Grobhäusern and Trischak are described as "similar to", but nevertheless "different from" Scherwenzel by Adelung in 1780. As of the late 18th century, Grobhäusern was played in rural Upper Saxony, and Scherwenzel was played in rural areas of Germany, Poland, Silesia and Bohemia. The use of Jacks (and to a lesser extent 9s) as wildcards in Scherwenzel may be related to the elevation of Jacks (and to a lesser extent 9s) to trumps in various European card games. Adelung suggested that Scherwenzel is the origin of the designation wenzel for Jacks as highest trumps.

== Rules ==
For the first phase each player is dealt 2 cards. Eldest hand is obliged to bet the minimal wager, then all other players in turn may either call or fold. Calling means to increase one's bet to the maximum bet so far, and folding means leaving the game and forfeiting one's bet. The last player who calls has the right to raise the stakes, starting a new round of calling or folding, etc. The first phase is over once everybody has called and nobody raises any more. The cards of those players who folded are shuffled together with the remaining stock.

For the slightly different second phase, each player is dealt 2 more cards for a total hand of 4 cards. First eldest hand, then the dealer (if still in play), then the player sitting in turn before the dealer etc. may raise the stakes and thereby start a new round of calling or folding. The second phase is over once everybody has called and nobody raises any more.

Card-point values
Rank	A	K	Q	J	10	9	8	7
Value	11	10				9	8	7

Once betting is over, all players display their cards, and the player with the best hand wins the pot. In descending order the possible combinations are

Quartet (four of a kind)
All four cards of the same rank. When comparing two such hands, aces are high and tens low.
Four Card Flush
All four cards of the same suit. To compare two such hands, card-points are counted.
Prial (three of a kind)
Three cards of the same rank.
Three Card Flush
Three cards of the same suit. To decide ties, card-points are counted.
Pair
Two cards of the same suit. To decide ties, card-points are counted.

When there is a tie even after counting card-points, the player who sits earliest in the direction of play wins, starting with eldest hand.

In the event that nobody raises in the second phase, players do not show their cards. In this case all players who folded in the first round must raise their stakes retroactively and the pot is held in abeyance.

== Variations ==
There is a variation in which the following is added as the highest combination.

Krikelkrakel
Four cards of consecutive rank, each in a different suit.

The lowest Krikelkrakel consists of 7, 8, 9, 10, no two of them being of the same suit.

== Related games ==
=== Färbeln or Einunvierzig ===
Färbeln, Farbl'n or Einunvierzig is a more complex, Danubian (Austro-Hungarian), variant. Färbeln is recorded as early as 1756.

=== Scherwenzel ===
Scherwenzel or Scharwenzel was a form of Färbeln played in Bavaria in which the Unters were variously known as Scharwenzels, Scherwenzels, Scherers or Wenzels. They, and to some extent also the Nines, functioned as wildcards. According to Adelung, Grobhäusern was "far simpler than Scherwenzeln". In a 1711 French-German dictionary, it is recorded that a tricon is a triplet in the game of Scherwenzel. This variant should not be confused with the north German game of Scharwenzel, in which the Jacks have no special role, but the top trumps, like those in Hombre and Solo are the black Queens and the trump 7.

=== Gråpojs ===
Gråpojs (also spelled Grospojs or Grospois) is a Swedish version of the game. The Swedish name is a corruption of the German "Grobhäuser".

== Literature ==
- _ (1756). Die Kunst die Welt erlaubt mitzunehmen in den verschiedenen Arten der Spiele, Volume 2, Georg Bauer, Nuremberg.
- _ (2003). Tschaerwenkaer Heimat-Zeitung. Vol. 41. Munich: Heimatausschuss Tschaerwenka.
- Grimm, Jacob and Wilhelm Grimm (1893). Deutsches Wörterbuch. Vol. 8 (R–Schiefe). Leipzig: S. Hirzel.
- Langstedt, Friedrich Ludwig (1801). Uebungen zum Englisch-Schreiben für junge Leute beiderlei Geschlechts. Nuremberg: Rasper.
- Marstaller, Christoph (1563). Der Welt Urlaub von den Menschen Kindern.
- Rondeau, Pierre (1711). Nouveau Dictionnaire françois-allemand et allemand-françois. Vol. 1. Leipzig: Fritschen.
- Schmeller, Johann Andreas (1836). Bayerisches Wörterbuch. Part 3 (R and S). Stuttgart and Tübingen: J.G. Cotta.
