= Skærvindsel =

Danish card game

- Traditional Danish card game
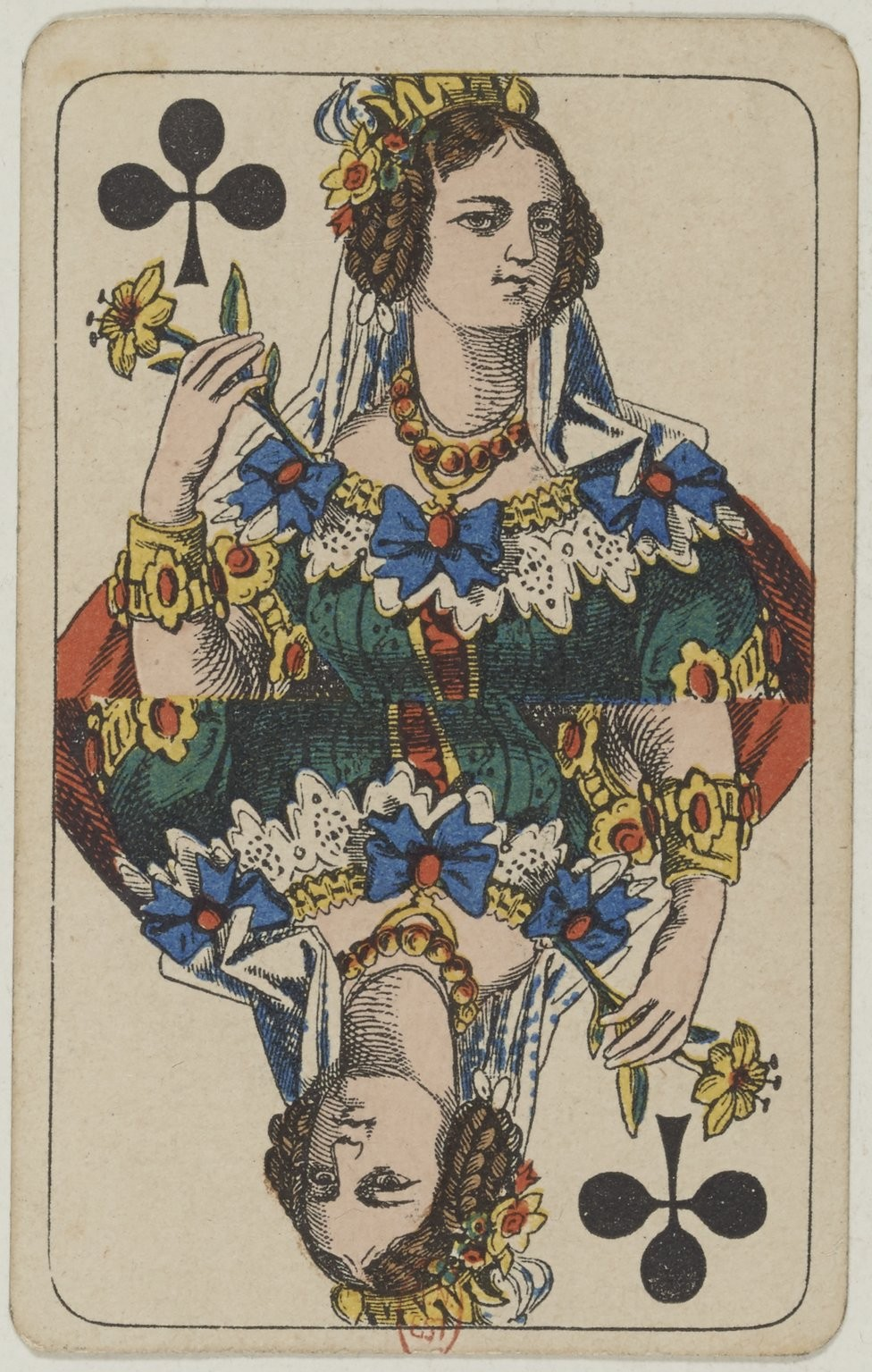
- The top trump in Skærvindsel
- Origin: Germany
- Alternative names: Sjevinsel, Scharwenzel, Scherwenzel
- Family: Plain-trick
- Players: 4
- Cards: 28, formerly 36
- Deck: French pack
- Play: Clockwise

Related games
- Schafkopf • Scharwenzel • Sjavs

Skærvindsel is a Danish card game for four players that is a member of the Schafkopf family. Today it is mostly played in Jutland and is therefore often spelled Sjervinsel, but was previously widespread throughout Denmark. It was the first Danish game where the winner of the auction, the declarer, could choose a partner by calling an Ace. This principle has since been transferred to Call-Ace Whist (Esmakkerwhist).

== History ==
Skærvindsel came to Denmark over 200 years ago and is probably a Danish version of the old Bohemian game of Scharwenzel which spread to Denmark during the Napoleonic Wars. Scherwenzel was certainly played in harbour town of Porsgrunn in southern Norway, in 1790 and is known in Denmark from around 1800.

Skærvindsel was the first ordinary card game in Denmark where one choose a partner by calling an Ace. It was popular in Denmark until around 1950.

The game is still regularly played, for example, at Nyvang near Holbæk.

== Names ==
The Danish Ordbog gives the following spelling variations for the game: Scherwenzel, Scharwenzel, Skavendsel, Skærvensel, Skervensel, Skærvindsel, Skærvinsel, Skevensel, Skevinsel, Sjervensel, Sjervinsel, Servensel, Sevensel, Servinsel, Sevinsel. The game is also known as Jutish Whist because it is similar to Whist and is still played in Jutland.

== Objective ==
To win the auction, choose the trump suit, and then take at least 4 tricks either alone or with a partner. The declarer decides the trump suit (except in a Malør) and calls an Ace he doesn't have to choose a partner. The partner must play the called Ace the first time its suit is played.

== Short Skærvindsel ==
Skærvindsel used to be played with 36 cards ranking from 6 to Ace, but today it is usually played with a shortened pack of only 28 cards – 7s + 9s to Aces – and sometimes with even fewer cards. In Danish packs, the Aces are marked with an "E" (Es), Queens with a "D" and Jacks with a "Kn" (Knave). There are 12 trumps in the red suits and 11 in the black suits. The trumps rank in descending order as follows: ♣Q, 7, ♠Q, ♣J, ♠J, ♥J and ♦J, A, K, (Q), 10, 9.

The 7 highest trumps (from the ♣Q down to and including ♦J) are called matadors if the declarer and, in a partnership game, the partner have an unbroken sequence (1-7) of these trumps from the top. For example, if the declarer and partner have between them the ♣Q, trump 7, ♠Q, ♠J and trump A, they have 3 matadors, while with the trump 7, ♠Q, ♣J, ♠J, ♥J and ♦J no matadors are reckoned.

If the opponents have a sequence of trumps from the top, they are not called matadors.

== Deal ==
The dealer deals 7 cards each in 3 rounds.

== Contracts ==
Forehand opens the bidding by passing or naming one of the following contracts. Players then call in turn; they may only make one bid and must overcall all earlier bids or pass. The contracts in ascending order are:

- Longest suit (Længdemelding): This is the normal game in which the declarer undertakes to make at least 4 tricks together with a partner. Players may bid any number from "1" to "7", but the maximum allowed bid is the number of trumps (including permanent trumps) that the player has in hand if this suit is entrumped. The trump suit is only announced when the auction is over.
- Better (Bedre): a bid to play with the same number of trumps but in Clubs. Clubs is thus a preference suit.
- Malheur (Malør): A player with both black Queens may bid "Malheur with [e.g.] the Ace of Hearts". This means that the player with that Ace determines the trump suit. The bid corresponds to a Halve in Acemaker Whist. There is another expression for "malør" which is especially common in the countryside: "A groser te 'ru'er ess".
- Solo: The declarer undertakes to take at least 4 of the 7 tricks without the aid of a partner.
- Solo Couleur (Solo Kulør (Note: Literally a "suit Solo".)): A Solo in Clubs.

In addition, the declarer's team (or declarer alone in a Solo) may announce a Tout which is an undertaking to take all the tricks. This may be announced during play, but no later than after the play to the second trick. A Tout may also be announced by saying "I'm/We're playing through" (at spille igennem) or "A through player" (en gennemspiller). In north Jutland they say "We're playing to jan everything" (A spiller ijannem!).

== Play ==
Forehand leads to the first trick and the winner of a trick leads to the next one. Players must follow suit if able; otherwise may trump or discard. Because trumps are the declarer's long suit, the side suits are of minor importance. When the declaring side or the opponent have taken 4 tricks, the game is over. However, in partnership games, the declarer's partner must always have been revealed by playing the called Ace before the game can be confirmed as over. If the winners take the first 4 tricks in a row, the opponents are "janned" (they are Jan), which costs extra. It is thus irrelevant whether, for example, the declarer won the auction with a bid of "2" or a "6". Four tricks must be taken to win. An exception is occurs when a Tout is announced. In this case all 7 tricks must be taken by the declaring side or the game is lost.

== Scoring ==
The losers pay the winning player(s) according to the following rules and tariffs:

Simple win: 2 jetons (2 øre in former times) Win with Jan: plus 2 jetons. Win if Clubs are trumps: x 2 Each matador held: 1 jeton

The highest payout for a game is thus 15 jetons (øre) for a win with Clubs, 7 matadors, game and Jan (Spil og Jan).

If the declarer loses, the payout is doubled, but the opponents do not receive anything for matadors.

The largest payout for a lost game is 16 jetons for losing with Clubs, where the opponents take the first 4 trick winning the game and Jan. In a Solo, this increases to 3 x 16 = 48 jetons for a losing player.
