= Adelung =

Adelung is a surname. Notable people with the surname include:

- Bernhard Adelung, German politician
- Friedrich von Adelung (1768–1843), German-Russian linguist, historian and bibliographer
- Jakob Adelung, German organist, teacher, instrument maker, music historian, composer and music theorist
- Johann Christoph Adelung (1732–1806), German grammarian and philologist
- Sophie von Adelung (1850–1927), German translator, playwright, novelist and painter

== See also ==
- Mount Adelung, the highest peak in the Pskem Range in extreme north-east Uzbekistan's Tashkent Province
