= Scharwenzel =

Card game

- Old sailors' and farmers' game now only played on the island of Fehmarn
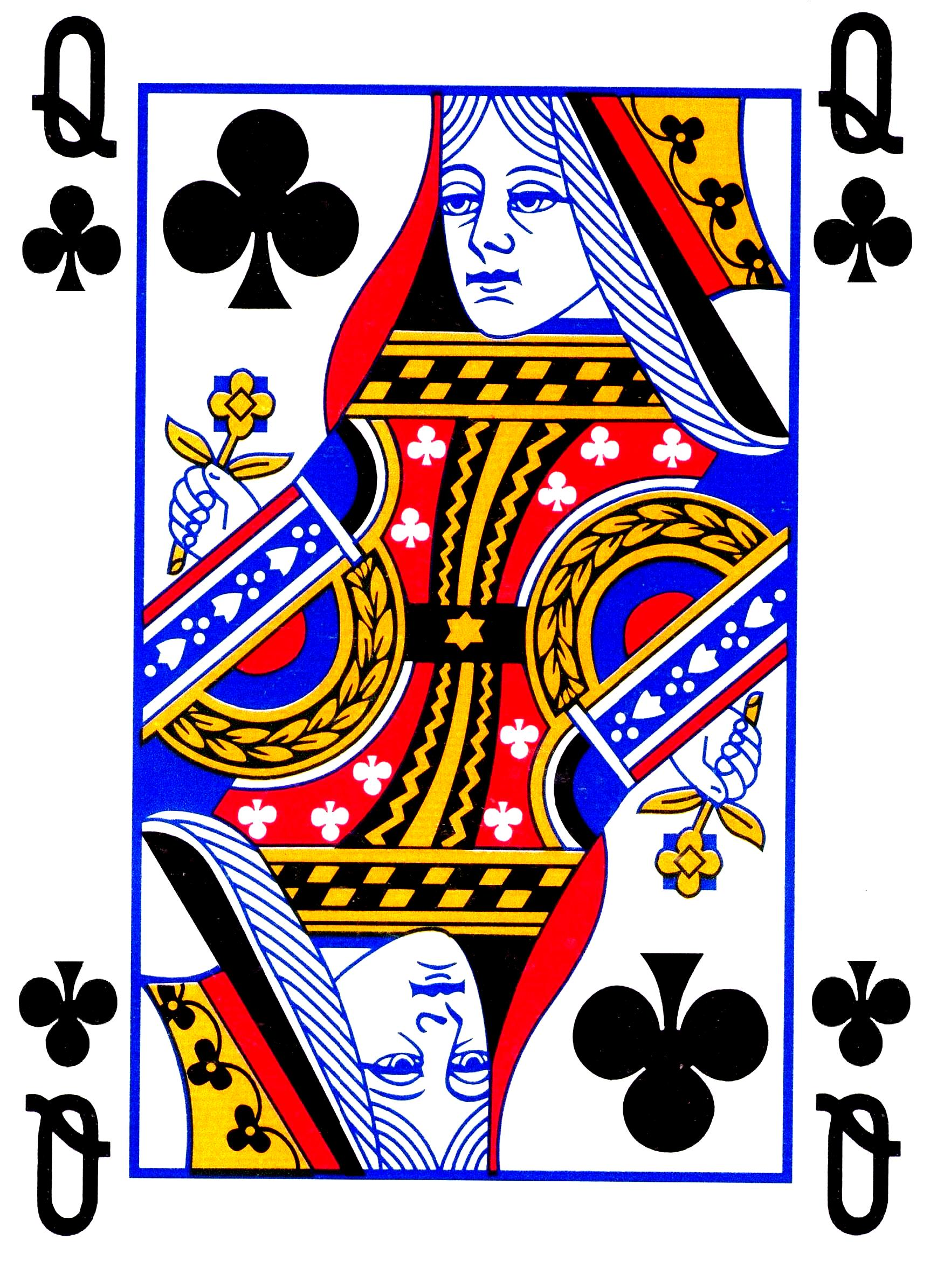
- The 'Captain's Wife' - the top trump in Scharwenzel
- Origin: Germany
- Alternative names: Schipper-Schrill
- Family: Plain-trick
- Players: 4, 6 or 8
- Cards: 32 or 36
- Deck: French deck or German Skat pack
- Play: Clockwise

Related games
- Schafkopf • Skærvindsel (Sjevinsel) • Solo

Scharwenzel, formerly also called Schipper-Schrill, is a traditional north German plain-trick card game of the Schafkopf family that is played by two teams with two to four players on each team. The game is at least three centuries old and is played today only on the island of Fehmarn in the German state of Schleswig-Holstein. It may be a regional variant of German Solo with which it bears some similarities and it may also have been ancestral to Schafkopf. It is not related to a different game called Scharwenzel or Scherwenzel that was once played in Bavaria.

== History ==
Scharwenzel has been played on Fehmarn since the 18th century and may have been introduced from Denmark. Apparently a game "of German origin" called Scharrewenselen was also being played in Holland around 1710 and Scharwentzeln was recorded in Germany in 1715. In Denmark, Schierwentzel is recorded as a gambling game in 1772 alongside Styrvolt, Cinq & Neuf, Passedix, Hypken, Trekort, Dutmachen or Highest Trump, Bys, Rusk and others, however these early reports may be referring to the popular but unrelated vying game of Scherwenzel.

The Danish variant, Skærvindsel, and the Faroese variant, Sjevinsel, (Note: The trumps, scoring and dealing are the same. A significant difference is that Sjevinsel is a round game for five players.) bear great similarity to the Fehmarn Scharwenzel. Sometimes the same terminology is used, e.g. the matadors (Matadoren) are called Matadorer in Skærvindsel and Makadorer in Sjevinsel. The game is probably related to Schafkopf.

As Scherwenzel, the game is recorded as being played at Yuletide in Anglia on the Jutland peninsula to the northwest in the 1840s. In 1910, Wossidlo reported it as a Mecklenburg game without, however, giving any details.

The word 'Scharwenzel' or 'Scherwenzel' used to mean a person who was overly polite and ready to serve out of self-interest those people from whom something could be gained. It may have derived from the Italian servente, or be composed of the words scharren ("scraping") and the name Wenzel ("Wenceslas") which is a nickname for the Jack. Hence it may refer to the fact that the Jacks in this game are subordinate to two Queens, whereas in other popular German games (e.g. Skat and German Schafkopf) they are the top trumps. Other colourful, seafaring-related names were given to the top trumps, such as Captain's Daughter for the ♠Q and Water Carrier for the ♦J (see terminology below).

== Overview ==
Scharwenzel is a trick-taking game in which players form two teams, "You" and "Us" (Ihr and Wir), who compete to win tricks. The rules on scoring vary from village to village. Since 2012, there has been a tournament on Fehmarn every November where the winner is chosen from 26 to 30 participating teams.

The overall aim of Scharwenzel is to score the most 'threads' (Fäden), recorded by lines on the scoresheet or slate. Threads are earned by winning a game i.e. 24 points. Points are earned by winning the majority of the tricks in a particular deal.

== Cards ==
A French-suited pack of 32 or 36 cards is used; the number of cards depending on the number of players. There is only a trump Queen when the trump suit is hearts or diamonds, because the Queens of clubs and spades are permanent trumps, formerly known as the Captain's Wife and Captain's Daughter, but later called Olsch and Basta respectively. The trump 6 only appears in six-hand games, because only 32 cards are used when there are four or eight players.

Recently, the Fehmarn Tourist Office has marketed bespoke cards for the "historic game of Scharwenzel". These are 36-card, French-suited packs with seaside motifs that come in a boxed set with scorecards and a set of rules.

The ranking of the cards is:

Card ranking (in 4- or 8-player games)
Trump suit
♣Q T7 ♠Q ♣J ♠J ♥J ♦J TA TK (TQ) T10 T9 T8
Plain suits (when not the trump suit)
Clubs	Spades	Hearts	Diamonds
♣A ♣K ♣10 ♣9 ♣8 ♣7	♠A ♠K ♠10 ♠9 ♠8 ♠7	♥A ♥K ♥Q ♥10 ♥9 ♥8 ♥7	♦A ♦K ♦Q ♦10 ♦9 ♦8 ♦7

== Play ==
The following is based on McLeod and Detlef.

=== Teams ===
Cards are dealt to determine the teams. The players with the same suit colour are on the same side i.e. if the first player is dealt a red card such as the Nine of Diamonds, the next player to receive a red card becomes his Macker ("mucker" i.e. "partner"). In four-hand games, the Mackers sit opposite one another. In six- or eight-hand games the players from opposing sides sit in alternate seats.

=== Bidding ===
The cards are shuffled, then offered to the right for cutting. In clockwise order beginning with forehand (on the dealer's left), players are then dealt all the available cards in packets of 2 or, for 4 players: 3, 2 and 3. Forehand then leads the bidding. Players bid the number of cards in their longest (potentially trump) suit or "pass" ("weiter" or "paß") if they have 2 or fewer in every suit. Each bid must exceed the previous one or the player must pass. Players may overbid either with a higher number of cards in one suit or, if their longest suit is clubs, by bidding the same number i.e. by declaring "4 better" (4 besser or 4 echt) if the current highest bid is 4 and they have 4 clubs. The winning bidder announces the trump suit. If everyone passes (only possible in the eight-hand game), a game is played in which clubs are trumps and usually results in a draw or Bock, whereby the points are carried forward.

=== Trick-taking ===
Forehand leads to the first trick. Players must follow suit or, if unable, they may play any card. The trick is won by the highest trump or, if no trump is played, the highest card of the led suit. The winner leads to the next trick.

Because players are not allowed to disclose to their own side which cards they hold, a member of the opposing team always sits between two players. Nevertheless, players are allowed to suggest their teammates should play a heart, for example, by saying something like "everyone has a heart".

=== Scoring ===
Scoring is a combination of points, threads (Fäden (Note: Singular: Faden)), drawn as lines (l) and hooks (Haken), drawn as an inverted L (┐):

Scoring system
Win/Bonus	Explanation	Points	Threads (l)	Hooks (┐)
Double win (Clubs)	Winning majority of tricks with clubs as trumps	4	–	–
Single win (Clubs)	As above but all players had passed	2	–	–
Single win	Winning majority of tricks with other suit as trumps	2	–	–
"For the first" (für die ersten)	Reaching majority without opponents taking a trick	2	–	–
Matadors	Holding top 3 trumps as a team	3	–	–
Additional matadors	For every additional matador up to 7 in toto	1	–	–
Bock	Draw – points carried forward. Symbols: )( or ~~)(~~	2/4	–	–
Game win	First to 24 or more points. Symbol: l	–	1	–
Petersdorfer	Winning 24 – 0. Symbol: ⇑	–	2	–
Tout unannounced won	Taking every trick, "tout" not announced. Symbol: ┐	2/4	–	1
Tout announced won	Taking every trick, "tout" announced. Symbol:	2/4	–	2
Tout unannounced lost	Taking every trick, "tout" not announced	–	–	−2
Tout announced lost	Taking every trick, "tout" announced	–	–	−4

A hook is the equivalent of one thread plus a round of schnaps, and a Petersdorfer equals 2 threads. Based on this system, for example, a Petersdorfer and a thread is the same as 2 hooks and a thread. Where minus scores are shown, these are added to the opponents' score, not deducted from the losers' score. If a Tout is won, there are no bonuses for the first tricks or matadors, and no Bock can be claimed.

== Terminology ==
=== Top trumps ===
Scharwenzel was formerly known as Schipper-Schrill because it was popular with sailors, Schipper being German for skipper or boatman and Schrill being an old word for a gooseneck or a lubber. It should not be confused with Scharwenzeln, the Bavarian variant of Färbeln, which was a gambling game for two to eight players in which the Jacks or Unters, known as the Scharwenzels, were wild.

The top trumps had the following names:

Card names
	Original names		Later names	
Card	English	Low German	English	Low German
♣Q	Captain's Wife	Käppen sin Madam	Old Woman or Spadille	Oldsch or Spedilje
Trump 7	Cox or Coxswain	Stürmann	Seven or Manille	Söv or Nilje
♠Q	Captain's Daughter	Käppen sin Dochter	Basto	Basta
♣J	Carpenter	Timmermann	Clover Bower	Kleverbur
♠J	Bricklayer	Murmann	Spade Bower	Piekbur
♥J	Ship's Boy (Note: Literally "bud", but may be related to "knave".)	Knuppen	Heart Bower	Hartenbur
♦J	Dogsbody, lit. Water Carrier	Waterdreger	Diamond Bower	Rutenbur

The later names of the top trumps in Scharwenzel (left to right, highest to lowest) were undoubtedly imported from another game, probably German Solo which in turn used names from Ombre. The table shows the comparison:

Comparison of names of top trumps
Suit/rank	♣Q	Trump 7	♠Q
Names in Scharwenzel	Spedilje	Nillje	Basta
Names in German Solo	Spadille	Manille	Basta
Names in Ombre / Quadrille	Spadille	Manille	Basto

=== Other terms ===
In addition to the names for the top trumps, additional terms are used in Scharwenzel:

- besser – a game in clubs (as trumps)
- Bock – a drawn game
- in echt – a game in clubs
- Macker - a team mate
- Mackedors – matadors, the highest cards. If a team has the 3 highest matadors, for example, they get 3 bonus points.
- Petersdorfer – when a team reaches 24 points, but their opponents fail to score. It may be derived from the village of Petersdorf whose players were particularly good at Scharwenzel.
- Tout – a team wins every trick in a deal

== Literature ==
- _ (1957). Jahrbuch für Heimatkunde im Kreis Oldenburg-Holstein. Oldenburg: Arbeitsgemeinschaft für Heimatkunde im Kreise Oldenburg.
- Amaranthes (1715). Nutzbares, galantes und curiöses Frauenzimmer-Lexicon. Leipzig: Gleditsch & Son.
- Detlef, Annakatrin (2002). Frohe Feste feiern wir, Vol. 4. Nördlingen: F. Steinmeier. ISBN 3-9802267-6-X
- Handelmann, Heinrich (1866). Weihnachten in Schleswig-Holstein. Kiel: Schwers.
- Haselmayer, Johann Evangelista (1877). Handbuch der Orthographie nach den Berliner Konferenzbeschlüssen. Würzburg: J. Staudinger.
- Holmsen, Paul (1884). Kristiana Politis Historie. Kristiana: W.C. Fabritius.
- McLeod, John (2006). "Playing the Game: Scharwenzel" in The Playing-Card, 35 (2); 127–130.
- Parlett, David (1990). A History of Card Games. Oxford: Oxford University Press. ISBN 0-19-282905-X
- Wossidlo, Richard (1910). Aus dem Lande Fritz Reuters: Humor in Sprache und Volkstum Mecklenburgs. Leipzig: O. Wigand
