= Zwikken =

Dutch card game

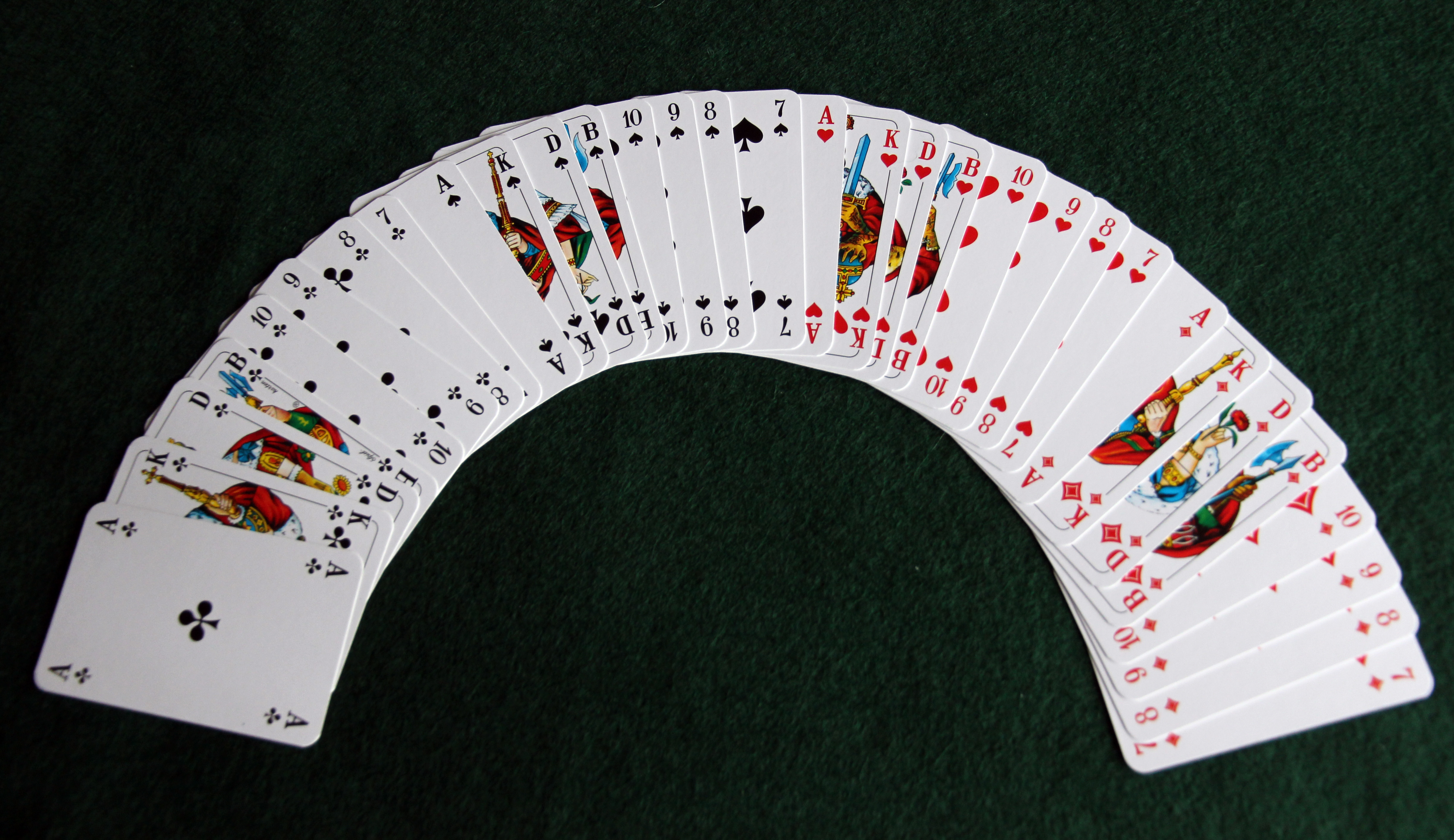
- French-suited 32-card pack
- Origin: Netherlands
- Type: Plain-trick game
- Players: 3-6
- Cards: 32
- Deck: Jass pack
- Rank (high→low): A K Q J 10
- Play: Clockwise
- Features: pot, 3 cards, zwiks, turning again

Zwikken (pronounced "tsvikken") is a Dutch gambling game of the trick-and-trump type using playing cards and designed for three to six players. It is "an old soldiers' game".

== History ==
Zwikken is an old Dutch game of French origin, sometimes called in English Dutch Gleek. It may be related to German Tippen. In the Netherlands it is illegal to play the game in public.

== Zwikken (mid-19th century) ==
The following is a summary of mid-19th century rules from the compendium, Nieuwe Beschrijving der Meest Gebruikelijke Kaartspelen ("New Description of the Most Common Card Games").

The game is played by three to six people, but four or five is most common. A full pack of 52 cards is used or, if only three play, a Jass pack of 32 cards will suffice. The dealer antes 3 stakes to the pot then deals three cards each in clockwise order before turning the next for trump.

A round of bidding follows in which players elect to "play" or "pass" i.e. drop out. However, if agreed beforehand, then "just as in Lanterloo", all must play in the first and/or second hands, even if they are bound to become bête.

A player with 3 cards of the same suit wins the pot and the others are all made bête. (Note: Normally a player who is bête pays doubles the pot stakes.) If two or more players have a triplet, the higher ranking one wins i.e. three Aces beat three Kings, three Kings beat three Queens, etc. The highest combination is 3 cards of the same rank as the trump upcard, forming a quartet. If agreed, a player with 2 cards of the same rank as the upcard wins, provided no others have a triplet in hand.

If there are no combinations, three tricks are played for and each trick won earns a third of the pot. If two or more want to "play", a trump must be the led to the first and second tricks. Lacking trumps, forehand leads any card face down, as do any others who have no trumps. If no one has a trump, the trick falls to the player who led. Otherwise players must follow suit if able; if unable to follow, they play any card.

== Zwikken (20th century) ==
The following is a summary of typical 20th century rules drawn from several Dutch sources by David Parlett (1977).

=== Overview ===
The game is played with 20 French-suited playing cards comprising four suits of A K Q J T, as well as stakes in the form of chips, counters or coins. There are three to five players, three best. The aim is to take two of the three tricks or to take more points in a single trick than the other two tricks combined, the cards being valued as follows: Ace 4, King 3, Queen 2, Jack 1, Ten 0. A player may win without play by holding a zwik: 3 cards of the same rank.

=== Deal ===
Each player antes a stake to the pool. The dealer deals 3 cards each in two rounds of 1 and then 2 cards or vice versa. The rest are placed face down on the table and the top card turned for trump.

=== Bidding ===
There is then a round of bidding by escalation. Forehand opens by saying "I'll bid" or "pass". Once a player has bid, subsequent players must say "I'll bid higher" and then "I'll bid higher still". A player who has passed may not re-enter the current bidding round. If all pass, the dealer may choose (but does not have to) turn another card for trump. If a second trump is turned, all ante another stake and a new round of bidding begins. (Note: Parlett points out that sources are unclear what happens if the same suit appears, but suggests it doesn't matter as players may now wish to play for the bigger pot.) The dealer may turn up to three times in this way. If the dealer opts not to turn another trump, the deal ends and the next player deals.

If the pot is large, players may open by bidding for e.g. half of it, in which case, further bids are for a higher proportion of the pot (2/3 or 3/4) and the highest bidder must play for the whole pot.

The highest bidder becomes the "gambler" and must take two tricks or, if none makes two, score the highest number of points in a single trick.

Trump 10. However, before play begins, a player with the trump 10 may exchange it for the trump turnup. (Note: In some groups, its holder must announce possession bidding by saying e.g. "I have it and bid half the pot.")

Zwiks. Any player who now has a zwik wins immediately. In the event of two or more zwiks the highest ranking one wins. (Note: Some circles admit that 3 trumps beats any zwik.)

=== Play ===
Forehand leads any card to the first trick. Players must follow suit if able, otherwise must trump and overtrump if possible. The highest trump wins the trick or the highest card of the led suit if no trumps were played. The trick winner leads to the next.

=== Winning ===
Gambler wins on taking two or three tricks or, alternatively, on taking more points in a single trick than the other two combined. On winning the gambler sweeps the pool, otherwise the gambler doubles it. A gambler who bid on a part-pot, takes or pays the fraction bid.

== Zwikken (21st century) ==
=== Overview ===
All is as in 20th century Zwikken except where stated. The trick play is for points only and not two or more tricks.

=== Deal ===
Each player places a fiche or stake into the pot.

=== Bidding ===
Players bid by saying either "I'm asking" (ik vraag) or "I'll play" (ik speel), or "pass" (pas). A player who asks, indicates he or she has good cards and is likely to win a share of the pot. The game is always played over several rounds (round = fiches x number of players) or for the entire pot.

If several players ask, it is common to say "I'm asking better" (ik vraag beter) or "I'm asking even better" (ik vraag nóg beter). If someone has asked, there will be another bidding round, so players who passed initially can still decide to ask better. This mainly occurs if a player has zwiks (see below). The player who wins the auction becomes the "player" (speler) and the others are the defenders.

Turning a new trump is called 'searching' (zoeken). This may be done twice, so there may be up to three trumps in total. If a suit is turned that has appeared before, everyone is obliged to pass. If the dealer searches once, players add another stake, but the second search is 'free'. A dealer with poor cards may end the hand if all have passed and next player deals.

Trump 10. A player with the trump 10 may, in turn, say: "I ask and I know him" (ik vraag en ik ken hem) or "I pass and I know him" (ik pas en ik ken hem) or "I (pass and know him and) expect a better one" (ik (pas en ken hem en) verwacht een betere). This must be done in order to be able to exchange the 10 for the trump upcard, which may only happen just before play. If a search has been made and two or three trumps turned up, the player may exchange a 10 for an earlier trump upcard, and even exchange several 10s. If the player said "I expect a better one" and the same suit has been turned more than once, that player may choose which trump card to exchange.

Zwiks. As before, a player with a zwik wins immediately before play. During bidding a player with a zwik asks, but when bidding is over that player shows it and wins. The others lose (if they asked). The highest is a zwik in 10s, because another zwik can be made with the trump card and not with a zwik 10. A player with a zwik may also pass initially. If another player asks, the player with the zwik can ask better in the second bidding round. If all pass and look for another trump card, the player with a trump card has a new opportunity to ask for better. However, if all pass and the dealer decides not to search, then the player with the zwik has misjudged and no longer has a chance to ask. It is possible to form a zwik by exchanging a 10 for the trump upcard.

=== Play ===
Play is as in Parlett (1977). The defenders try to ensure that the player gets as few points as possible. If the pot is cleared, each participant must put in another fiche to fill the pot.

=== Winning ===
Once trick play is over, players count their points using the same scoring scheme as before. The one with the most points wins; the rest lose. If two players tie on highest points, everyone loses. A player who asked and wins receives (part of) the contents of the pot. A player who asked and lost must double the pot. Players who passed receive and pay nothing.

=== Additional rules ===
In the Achterhoek you can play Zwikken with additional "Lubbers rules". These rules are:

- The person asking may not lead the highest trump (ace).
- A player who has passed, drops out of the bidding, even if someone "plays" afterwards.

== Trivia ==
- In the film Het 14e kippetje Zwikken is played for large sums of money.

== Bibliography ==
- _ (1853). Nieuwe beschrijving der meest gebruikelijke kaartspelen. 5th edn. Amsterdam: G. Theod. Bom. FV
- Parlett, David (1977). Card Games for Three. Sevenoaks: Teach Yourself Books.
- Spruijt, Ton (1999), Total Dutch. Een Engels-Woordboek: Meer dan Duizend Woorden en Uitdrukkingen met Dutch, Vertaald, Verklaard en Toegelicht. Contact.
