= Friedrich von Adelung =

German-Russian linguist (1768–1843)

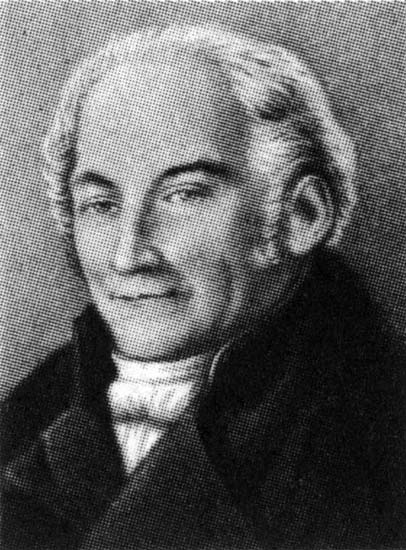
- Born: 25 February 1768; Stettin, Prussia
- Died: 30 January 1843 (aged 74); Saint Petersburg, Russia

Academic background
- Education: Leipzig University

Friedrich von Adelung (Note: Russian: Фридрих фон Аделунг, romanized: Fridrikh fon Adelung.) (February 25, 1768 – January 30, 1843), also known as Fyodor Pavlovich Adelung (Russian: Фёдор Павлович Аделунг), was a German-Russian linguist, historian and bibliographer. His best known works are in the fields of bibliography of Sanskrit language and the European accounts of the Time of Troubles in Russia.

== Biography ==
A nephew of historian Johann Christoph Adelung, Friedrich von Adelung was born in Stettin (present-day Szczecin, Poland). He graduated from Leipzig University, traveled across Europe and settled in Saint Petersburg in 1794. After a brief state service in Mitau (1795–1797), Adelung relocated to Saint Petersburg for the rest of his life. He assumed the role of a state supervisor for the German-Russian community, first in German book censorship, later (1801) as the manager of German-language theaters. In 1803 he was appointed as a tutor to Grand Duke Nicholas, the future Tsar, and his brother Michael. A collection of antiques compiled by Adelung and sold in 1804 to Vasiliy Karazin, founder of the Kharkov University, formed the nucleus of Kharkov University library. Adelung was an honorary professor of Kharkov and Dorpat universities since 1809. In 1819 Adelung joined the Foreign Ministry service, and in 1825 assumed control of its Institute of Oriental Languages. At that time it was the only college in Europe offering studies in Persian and Turkish languages. He was elected to the American Philosophical Society in 1818. In 1818 he became associated member of the Royal Institute of the Netherlands.

In the 1810s, Adelung promoted the idea of setting up a Russian National Museum dedicated exclusively to national history (in opposition to pan-European Hermitage Museum), later praised as a "local Russian breakthrough in museology." Unlike the Russia for Russians ideologists, Adelung specifically addressed the country's diversity with his plans to set up a repository for the sources in nearly a hundred languages spoken in Russia, and compiling dictionaries and grammars for the languages that yet had no established written tradition. Adelung believed that his linguistic studies were targeting not the languages themselves, but the history of nations and races.

From the end of Napoleonic Wars until his death in Saint Petersburg, Adelung was involved in sorting, reviewing and categorizing the European manuscripts related to pre-Petrine Russian history. He published biographies and critical assessments of Sigismund von Herberstein (1818), August von Meyerberg (1827), Conrad Bussow and other major sources on Muscovy; the work culminated in Kritisch-literarische Übersicht der Reisenden in Rußland bis 1700 (Critical bibliographical review of the memoirs by travelers into Russia prior to 1700). The book, published posthumously in 1846, earned the Demidov Prize of the Russian Academy. In a completely unrelated effort, Adelung compiled a bibliography of then known Sanskrit sources; an abridged version of his work has been since regularly reprinted (latest English reissue: 2008). All works by Adelung were originally written and published in German language.

Adelung's elder son Karl (1803–1829) joined Russian diplomatic service and was killed in Tehran together with Alexandr Griboyedov. Another son, Nikolaus, followed his father's profession and became an editor and publisher of his works. Nikolaus's daughter was the writer Sophie von Adelung.

== Sources ==
- "Аделунг, Фридрих" . Brockhaus and Efron Encyclopedic Dictionary (in Russian). 1906.
- Adelung, Friedrich von (2008). An Historical Sketch Of Sanscrit Literature: With Copious Bibliographical Notices Of Sanscrit Works And Translations. United States, Whitefish, MT: Kessinger Publishing. ISBN 978-0548884492.
- Andresen, Julie Tetel; Tetel, Julie (1990). Linguistics in America, 1769-1924. United Kingdom: Routledge. ISBN 0415022282.
- Aronoff, Mark; Rees-Miller, Janie (2003). The Handbook of Linguistics. Austria: Wiley-Blackwell. ISBN 1405102527.
- Burbank, Jane; Ransel, David (1998). Imperial Russia: New Histories for the Empire. United States: Indiana University Press. ISBN 0253212413.
