= Sophie von Adelung =

German translator, playwright, novelist and painter (1850–1927)

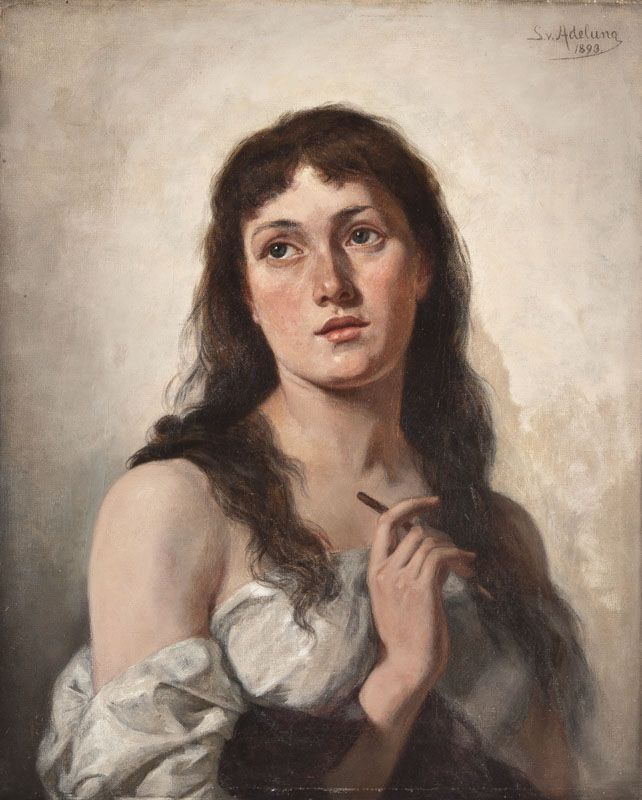
- Self-portrait (1893)
- Born: March 11, 1850; Stuttgart, Kingdom of Württemberg
- Died: June 15, 1927 (aged 77)
- Occupations: Writer; painter
- Relatives: Friedrich von Adelung (grandfather)
- Writing career
- Pen name: S. Aden
- Genres: Children's and young adult literature
- Notable work: Zwei Mädchenbilder in Pastell. Erzählungen für junge Mädchen

Sophie von Adelung (11 March 1850 – 15 June 1927) was a German writer and painter. She also published under the pseudonym S. Aden.

== Life ==
She was born in Stuttgart into a family of Russian origin. Her father, Nikolaus von Adelung (1809–1878), served as secretary to Queen Olga of Württemberg and was a privy councillor in the Kingdom of Württemberg. He was also the literary executor of his father, Friedrich von Adelung. Sophie's mother, Alexandrine von Schubert (1824–1901), was the daughter of General Friedrich von Schubert.

Sophie had several siblings, including a brother, also named Nikolaus, who became a well-known entomologist, and a sister, Olga, with whom she collaborated on various literary works.

Her writing, which she often illustrated herself, was primarily aimed at young readers. In addition to her original stories, she translated works from Russian into German. Her articles and stories appeared in periodicals such as Die Frau (The Woman) and Fürs Haus (For the Household). She also contributed to Töchter-Album (Daughters’ Album), a popular magazine edited by Thekla von Gumpert.

Her social circle included the pianist Maria von Harder, a former pupil of Frédéric Chopin, whose recollections of the composer von Adelung documented. She was also a cousin of the renowned mathematician Sofia Kovalevskaya, who visited the Adelung family as a young woman. Sophie von Adelung later wrote a memoir about her cousin, published in 1896 after Kovalevskaya’s death.

== Works ==
=== Novels and plays ===
- Zwei Mädchenbilder in Pastell. Erzählungen für junge Mädchen (1888)
- Russlana. Erzählung für junge Mädchen (1888)
- Kleeblatt. Drei Erzählungen für junge Mädchen (1889)
- Jugenderinnerungen an Sophie Kowalewsky (1896)
- Jugendbühne. Ernste und heitere Theaterstücke für die Jugend herausgegeben von Sophie von Adelung (5 volumes)
  - Band 1: Heinrich von Eichenfels, Die Schneckenvroni, Der Grösste
  - Band 2: Der Lumpensammler, Die Maikönigin
  - Band 3: Rosa von Tannenburg. Das Blumenkörbchen. Das Johanniskäferchen. (58)
  - Band 5: Der verzauberte Königssohn (nach einem Märchen von M. Chovanetz; 1897)
- Das graue Fräulein auf Scharfenstein. Hessische Volkssage (1897)
- Sonntagsfriede am Werktag (1920)
- Chopin als Lehrer (1923)
- Täubchen (1924)
- Hamsmelis Mäxle (1925)
- Der grössere Held und Das Professorle (1922)
