= Johann Friedrich Henckel =

German chemist (1678–1744)

Johann Friedrich Henckel (1 August 1678 – 26 January 1744) was a Prussian physician, chemist, metallurgist, and mineralogist. He taught chemistry and mineralogy at the Bergakademie Freiberg where his students included A. S. Marggraf, M.V. Lomonosov and Dmitri Vinogradov.

Henckel was born in Merseburg, the son of a physician, Johann Andreas and his wife, Anna Dorothea. After schooling at Merseburg Cathedral School (1685–94), he studied theology and medicine at Jena from 1698 after which he became a physician in Dresden. He received a doctorate in 1711 and moved to Freiberg.

In 1728, he was elected into the Leopoldina Academy. He moved back to Dresden in 1730 and began to work on minerals. He examined the chemistry of pyrites and believed in the formation of minerals through various processes such as crystallization and thus rejected the theory of instantaneous creation.
