= Flush (cards) =

Hand in card games

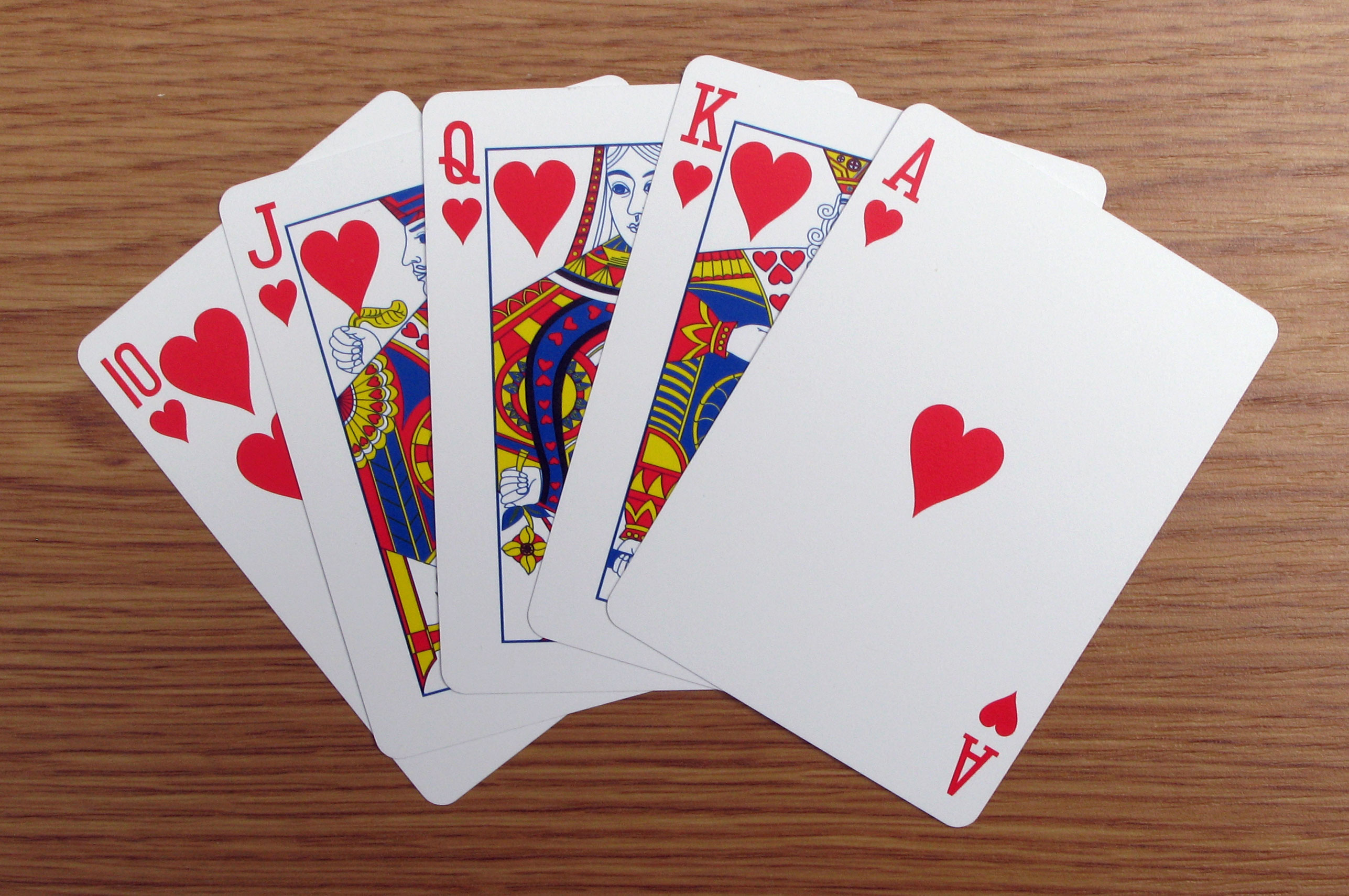
A royal flush in hearts

A flush is a hand of playing cards where all cards are of the same suit. There are different types of flush, including straight, where the flush is formed from a run of cards in unbroken sequence of ranks. Flushes are one of the types of scoring hand in poker.

== Etymology ==
The general meaning of the word flush is fullness or abundance, as there are similar meaning words in Dutch, French, Italian and Spanish. The words origin is 'fluxus' in Latin, which means 'flow'.

== Types of flush ==
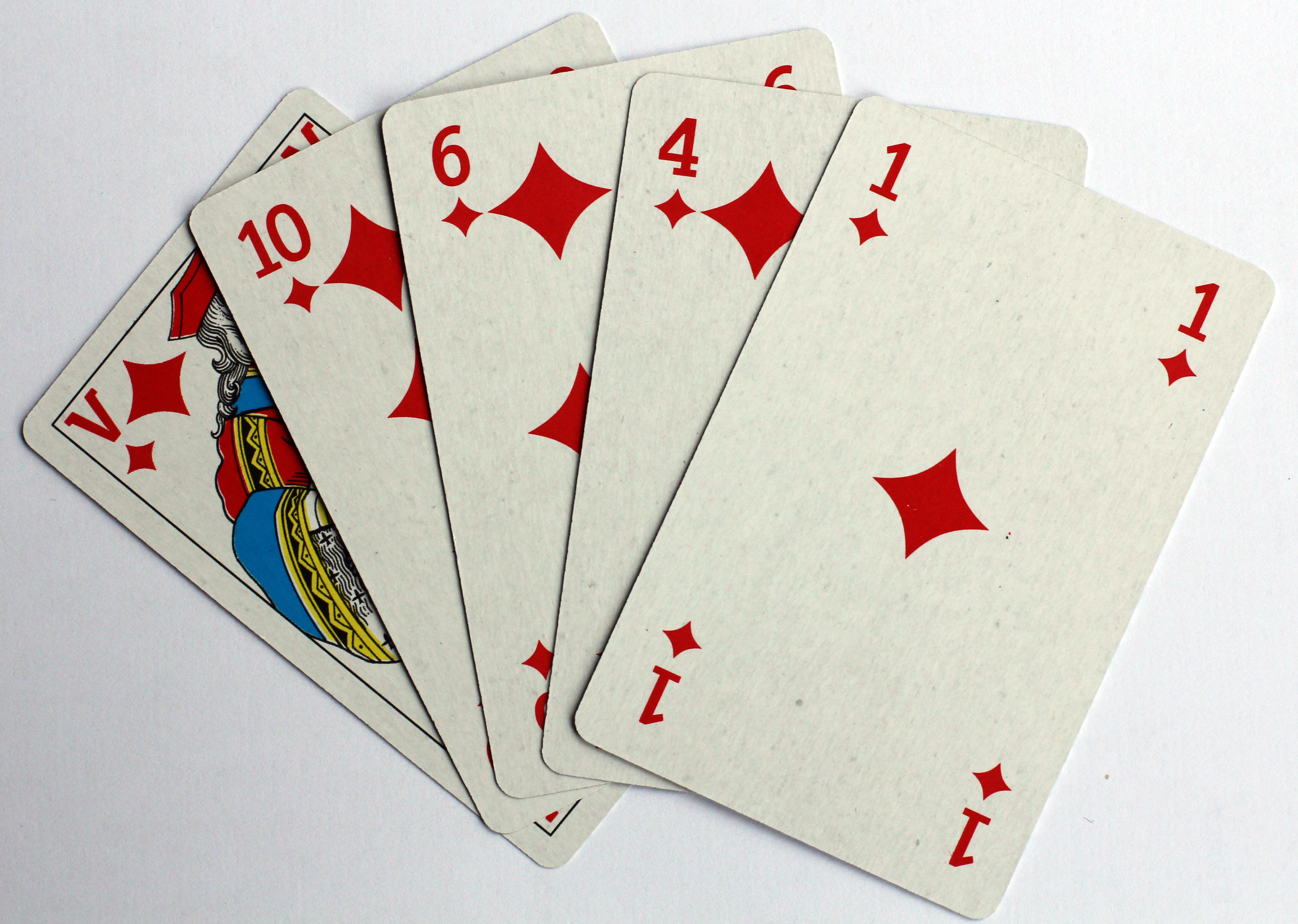
An ordinary flush of diamonds

Certain games recognise different types of flush. For example, in poker, there are the following:

- Flush: any 5 cards of the same suit
- Straight flush: 5 consecutive cards of the same suit
- Royal flush: an ace high straight flush, the highest possible straight flush
- Nut flush: any flush which it is impossible for another player at the table to beat.

== Examples ==
Four card flush in Spades	6 of spades 7 of spades Jack of spades Ace of spades
Five card flush in Hearts	3 of hearts 4 of hearts 8 of hearts 10 of hearts Queen of hearts
Three card flush in Clubs	4 of clubs 5 of clubs 6 of clubs

== See also ==
- Glossary of card game terms
- Flush (poker)
- List of poker hands
