= The Fool (tarot card) =

Tarot card of the Major Arcana

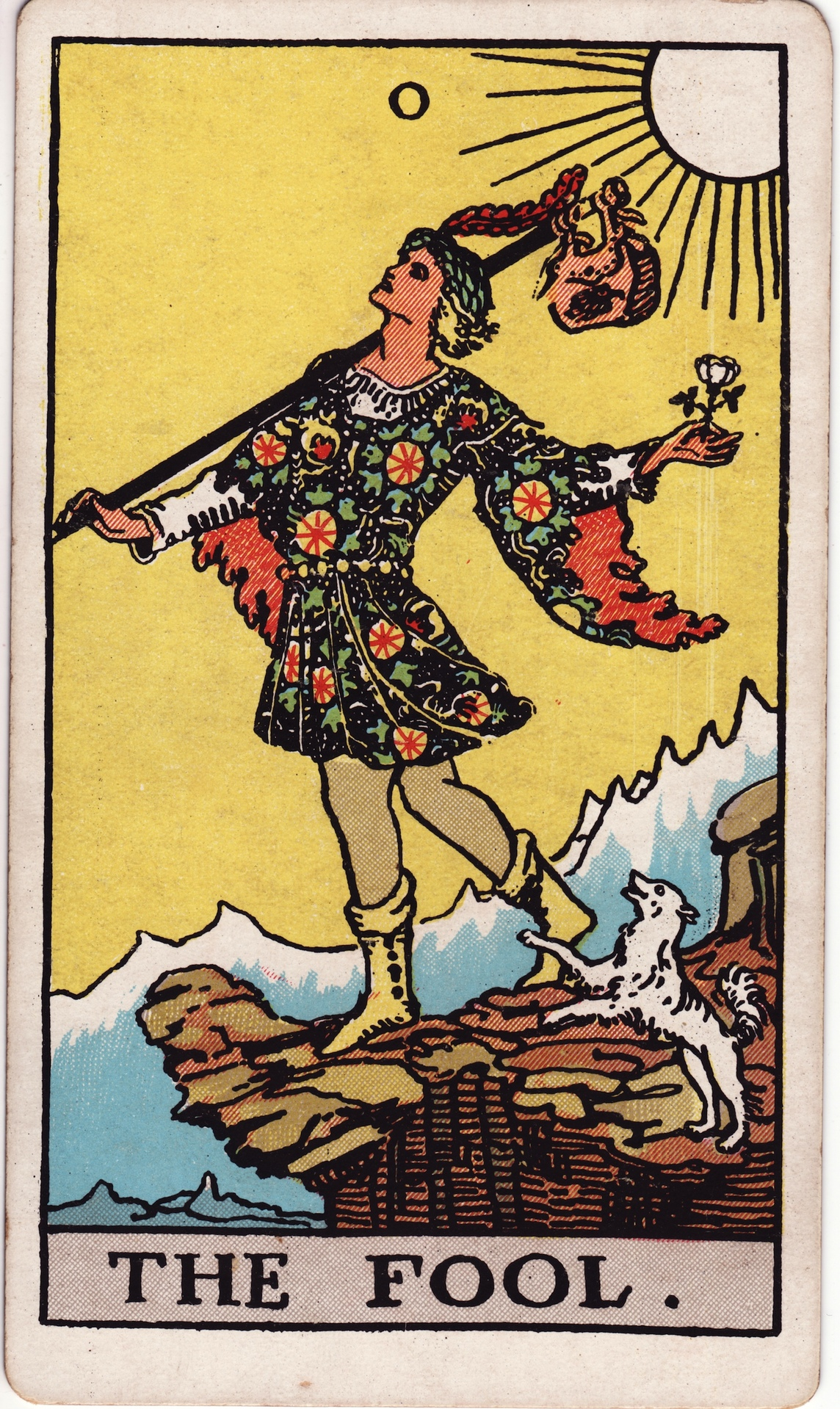
The Fool from the Rider–Waite tarot deck

The Fool is one of the 78 cards in a tarot deck. Traditionally, it is the lowest of the 22 trump cards, in tarot card reading called the 22 Major Arcana. However, in tarot card games it developed to be not one of the (then 21) trump cards but a special card, serving a unique purpose by itself. In later Central European tarot card games, it re-developed to now become the highest trump. As a consequence and with respect to his unique history, The Fool is usually an unnumbered card with a unique design; but sometimes it is numbered as 0 (the first) or more rarely XXII (the last). Design and numbering-or-not clearly indicate its role as a trump or special card in the specific game.

== Iconography ==
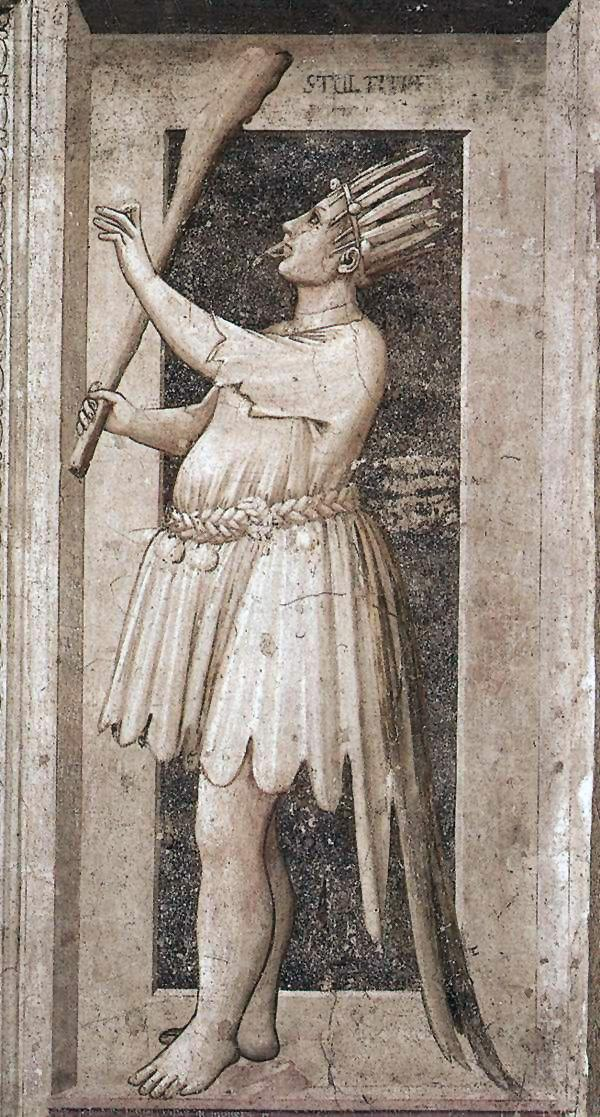
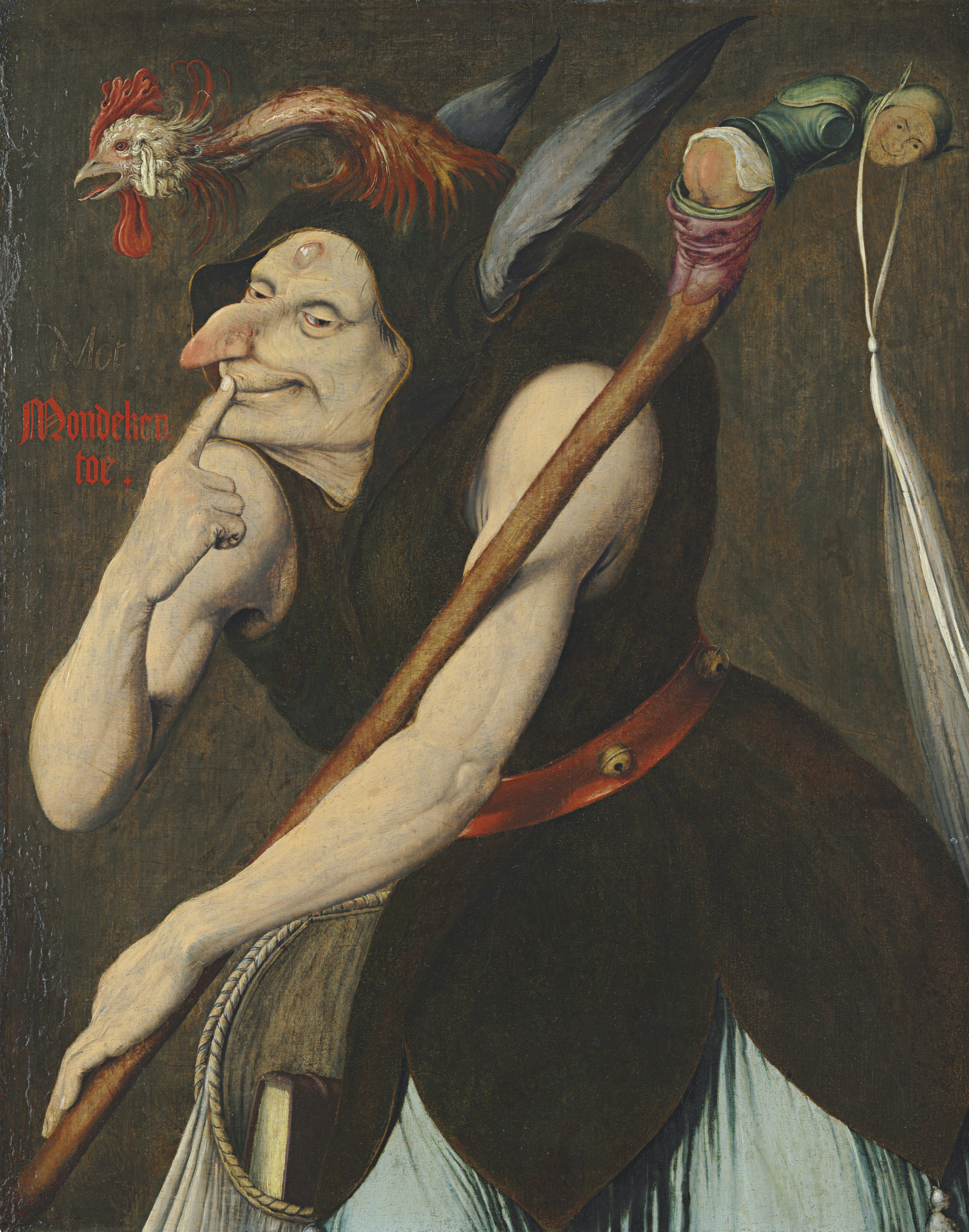
Standard allegories of Foolishness, painted by Giotto (1306, left) and Quentin Matsys (ca. 1510). The Fools in the earliest surviving painted decks resemble these depictions.

The Fool is titled Le Mat in the Tarot of Marseilles, and Il Matto in most Italian language tarot decks. These words mean "the madman".

In the earliest tarot decks, the Fool is usually depicted as a beggar or a vagabond. In the Visconti-Sforza tarot deck, the Fool wears ragged clothes and stockings without shoes, and carries a stick on his back. He has what appear to be feathers in his hair. His unruly beard and feathers may relate to the tradition of the woodwose or wild man. Another early Italian image that relates to the tradition is the first (and lowest) of the series of the so-called Tarocchi of Mantegna. This series of prints containing images of social roles, allegorical figures, and classical deities begins with Misero, a depiction of a beggar leaning on a staff. A similar image is contained in the German Hofämterspiel; there the fool (German: Narr) is depicted as a barefoot man in robes, apparently with bells on his hood, playing a bagpipe.

The Tarot of Marseilles and related decks similarly depict a bearded person wearing what may be a jester's hat; he always carries a bundle of his belongings on a stick (called a bindle) slung over his back. He appears to be getting chased away by an animal, either a dog or a cat. The animal has torn his pants.

In the Rider–Waite deck and other esoteric decks made for cartomancy, the Fool is shown as a young man, walking unknowingly toward the brink of a precipice. In the Rider–Waite Tarot deck, he is also portrayed as having with him a small dog. The Fool holds a white rose (a symbol of freedom from baser desires) in one hand, and in the other a small bundle of possessions, representing untapped collective knowledge.

In French suited tarot decks that do not use the traditional emblematic images of Italian suited decks for the suit of trumps, the Fool is typically made up as a jester or bard, reminiscent of the Joker often included with the standard 52-card deck.

== History ==
In the decks before Waite–Smith, the Fool is almost always unnumbered. There are a few exceptions: some old decks (including the 15th-century Sola Busca) labelled the card with a 0, and the 18th-century Belgian decks labelled the Fool as XXII. The Fool is almost always completely apart from the sequence of trumps in the historic decks. Still, there is historic precedent for regarding it as the lowest trump and as the highest trump.

Traditionally, the Major Arcana in tarot cards are numbered with Roman numerals. The Fool is numbered with the zero, one of the Arabic numerals.

The fool may be the precursor of The Joker. However, the Joker more likely evolved independently in the 1850s as a permanent trump specifically for the game of Euchre.

== Examples ==
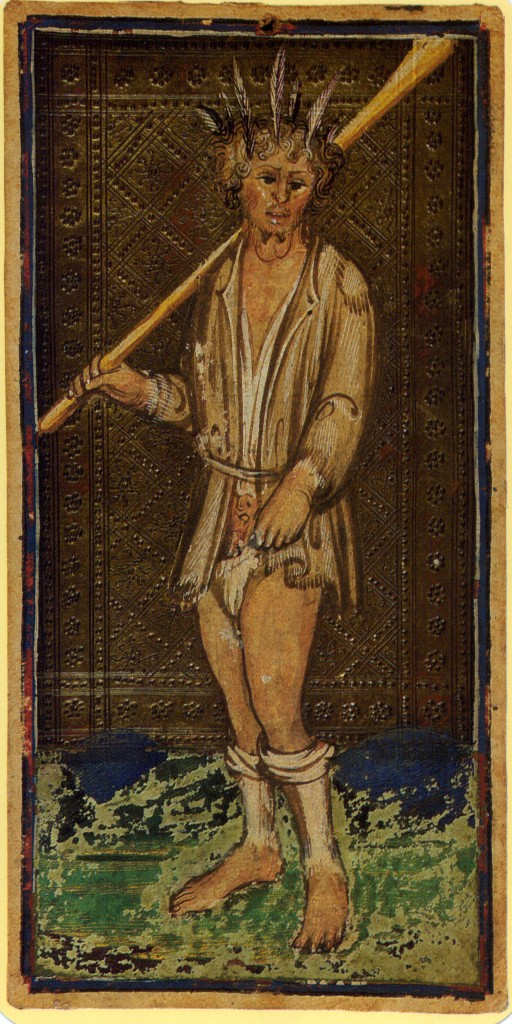
Pierpont Morgan Bergamo (c. 1451)

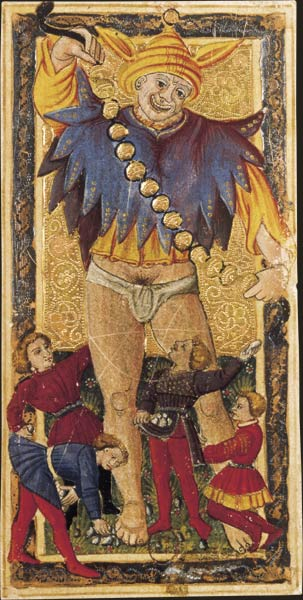
Charles VI (or Gringonneur) (15th century)

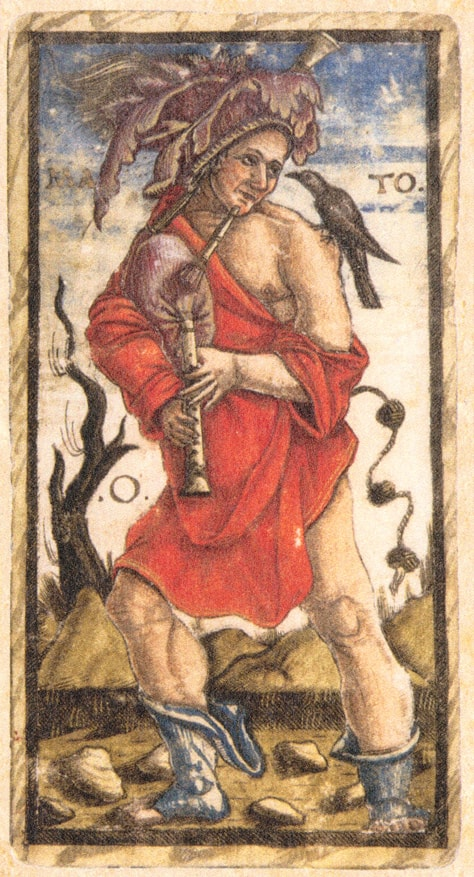
Sola Busca (1491)

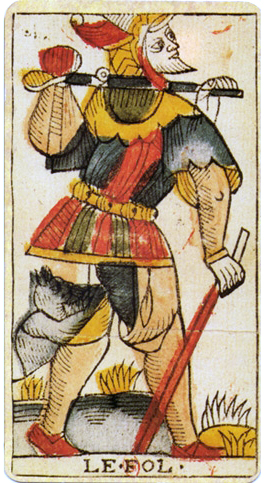
Jean Dodal (1701–1715)

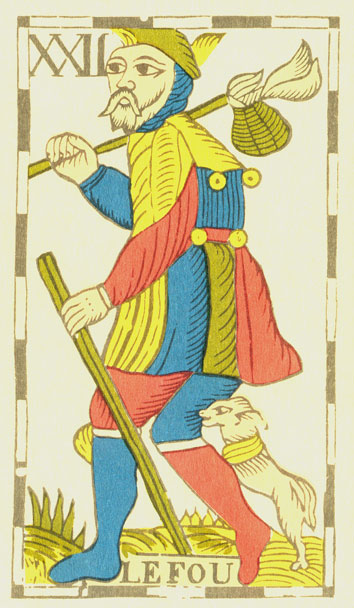
F. I. Vandenborre (1780)

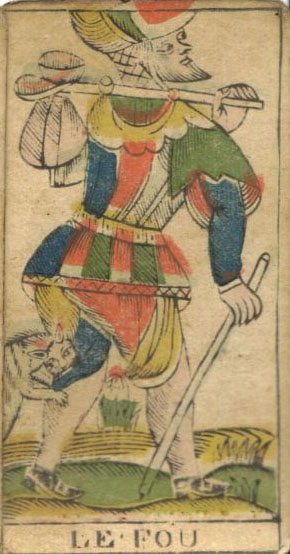
Besançon (c. 1820–1830)

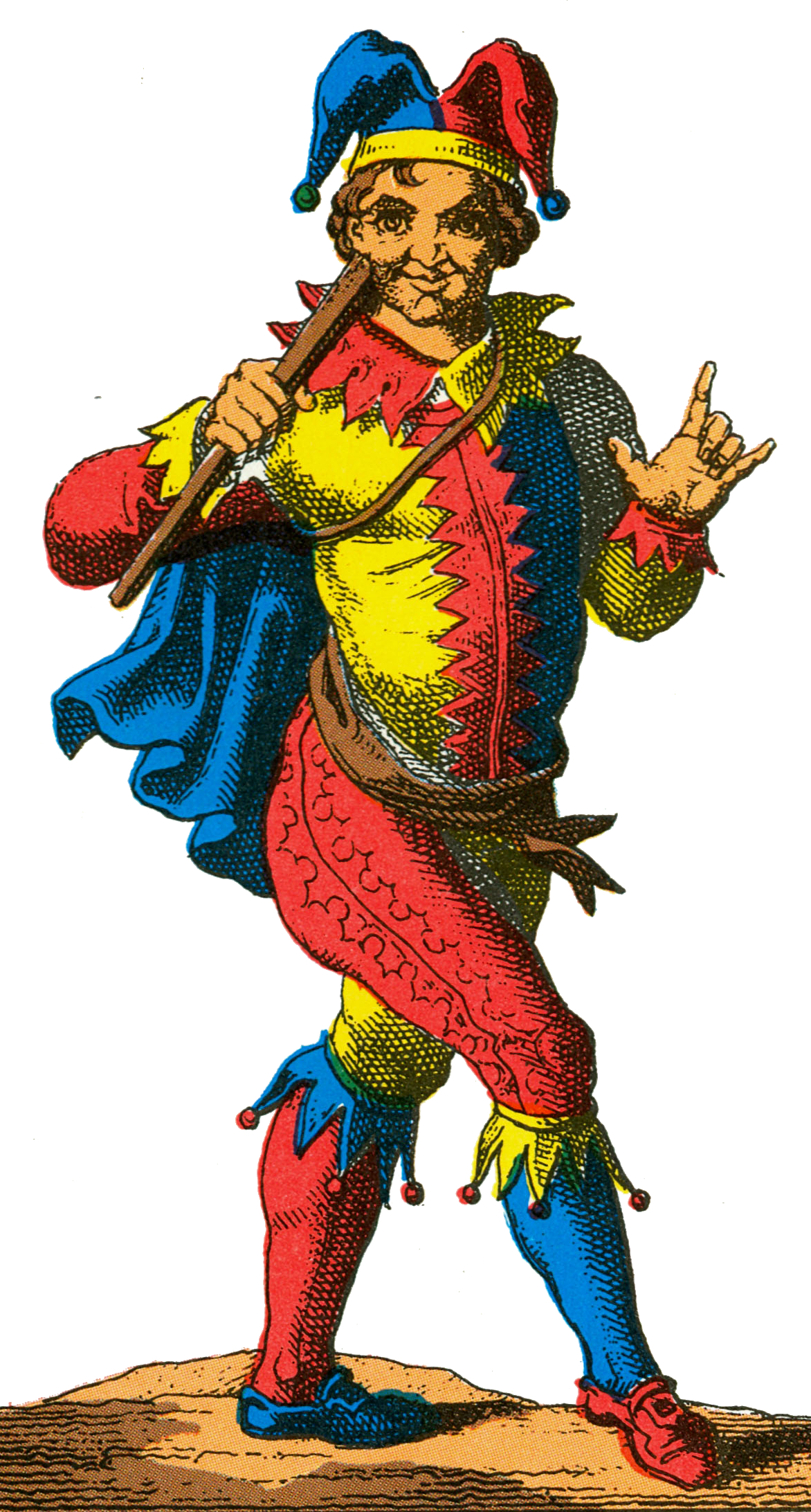
The Fool's tarot card, (c. 1831–1838)

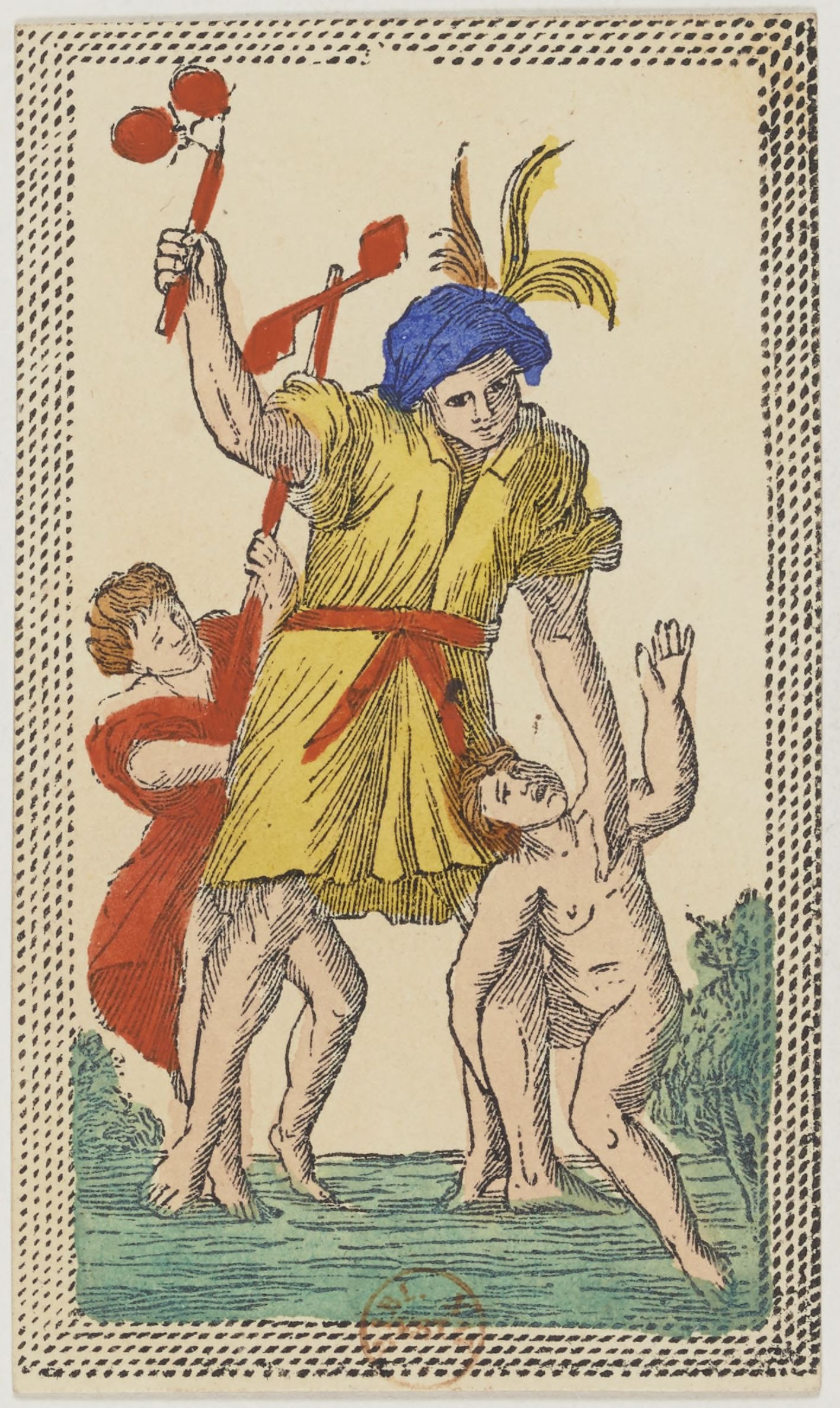
Florence Minchiate (1860–1890)

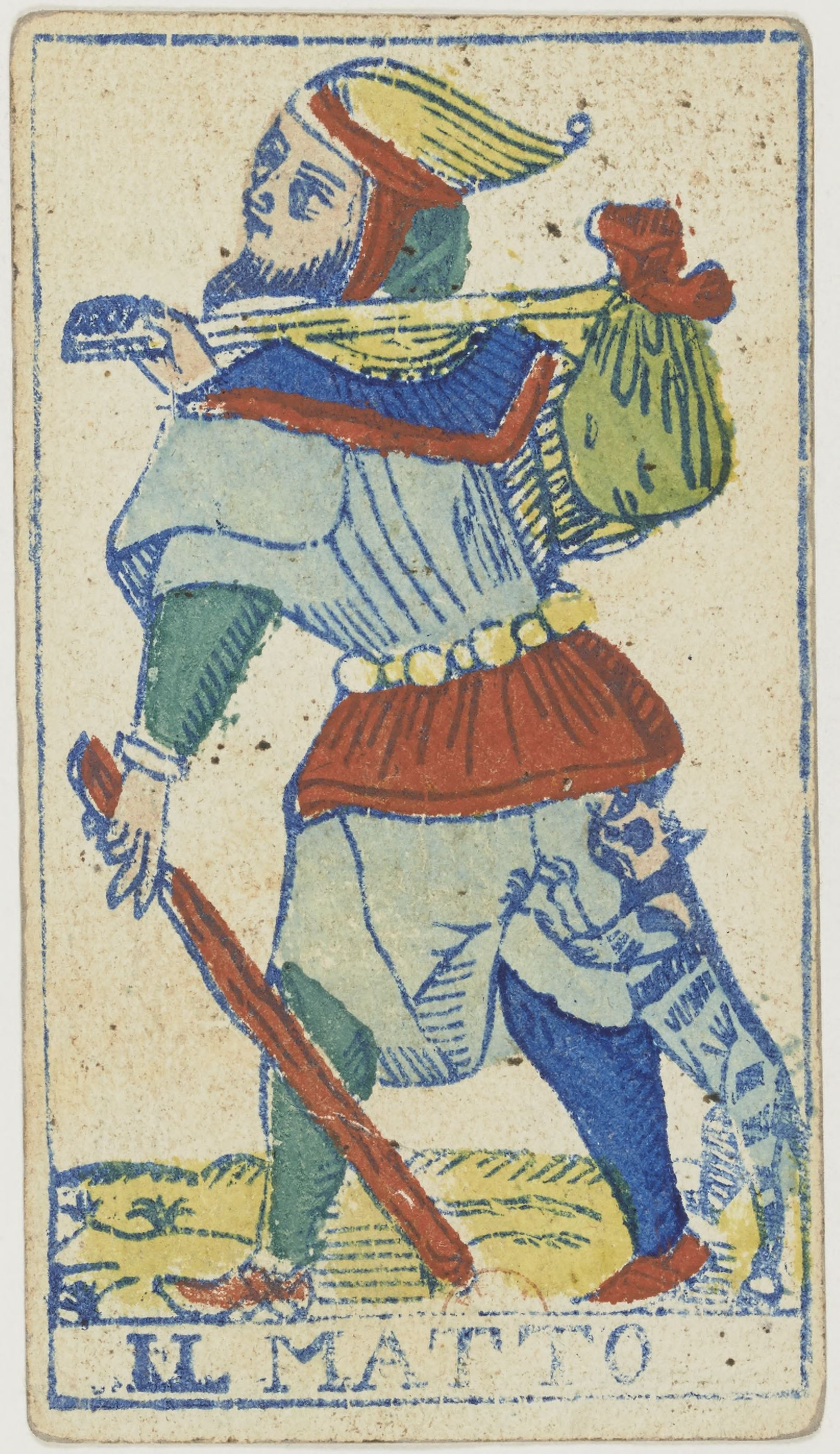
F. F. Solesio (1865)

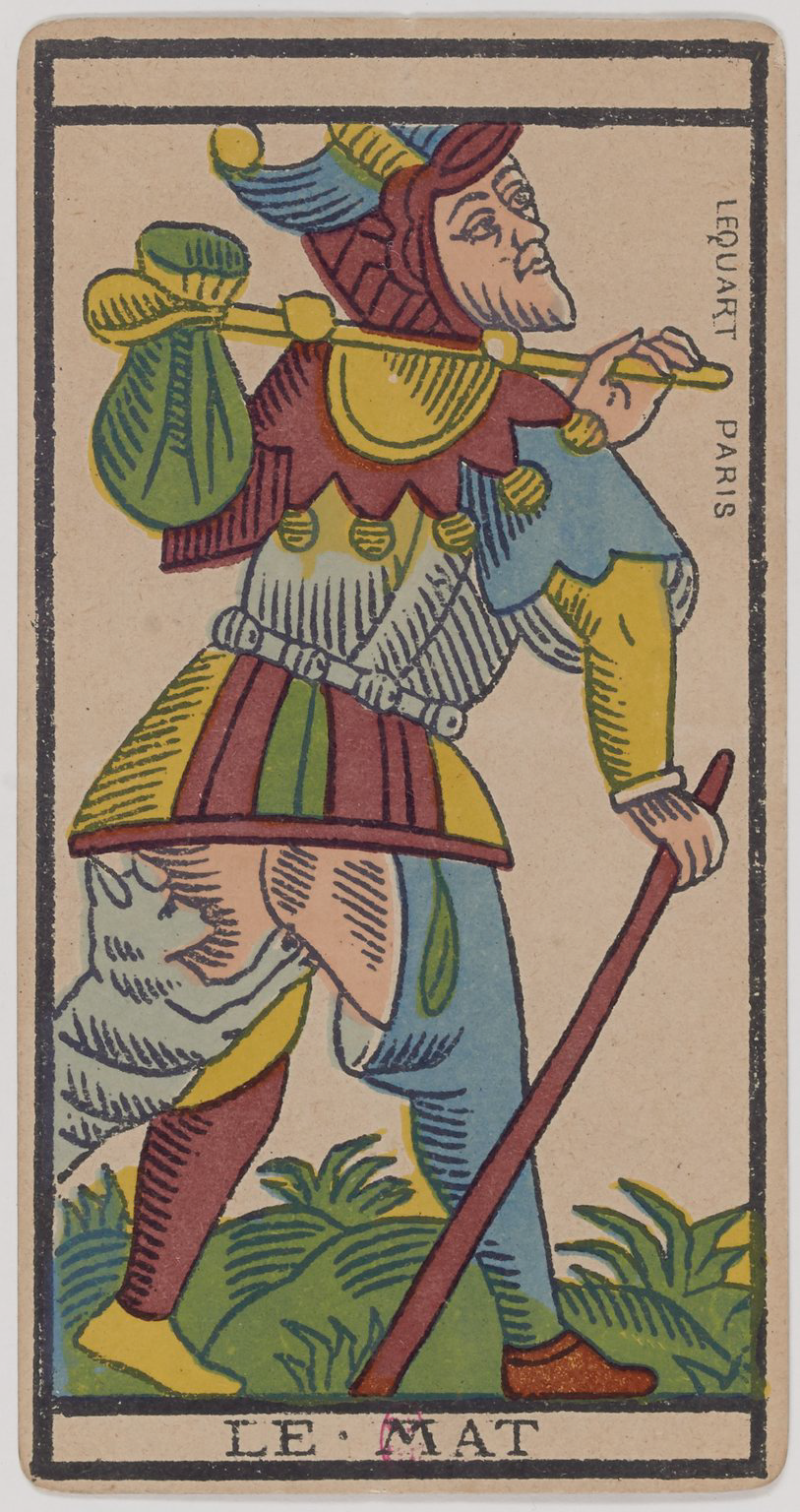
Lequart (1890)

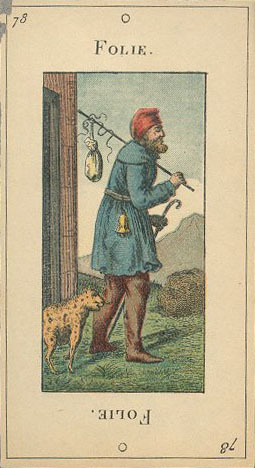
Grand Etteilla (c. 1890–1910)

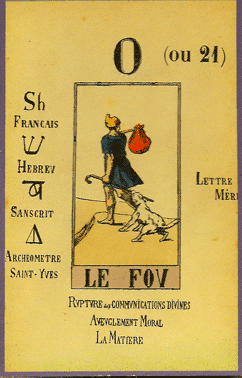
Papus (1909)

== In tarot card games ==
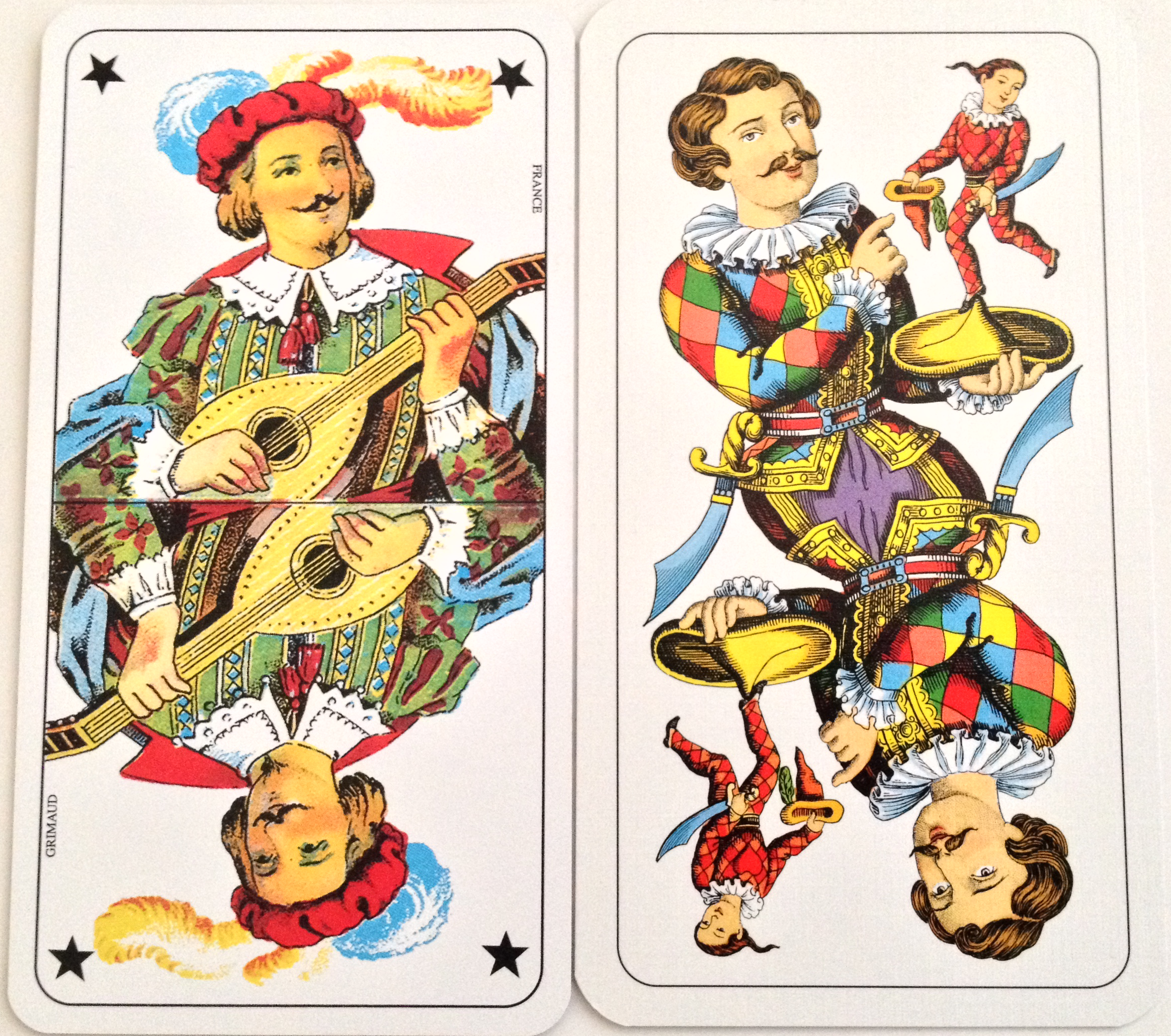
The two most common Fool cards in tarot card games, l'Excuse (left) of the Tarot Nouveau and the Sküs (right) of the Industrie und Glück.

In tarot card reading, the Fool is usually considered part of the Major Arcana. This is not true in tarot card games; the Fool's role in most games is independent of both the plain suit cards and the trump cards, and the card does not belong to either category. As such, most tarot decks originally made for game playing do not assign a number to the Fool indicating its rank in the suit of trumps; it has none. Waite gives the Fool the number 0, but in his book discusses the Fool between Judgment, no. 20, and The World, no. 21. The only traditional game deck that numbers the Fool 0 is the Tarocco Piemontese. Since the 1930s, Tarot Nouveau decks often use a black inverted mullet as the corner index for the Fool. In almost all tarot games, the Fool is one of the most valuable cards.

=== As excuse ===
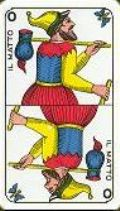
In Tarocco Piemontese, The Fool opens the sequence of trumps as the 0, but it is played as an excuse (so not a trump)

In most tarot games originating from Italy and France, the Fool has a unique role. In these games, the Fool is sometimes called "the Excuse". Tarot games are typically trick taking games; playing the Fool card excuses the player from either following suit or playing a trump. At the end of the trick, the player then takes back the Fool and adds it to their own trick pile and (in most games) gives the trick's winner the least valuable card from that same pile. If there are no cards to give in exchange, the Fool is worth one point less and an extra point is given to the trick-taker. Or, at the end of the hand, it can be awarded to a player or team that has won all the tricks. Usually the Fool can't be captured but in some games it can be won in the last trick which may yield a scoring bonus.

In a minor variant option of French tarot, a player dealt trump 1 but with no other trumps or the Fool can make trump 1 behave the same as the Fool (petit imprenable). However, in official tournament rules, a player in this situation must declare their hand and force a redeal (petit sec).

=== As lowest trump ===
The 18th-century Piedmontese game of Sedici and its variants treated the Fool as the lowest trump. Unlike most games, the Fool is worth only one point. This is similar to the role of the Miseria trump in Sicilian tarocchi.

=== As highest trump ===
The Trull, in Austria the valuable combination of the Sküs with the lowest and the highest-numbered trump. Notwithstanding its name, distinctive design and lack of a number, the Sküs simply serves as the highest trump here, the de facto XXII

In most Central European Tarock games, the Fool, or Sküs, is simply played as the 22nd trump, making it the highest trump in such games. In Königrufen, the Fool can be captured but only if it is played in the same trick with trumps 21 and 1 in which case trump 1 wins; this is called the Emperor's trick or Fairytale trick. In Hungarian Tarock, the player that loses trump 21 to the Fool traditionally has to wear a silly hat.

=== As excuse and highest trump ===
In French tarot and Droggn, the Fool is an excuse but in a rare circumstance it will be the highest trump. If the player who holds the Fool has won all the previous tricks, in the last trick the Fool becomes the highest trump.

In Troggu, the Fool is the highest trump but if it is the last trump in the player's possession, the player can elect to throw in another card instead of following suit. Once this occurs, the Fool is no longer a trump but an excuse that must be reserved for the last trick.

=== As excuse and wild card ===
Before and after trick-play of Tarocchini, the Matto (Fool) and the Bégato are called contatori (counters), a limited form of wild cards. They can be used separately or together to fill missing gaps in combinations or extend them but they can't fill in two consecutive gaps in sequential combinations. They can't replace the highest trump or kings. Both cards can be used in every sequence but as the Fool can't be captured while the Magician is vulnerable, the player holding the Magician would want to use it only judiciously.

In Grosstarock games, of which Danish tarok is the last survivor, the Fool can take the place of a missing card during declarations before play. However, a meld completed using the Fool is worth only half the points compared to a natural meld. Also, when leading a trick the Fool can turn into the weakest card of any suit the player chooses but it will be sent to the player's trick pile just like an excuse. If, however, the opponents lack the suit named, then they may get the right to set the trick's suit.

== Interpretations ==
In many esoteric systems of tarot card interpretation, the Fool is interpreted as the protagonist of a story, and the Major Arcana are the path the Fool takes through the great mysteries of life. This path is known traditionally in cartomancy as the "Fool's Journey", and is frequently used to introduce the meaning of Major Arcana cards to beginners.

According to A. E. Waite's 1910 book The Pictorial Key to the Tarot, the Fool card is associated with:

Folly, mania, extravagance, intoxication, delirium, frenzy, bewrayment. [If the card is] Reversed: Negligence, absence, distribution, carelessness, apathy, nullity, vanity.

== Encoding ==
The Fool is encoded into Unicode with the code point U+1F0E0, as part of the playing cards Unicode block.

Character information
| Preview | 🃠 | |
|---|---|---|
| Unicode name | PLAYING CARD FOOL | |
| Encodings | decimal | hex |
| Unicode | 127200 | U+1F0E0 |
| UTF-8 | 240 159 131 160 | F0 9F 83 A0 |
| UTF-16 | 55356 56544 | D83C DCE0 |
| Numeric character reference | &#127200; | &#x1F0E0; |

== See also ==
- Divine madness
- Sacred fool
- The Fool's Errand
