= Galician Tarok =

Polish Tarot card game

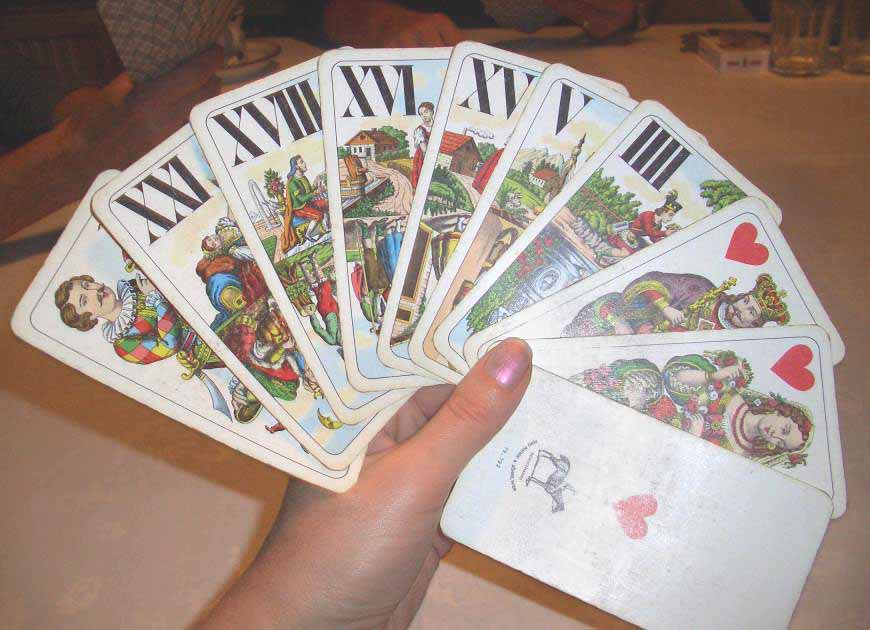
- Origin: Poland
- Alternative names: Tarok galicyjski
- Type: Trick-taking
- Players: 3
- Skills: Tactics, Strategy
- Cards: 42
- Deck: Industrie und Glück
- Rank (high→low): Trumps: Skiz, XXI-I ♣♠ K Q C J 10 ♥♦ K Q C J A
- Play: Anticlockwise
- Playing time: 20 min.

Galician Tarok (Polish: Tarok galicyjski) is a form of Tarot card game played by three players with a pack of 42 cards that was formerly popular in southern Poland. It is over 100 years old and may be related to the current Polish Taroki four-hand variant in which a King is called for a partner.

== Background ==
When Sir Michael Dummett published The Game of Tarot in 1980, he described in detail all the known Tarot card games at that time, but none were associated with Poland. In the early 21st century, however, researchers received word that Tarok was played in southern Poland. The reason was that this region was originally part of the Austro-Hungarian Empire in which games of the Tarot type were popular and what is now southern Poland, was then part of the Austrian province of Silesia. In 2005, it was confirmed that a four-player game was played in this area, notably at Zabrzeg, in which the Tarok XIX was called to establish partnerships. This was similar, but not the same as, Czech Taroky, and has been called Polish Taroki. In 2005, another variant was discovered, at a place called Kozy, in which a King was called. This latter variant more resembled Romanian Tarok in which bids are based on the number of cards taken from the talon, the talon cards are taken in stages, and a King must always be called. However, the bids and announcements and when they may be made are different. In Polish Taroki there is a penalty for the capture of the Pagat, as well as for the capture of the XXI or the called King. The Skiz is always the highest card and can never be captured.

The rules of the latter variant of Polish Taroki are quite similar to the three-hand game described here and John McLeod notes that it was tempting to call the latter "Galician Taroki".

== Rules ==
=== Introduction ===
An attempt to codify the rules of the Galician game was undertaken by J. Szczepański in his book, Zasady i Sposób Gry. ("Tarok. Rules and Method of Play") published at the turn of the 19th and 20th centuries. A summary of his rules follows:

=== Cards ===
A Tarot pack of 42 cards is used, traditionally of the Industrie und Glück pattern. The pack consists of 21 taroks, 1 Fool and 20 cards in 4 standard suits each consisting of: King, Queen, Cavalier or Rider, Valet or Jack and the 10 in black suits or the Ace in red suits. Tarok I is called the Pagat (pagatem), Tarok XXI is the Mond (mondem) and the Fool is called the Skiz (skizem).

=== Deal ===
The game is for three people and each player receives 12 cards; the remaining 6 cards are placed in a pile called the talon (talon).

=== Auction ===
There is an auction of bidding with immediate hold. Each player, starting with forehand, the person to the left of the dealer, may bid for one of the following contracts or "pass". The winning bidder becomes the declarer. The following contracts are available:

- Troika (Trójka). The declarer exchanges 3 hand cards for 3 talon cards.
- Dwoika (Dwójka). The declarer exchanges 2 hand cards for 2 talon cards.
- Yedinka (Jedynka). The declarer exchanges 1 of hand card for a talon card.
- Solo (Solo). The declarer opts to play from the hand without looking at the talon or exchanging cards. The card points in the talon count towards the opponents' score.

Players can also raise any of the first three bids to count double by announcing "bottom" (spód) or "second Troika/Dwoika/Yedinka" (druga trójka/dwójka/jedynka), to count triple by calling "top" (wierzch) or "third Troika, etc." (trzecia Trójka...), fourfold by calling "fourth..." (czwarta...) or fivefold by saying "fifth..." (piąta...) if the soloist loses. Solo is the highest bid and automatically ends the bidding. An earlier bidder may hold a higher bid by saying "yes."

The player who wins the auction becomes the soloist (or "player" according to Szczepański), exchanges cards with the talon and opens the game by leading to the first trick.

When exchanging cards with the talon, the declarer may only take cards from a specific part of the talon: in a Troika, either the first half without looking at the rest; or, after viewing the first half, choosing the second half in which case the game is doubled; the declarer may return to the first three, which trebles the game. In a Dwoika, a similar procedure is followed for the first, middle and last two cards. In a Yedinka, the declarer may choose any one card, raising the level each time a new card is looked at.

Before starting the game, the declarer may make certain declarations or announcements:

- Full hand (Pełnej Ręki). Holding 10, 11 or 12 trumps
- Volat. A commitment to take all tricks
- Pagat Ultimo. A commitment to take Tarok I in the last trick
- Trul. A commitment to take the Pagat, Mond and Skiz in tricks
- Four Kings (4 Króli). A commitment to take all four Kings in tricks

If successful, the player receives bonus points at the end of the game. When declaring a full hand, the soloist must reveal any tarok discarded when exchanging cards; these taroks do not count towards declarations, only those taroks held in hand count. Points for a full hand are only awarded if it has been declared.

The opposing team, the defenders (Pomagający, lit.: "helpers") can give the soloist a "contra" (contrę) whereupon the game counts double whether the soloist wins or loses. If the game was raised randomly, e.g. "Second Troika", both multipliers count in the case of a loss. The soloist may respond with a "recontra" (recontrą), in which case the game counts fourfold, but only if the soloist loses. The defenders can further respond with a "supracontra" (supracontrą), in which case the game counts eightfold if the soloist loses.

=== Play ===
Forehand leads to the first trick. When leading to a trick, a player may play any card. Players must follow suit if able, otherwise must play a tarok. Only if a player has no cards of the led suit nor any taroks, may any other card be discarded. The trick is taken by the player with the highest tarok or by the highest card of the led suit if no taroks were played. The ranking of a tarok is determined by its number - the highest is tarok XXI (the Mond) and the lowest is tarok I (the Pagat). The Skiz is the highest trump card and even beats tarok XXI. The player who took the trick leads to the next one.

=== Object ===
The object of the game is to score game points by taking card points in tricks and earning bonuses. The declarer plays alone against two defenders. During trick play the aim of the game is to score at least 34 points. In addition, one of the most important elements of the game is taking tarok I in the last trick, a feat called Pagat Ultimo which earns 50 bonus points (100 if announced before play). Card scoring is as follows:

Card	Points
Pagat (I), Mond (XXI), Skiz	5
King	5
Queen	4
Rider	3
Valet	2
Remainder	1

2 points are deducted for each trick. This means that the maximum possible number of points you can get is 66.

=== Scoring ===
In scoring the point difference between the soloist's actual score card points and the target score of 33 is calculated. Then points are scored as follow:

- Troika : difference x 3 + 30
- Dwoika: difference x 4 + 40
- Yedinka: difference x 5 + 50
- Solo: difference x 6 + 60

If the soloist loses, the difference between the actual score and target is calculated in the same way and multiplied by a negative multiplier appropriate to the contract (e.g. losing the second Troika counts as losing Troika twice).

Szczepański describes the punishment for revokes (renons) i.e. intentional or unintentional offences committed by the soloist while playing. In a revoke, the soloist loses regardless of the number of points scored and pays the defenders as if he had scored exactly 33 (so he pays 30, 40, 50 or 60 points). Whether the soloist receives or does not receive payment for bonuses during a revoke, or pays it to the defenders, should be agreed by the players before the game begins.

Volat. If the soloist wins all the tricks, the scoring is as follows:

- Troika: 300 points
- Dwoika: 400 points
- Yedinka: 500 points
- Solo: 600 points

If a Volat is announced before play, the game scores double.

Bonuses:

- 10 Taroks - 50 points
- 11 Taroks - 100 points
- 12 Taroks - 150 points
- Trul - 50 points (announced 100 points)
- Four Kings - 100 points (announced 200 points)
- Pagat Ultimo - 50 points (announced 100 points)

The points calculated in this way are "paid" by the losers to the winner (or winning team) - this means that the sum of all players' points is always equal to 0.

=== Winning ===
The game ends after an agreed number of hands have been played and the player with the most game points wins.

== Galician Tarot pack ==
X + 0	X + 1	X + 2	X + 3	Valet	Rider	Queen	King

21 Taroks
•

== Bibliography ==
- Dummett, Michael (1980). The Game of Tarot. London: Duckworth.
- McLeod, John "Playing the Game: Polish Taroki" in The Playing-Card, Vol. 40, No. 4, ed. Peter Endebrock, Apr–Jun 2012, pp. 257–260.
- Szczepański, J. [1903]. Tarok: Zasady i Sposób Gry. Kraków: J. M. Himmelblau. 47 pages (in Polish).
