= Tarot card games =

Card games played with tarot decks

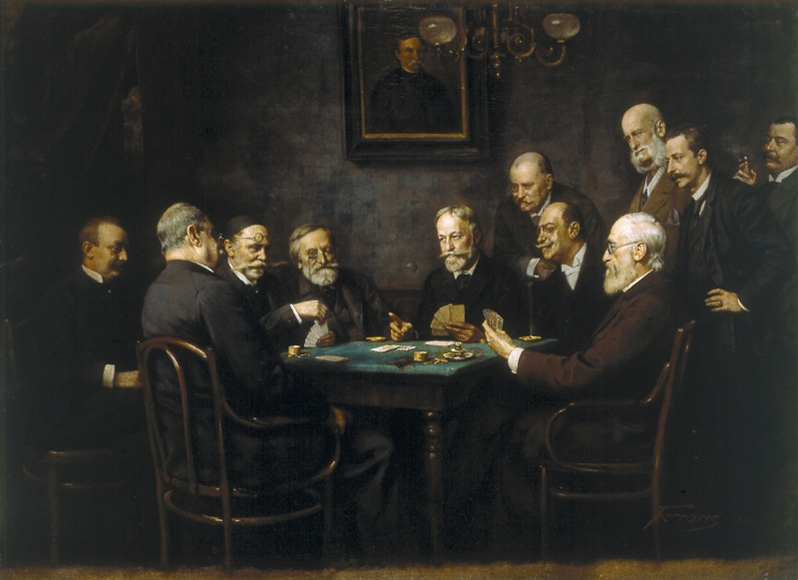
Hungarian statesmen playing tarokk in 1895, the preferred card game of the pre-communist era.

Tarot games are card games played with tarot packs designed for card play and which have a permanent trump suit alongside the usual four card suits. The games and packs which English-speakers call by the French name tarot are called tarocchi in the original Italian, Tarock in German and similar words in other languages.

Tarot games are increasingly popular in Europe, especially in France where French tarot is the second most popular card game after Belote. In Austria, Tarock games, especially Königrufen, have become widespread and there are several major national and international tournaments each year. Italy, the home of tarot, remains a stronghold. Games of the tarot family are also played in Hungary, Slovenia, Liechtenstein, Czechia, Slovakia, Switzerland, Denmark, south Germany and south Poland.

== History ==
The introduction of trumps is one of only two major innovations to trick-taking games since they were invented, the other being the idea of bidding. Trump cards, initially called trionfi, first appeared with the advent of tarot cards, in which there is a separate, permanent trump suit comprising a number of picture cards. In contrast, a different concept arose in the game of the contemporary game of Karnöffel. In this south German game played with an ordinary pack, some cards of the chosen or selected suits had full trump powers, others were partial trumps and the 7s had a special role. These features are retained in games of the Karnöffel family to the present, but are never seen in tarot games.

The earliest known example of a fifth suit of trumps was ordered by Filippo Maria Visconti around 1420 and included 16 trumps with images of Greek and Roman gods. A basic description first appeared in the manuscript of Martiano da Tortona, written before 1425.

From Italy, Tarot first spread to France and Switzerland in the 16th century and Belgium in the late 17th century. Then to most parts of Europe in the 18th century with the notable exceptions being the British Isles, the Iberian peninsula, and the Balkans. While there are many brief or vague descriptions of how Tarot was played in its first two centuries, the earliest detailed description of rules for a tarot game in any language were published by the Abbé de Marolles in Nevers in 1637. The abbot learnt this variant from Princess Louise-Marie of Gonzague-Nevers, who introduced some rule variations from the normal game. It was played by three players with a 66-card pack, obtained by removing the 3 lowest cards of each suit from a standard 78-card, Italian-suited tarot pack. Two players received 21 cards each. The dealer received 25, from which four were discarded. There were payments for declaring certain card combinations at the start, for playing the Ace of Coins and for taking the last trick with a King or the Pagat. The usual tarot rules or play and card point values applied. The winner was the one with the most points in tricks and was paid an amount by the losers based on the difference in scores.

Tarot decks did not precede decks having four suits of the same length, and they were invented not for occult purposes but purely for gaming. In 1781, Court de Gébelin published an essay associating the cards with ancient wisdom, the earliest record of this idea, subsequently debunked by Dummett. As a result of the unsupported theories of de Gébelin and other occultists, tarot cards have since been used for cartomancy and divination as well as gaming, although now fortune-tellers tend to use specially developed tarot decks rather than those used for games.

== Rules ==
=== Number of players ===
Tarot can be played by two to eight players, but the vast majority of rules are for three or four players. Players can compete individually or be part of a fixed partnership or have variable alliances that change with each hand.

=== Deck of cards ===
A complete Tarot deck such as one for French Tarot contains the full 78-card complement. It can be used to play any game in the family, with the exception of Minchiate, an extinct game that used 97 cards. Austrian-Hungarian Tarock and Italian Tarocco decks are a smaller subset, of 63, 54, 40, or even 36 cards, suitable only for games of a particular region. These games remove various ranks of pip cards to increase the chances of a void or short suit.

Regional tarot decks commonly feature culture-specific suits. In Italy (excluding Trieste) and parts of Switzerland, the original Latin suits of Cups, Coins, Clubs, and Swords are used. In Trieste and everywhere else, the French suits of Hearts, Diamonds, Clubs, and Spades are used. The trump suit does not have a suit symbol, they are ranked by large Arabic or additive Roman numerals.

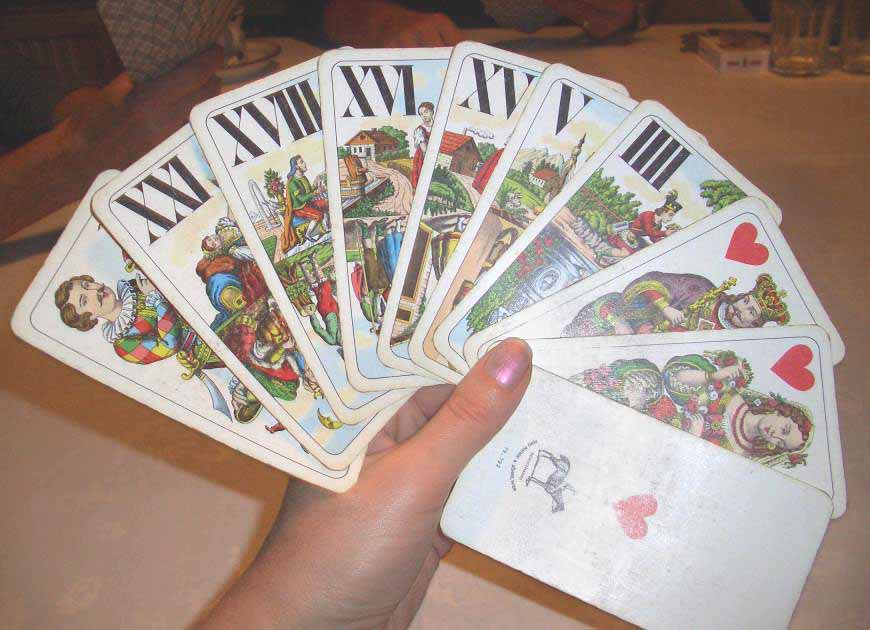
An Austrian-style 40-card Tarock hand: the Skys (Fool) as highest trump, trump 21 (the second highest), five other trumps, K♥, Q♥, and 1♥.

The 78-card tarot deck contains:

- 14 cards each in four suits (French or Latin depending on the region): "pip" cards numbered one (but called Ace) to ten. Plus four court cards, a Jack (or Knave or Valet), a Knight (or Cavalier), a Queen, and a King.
- The 21 tarots function in the game as a permanent suit of trumps.
- The Fool, also known as the Excuse, is an unnumbered card that excuses the player from following suit or playing a trump in some variations, and that acts as the strongest trump in others.

The 54-card 'Tarock' deck contains:

- 8 cards each in four suits (usually French), the "pip" cards being stripped out leaving 1 to 4 in the red suits (Ace highest) and 10 to 7 in the black suits (ten highest). The court cards remain the same.
- 22 Tarocks as permanent trumps, including the Sküs (the Fool) as an unnumbered Tarock XXII, the Mond as Tarock XXI and the Pagat as Tarock I, which are collectively known as the Trull or "Honours" and have a special role.

Due to the antiquity of tarot games, the cards are ordered in an archaic ranking. In the plain suits, Kings are always high. With the exception of modern French tarot and Sicilian tarocchi, the ranking in the Latin round suits (cups and coins) or the French red suits (diamonds and hearts) goes from King (high), Queen, Cavalier, Jack, 1, 2, 3 ... 10 (low).

For the purpose of the rules, the numbering of the trumps is all that matters. The symbolic tarot images have no effect in the game itself other than influencing the naming of a few of the cards (Fool, Mond, Pagat, Little Man). The design traditions of these decks evolved independently, and they often bear only numbers and whimsical scenes arbitrarily chosen by the engraver. There are still traditional sequences of images in which the common lineage is visible. E.g. the moon that is commonly visible at a corner of the trump card 21 in the Industrie und Glück stems from confusion of the German word Mond, meaning "moon", with Italian mondo and French monde, meaning "world", the usual symbol associated with the trump card 21 on Italian-suited tarots.

=== Basic rules of play ===
- Play is typically anti-clockwise; the player to the right of the dealer plays to the first trick. Players must follow suit if they have a card of the suit led, otherwise they must play a trump if possible. The winner of each trick leads to the next.
- After the hand has been played, a score is taken based on the point values of the cards in the tricks each player has managed to capture.

=== Common card values ===
The aim in almost all card games of the Tarot family is to make as many points as possible from the cards taken in tricks, the cards having different point values. Those cards which have little or no point value are called various names – Skartins, Ladons or cartes basses depending on the region – but may be referred to as low cards.

Cards which have a higher point value may be called counting cards or counters. They usually include the Fool (Excuse or Sküs), the I (Pagat Petit, Bagatto or Little Man) and the XXI (Mond) plus all the court cards. In such a case, the low cards are the remaining tarots (II to XX) and all the pip cards. Not all games follow this precisely. In some games, other cards are included among the counters. However, the division of counters and low cards described is the most common and is often accompanied by the following 'standard' card values:

The Trull, the highest-valued trumps in Central European Tarock games

- Oudlers or Trull cards – Trumps I, XXI and the Fool: 5 points
- Kings: 5 points
- Queens: 4 points
- Cavaliers or Knights: 3 points
- Knaves, Valets or Jacks: 2 points
- Low cards: 1 point

=== Tarot scoring ===
The system by which players work out their scores in almost all Tarot games may appear "eccentric and puzzling", but the rationale to it is that, originally, the cards were each valued at one less point than that shown above (e.g. Kings were worth 4 points and low cards had no point value), but every trick taken scored one point. Dummett argues that the tedious work of counting tricks and card points separately led players to fuse the two processes into a single operation. There are several practical methods, but all are designed to achieve the same aim: a quick and relatively simple way of calculating the score.

A very common system used in many 54-card Tarock games is counting in packets of three. (Note: Zählen in Dreierlagen) Under the original scoring scheme, the pack would have been worth 52 points and there would have been 18 points for the 18 tricks making a total of 70 points in total; thus, in most cases, a declarer needs 36 points to win. (Note: Using the modern card point scheme shown would produces a theoretical total of 106 points for the pack.) Mayr and Sedlaczek described 3 common systems:

==== Counting in threes with low cards ====
The first, easiest and oldest method is counting in threes with low cards. (Note: Zählen in Dreierlagen mit Leerkarten) A player gathers the cards won in tricks and groups them into triplets each comprising one counting card and two low cards. Each triplet scores the value of the counter only e.g. a Queen and two low cards scores 4. A triplet of three low cards scores exactly 1 point. In some games, players may end up with one or two cards over. Two remaining low cards are rounded up to score 1 point; a single low card is rounded down to zero. This is the simplest method but it doesn't work if a player does not have enough low cards for every counter.

==== Counting in threes with a 2-point deduction ====
The second method, popular in Vienna, was developed later: counting in threes with a 2-point deduction. (Note: Zählen in Dreierlagen mit 2-Punkte-Abzug) Cards are grouped in threes again, but the composition is irrelevant. Within each triplet the card values are added and then 2 points are deducted from the total. So, for example, a Queen, Cavalier and Ten are worth 4 + 3 + 1 – 2 = 6 points. Players try to ensure that any odd cards left over are low cards. Again, two low cards are worth 1 point and a single low card is worthless.

==== Counting in fractions ====
The third method is a new development and the most precise, but also the most complicated and least used: counting in fractions. (Note: Zählen in Bruchzahlen) Cards are given fractional values as follows: Trull cards and Kings – 4 1/3, Queens – 3 1/3, Cavaliers – 2 1/3, Jacks – 1 1/3 and low cards – 1/3 each. In this way individual cards can be counted. So a Queen, Cavalier and Ten are worth 3 1/3 + 2 1/3 + 1/3 = 6 points, producing the same result as the second method.

A variant of this method is used for French Tarot, where low cards are each worth half a point, and are combined with a counting card. The fractional values of each of the cards are as follows: Oudlers and Kings - 4 1/2, Queens - 3 1/2, Cavaliers - 2 1/2, Jacks - 1 1/2 and low cards - 1/2 each. The same method is used as above but counting only two cards. For example, a Queen (worth 3 1/2 points) and a low card (1/2 point) would be counted together to make 4.

== Variants ==
=== Fool as the excuse ===
==== Games with only three counting trumps ====
In these games, the Fool, the XXI, and the I are the only trumps that have a scoring value greater than one point. Despite being grouped with the trumps, the Fool cannot trump, it can only excuse the player from following suit. Out of the three cards, only the lowest trump is generally considered vulnerable. Many games do not envision the Fool to ever be lost but in some games, it must be surrendered if the player or side that held it fails to win any tricks to the opponent that won the trick in which the Fool was used. Grosstarock and French Tarot forbid the Fool from being played in the last trick or last few tricks, doing so forfeits the Fool to the trick's winner.

===== Games where no information is shared =====
These are basic games in which players share no information with each other. In the 21st century, they are confined to Grisons and Piedmont. In the past, they were played in France, Austria, and Lombardy. Scarto is a modern Piedmontese example.

===== Games with signalling =====
In these games, players exchange information through conventional codes and gestures. The majority of these games are for four players in fixed partnerships. In the present, they are played only in Grisons and Piedmont. Troccas is a Grisonian example.

===== Games with declarations =====
Also known as Classical Tarot, this family is historically well attested and was played in every country that has a tarot tradition going back to at least the first half of the 19th century. The game described by the Abbé de Marolles above in 1637 is a member. These games share the following features:

- Most games are for three players competing individually.
- Before play, players can declare their possession of certain cards for extra points. The most common declarations are: ten or more trumps, all three trump honours, four kings, and all the court cards of the same suit.
- There is a bonus for winning the last trick with a king or the lowest trump (ultimo). There may be a penalty for losing the last trick with these cards. In the 18th century, a new rule was added in which players can announce their intention to pull this off, which increased the bonus and penalty for this feat.

Despite being once the most widespread form of Tarot, Classical Tarot is now played only in Piedmont (Mitigati) and Denmark (Grosstarock).

===== Games with bidding =====
The concept of bidding first appeared in the game of Ombre. The game of Tarocc'Ombre was invented in Lombardy around the mid-18th century. These are the general features:

- The preferred game is for three players, however more can play. Regardless of the number of players, there are only two sides.
- Later versions used the 54 card deck when playing with less than five players.
- In the earliest versions, the winner of a low bid can "buy" one, two, or three cards not in his hand. The other players must exchange them for low cards and then are allied against the soloist. The highest bid is for 'no cards', in which the contractor attempts to win without exchanging cards. Later versions included bidding over the three-card talon, which was previously the dealer's privilege. There are also higher bids than 'no cards' such as bids to win all the tricks (slam).
- In games of five or more players, the contractor can also "call" a card not in his hand. This is usually a valuable card like a king or a high trump. Whoever holds that card is the contractor's secret partner for this hand. The contractor can also call a card in his own hand to deceive the other players into thinking that there is an opponent among them. In later versions, partner calling became allowed in games of four players.

In Piedmont, these games were known as Permesso, but they fell out of popularity in the 19th century. In German speaking countries, it was known as Taroc l'Hombre. Droggn, a descendant of Taroc l'Hombre, was played in the Stubai Valley until the 1980s. Although this branch of tarot (the Fool as excuse, without declarations, and card buying) died out, the concept of bidding and partner-calling left a lasting influence on other branches of tarot.

===== Games with declarations and bidding =====
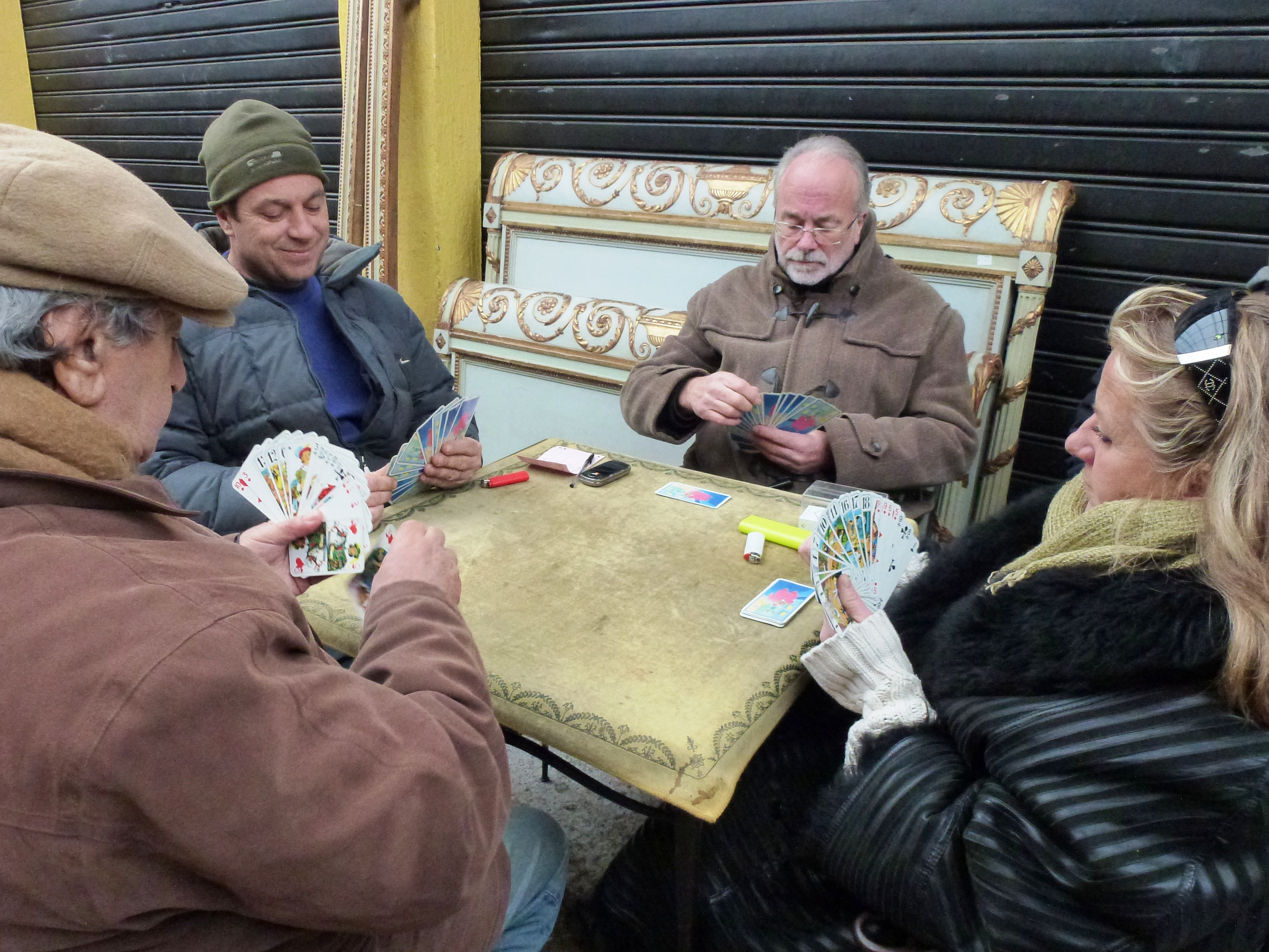
French Tarot being played.

There have been several attempts at combining Classical Tarot with contract tarot since the late 18th century. The modern version of French Tarot is the most successful. Classical Tarot, like the one described by the Abbé de Marolles, declined in popularity throughout most of France from the mid-17th century onward, surviving only in the eastern borders of that country. In the 19th century, the modern game evolved in Bourgogne-Franche-Comté. These are the general features:

- There are three to five players, with the four-player game being preferred. There are only two sides. It is always played with the full 78-card deck regardless of the number of players.
- From Classical Tarot, the declaration of ten or more trumps and the bonus of winning the last trick with the lowest trump have been carried over. Players can also announce a slam.
- Bidding is over the 6-card talon.
- In games with five players, the contractor can call a king. Whoever has this card is the contractor's secret partner.
- French Tarot is unique for its overtrumping requirement.
- The Fool is lost if played in the last trick like in Grosstarock. It is surrendered if the side that played it failed to win any tricks. If the player or side had won all the previous tricks, in the last trick it becomes the highest trump.

==== Games with more than three counting trumps ====
In these games located entirely within Italy, there are other trumps that are worth more than one point. All of them have a last trick bonus that can be won with any card.

- In Tarocchini, the game is played with the 62-card Tarocco Bolognese. The second highest trump is also worth five points. The four trumps above the Bégato are known as mori (formerly as papi) and are of equal rank. The game features signalling, declarations, and bonuses for assembling melds from the cards taken. The preferred game is for four players in fixed partnerships. Bidding is also used in one three-player version. Tarocchini has exerted a strong influence on the games played in Asti and formerly in Annecy.
- The game of Minchiate is played with a 97-card deck in which the trump suit has almost doubled in size. Half the trumps are counting cards while kings are the only plain suit cards that have value. The top five trumps are known as arie and the bottom five as papi. There are declarations and bonuses in creating melds like in Tarocchini. The preferred game was for four players in fixed partnerships. This game went extinct in the 1930s.
- Sicilian tarocchi is played by three or four players with the 63-card Tarocco Siciliano. The top five trumps are counting cards known as arie. Below the trump 1 is an unnumbered trump labelled Miseria, but it is not a counting card. The trump honours are worth 10 points while the rest of the arie are worth 5. Most of the games feature bidding over the talon and some have partner calling. The oldest versions also have bonuses for making melds from captured cards.

=== Fool as the highest trump ===
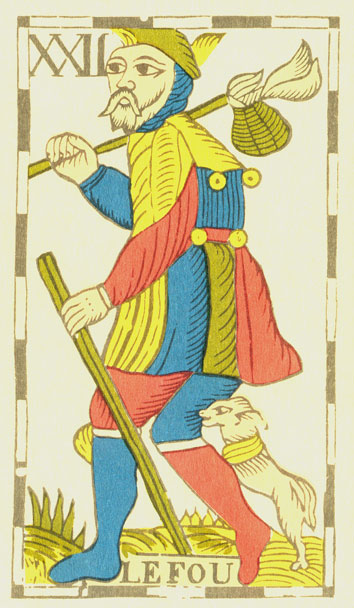
Le Fou (The Fool) from a Cartes de Suisses pack

The earliest evidence of the Fool treated as the highest trump comes from early 18th century tarot decks produced in Rouen and the Austrian Netherlands (Belgium). Their wrapping paper labels them as Cartes de Suisses (Swiss cards). It is not known how the Fool came to be the highest trump. In early Taroc l'Hombre and its descendants Droggn and French Tarot, the Fool is an excuse but becomes the highest trump in the final trick if the side that played it won all the previous tricks. This rule allows the holder of the Fool, a card that otherwise has no trick-taking power, to perform a slam. In the Swiss game of Troggu and the Badenese game of Dappen, this rule has been turned on its head. The Fool is normally the highest trump, but if it is the final trump in the player's possession, he can elect to play another card instead. When this happens, the Fool is treated as an excuse that is reserved for the last trick. Usually, players do not exercise this right as it is more advantageous in most situations to keep the Fool as a trump.

With the Fool as the highest trump, the XXI became vulnerable to being taken. This opened up a new objective of capturing or protecting the XXI. In Königrufen, even the Fool can be caught if it is played in the same trick with the other Trull cards.

==== Games with bidding ====
Troggu, also known as Tappä, and its relatives Dappen/Tappen and the Fribourg game of Tape belong to a poorly documented family of games thought to be of 18th century Swiss origin. Here are some common features of that family:

- The games can accommodate three to eight players with six and seven being preferable. This is unusually large for tarot games. Despite the large number of players, there are only two sides.
- Players bid over a large talon called the tapp. The contractor is known as the tappist or tapper. In some games, the tappist can call a high trump for a secret partner.
- The Fool is usually the highest trump but can act like an excuse as mentioned above.

==== Games with bidding and declarations ====
===== 54-card Tarock =====
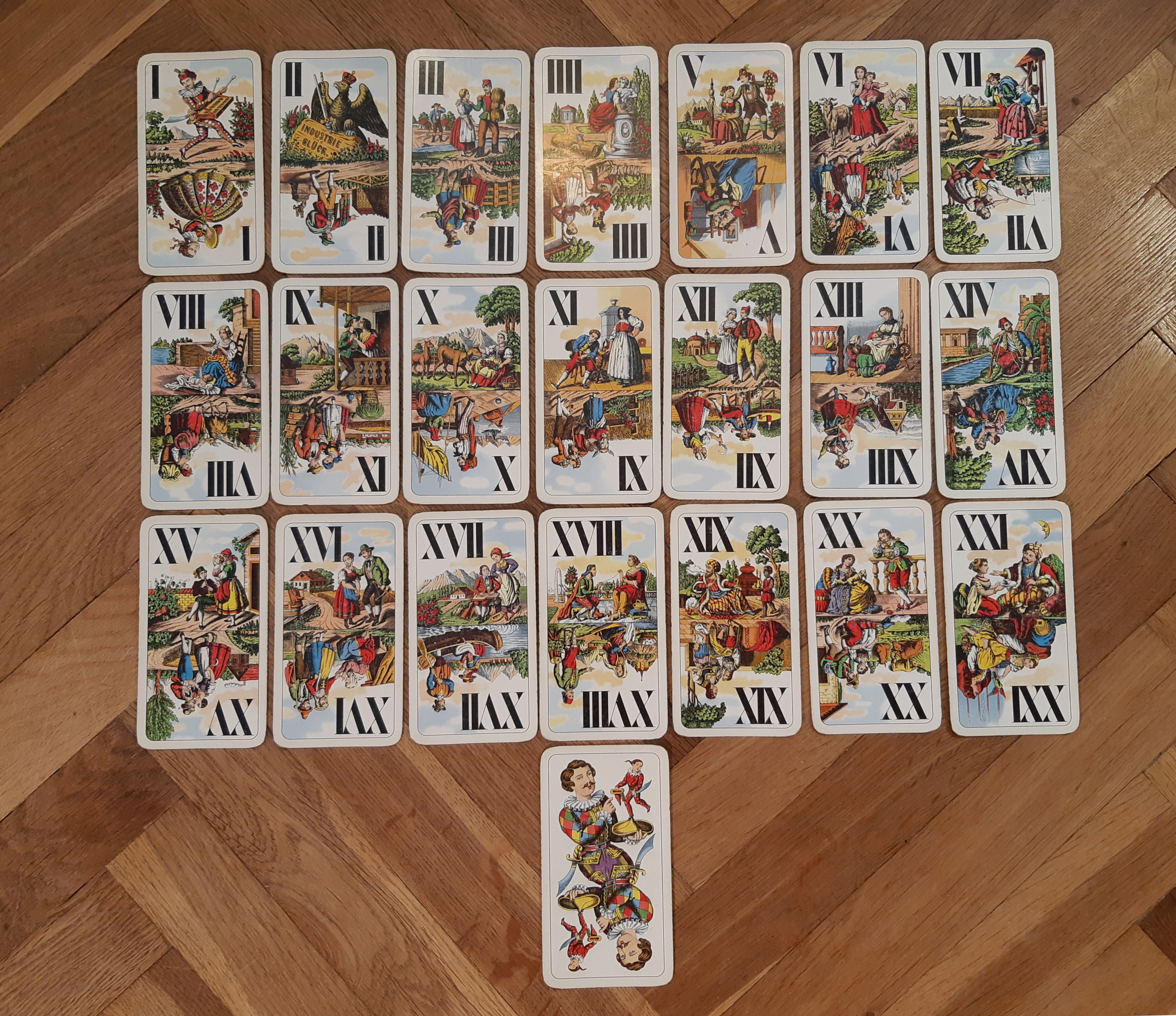
Industrie und Glück trumps

By the beginning of the 19th century, the game of Tapp Tarock appeared in which the Fool is always the highest trump. This game is thought to have originated in Further Austria. When these territories were ceded to the Grand Duchy of Baden in 1805, the games that developed there and the rest of the Habsburg monarchy began diverging. Its descendants are widely played in the Upper Rhine valley and its surrounding hills such as the Black Forest or the Vosges, and the countries within the boundaries of the former Austro-Hungarian Monarchy, for which even the name 'Tarockania' (Tarockanien) has been coined. They share the following features:

- There are no games with more than four players. There are only two sides.
- These games use the 54-card French suited Cego decks in Baden or Industrie und Glück decks in the former Austria-Hungary.
- Bidding is over the six-card tapp.
- From Grosstarock, declarations, announcements, and ultimo bonuses have been inherited.

Other three-handed games include Dreiertarock, Point Tarock, Illustrated Tarock, and Viennese Grosstarock. Two-player adaptations include Strohmandeln and Kosakeln.

The four-handed adaptations have since eclipsed the three-handed versions in popularity. In the early four-handed games, contractors could call any king or high trump for a secret partner as in Taroc l'Hombre. However, this eventually led to a split into two distinct games: calling a king (Königrufen) and calling trump 19 (Neunzehnerrufen). The former is dominant in Austria, Slovenia and Romania, while the latter in the Czech Republic and Slovakia. In Baden, the game of Cego developed from a three-handed variant called Dreierles. It is noted for having a large blind that can be used as a replacement hand.

===== 42-card Tarock =====
Tapp Tarock variants with 42 cards have been around for almost as long as the 54-card original. 42-card Industrie und Glück decks were produced until the late 20th century. Contemporary players purchase the 54-card version and remove the unnecessary cards. In these games, each suit has only one pip card, leaving the court cards extremely vulnerable. No plain suit can be led twice without getting trumped. Galician Tarok and Husarln are examples of three-handed games.

Its four-handed adaptation is Zwanzigerrufen (calling trump 20). Hungarian Tarokk is noted by Dummett to be the most difficult of all tarot games.

=== Ace-ten Tarock ===
German Tarok was created as result of the attempt to play Grosstarock with a normal 36-card German-suited pack. Instead of the dedicated trump suit, Hearts is chosen as the trump suit or at least as a preference suit. It spawned several descendants such as Württemberg Tarock or Tapp, Bavarian Tarock, Bauerntarock, Frog and Dobbm. They are ace–ten games that incorporate features of Tapp Tarock, but are not true Tarock games.

== In popular culture ==
In the denouement of the first volume of Dorothy Dunnett's Lymond Chronicles, The Game of Kings, the protagonist's life depends on his friend winning a prolonged game of tarocco.

== See also ==
- Hofämterspiel
- Mantegna Tarocchi
- Tarocchi fiorentini
