= Droggn =

Tarock card game for three players

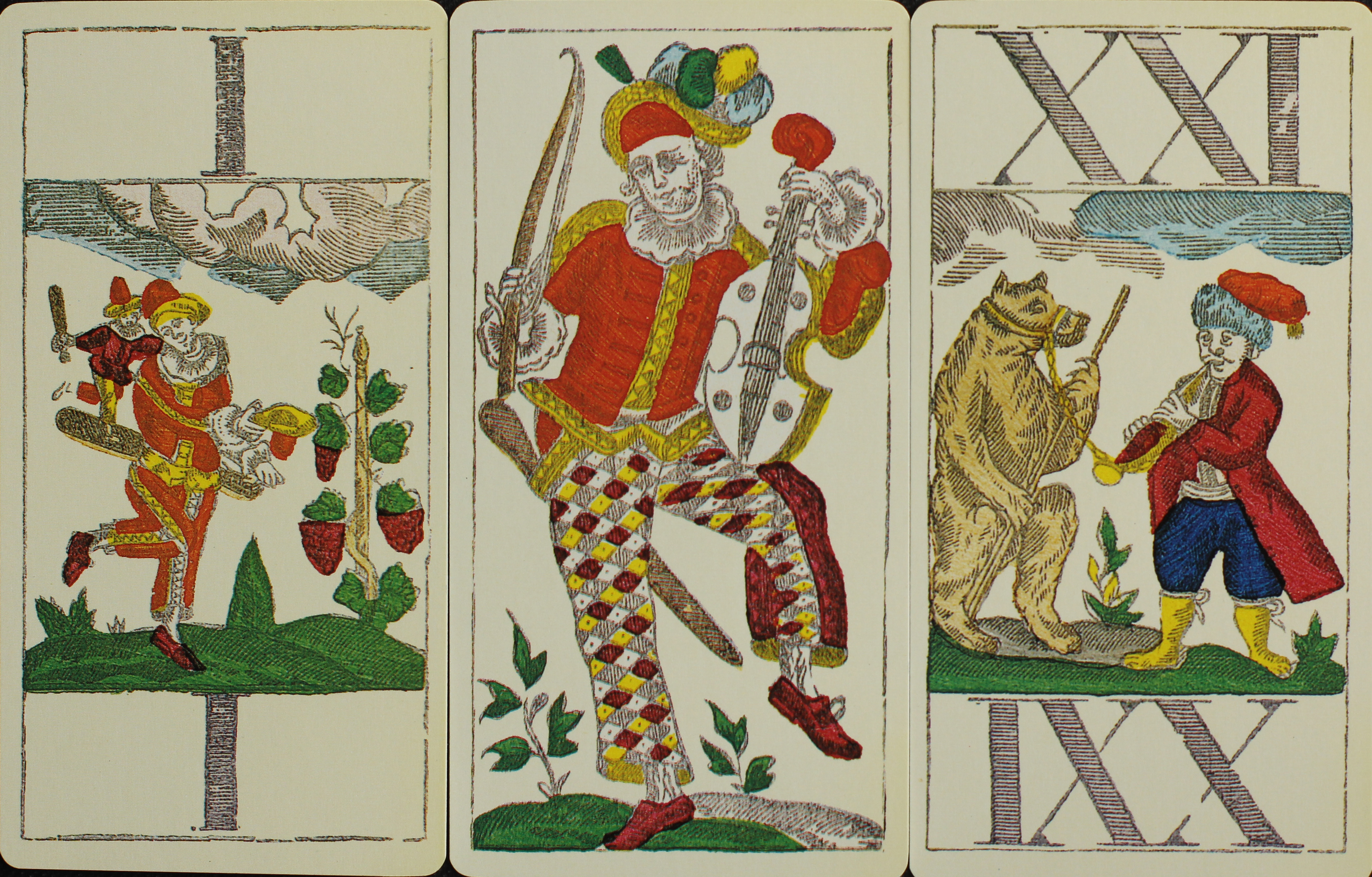
- The Trull (Bavarian Animal Tarot deck)
- Origin: Austria
- Type: Trick-taking
- Players: 3
- Cards: 66
- Deck: Stripped 78-card pack (e.g. Tarot Nouveau)
- Rank (high→low): Tarock: XXI-I, Gstieß ♣♠K Q R V 10-4 ♥♦ K Q R V A 2-7
- Play: Clockwise

Related games
- French Tarot • Tarok l'Hombre

Droggn, sometimes called French Tarock (German: Französisches Tarock) is an extinct card game of the Tarock family for three players that was played in the Stubai valley in Tyrol, Austria until the 1980s. Droggn is originally local dialect for "to play Tarock" (in standard German usually "tarockieren"), but it has become the proper name of this specific Tarock variant. An unusual feature of the game compared with other Tarock games is the use of a 66-card deck and that, until recently, there was no record in the literature of a 66-card game and no current manufacturers of such a deck. The structure of the game strongly indicates that it is descended from the later version of Tarok l'Hombre, a 78-card Tarock game popular in 19th-century Austria and Germany, but with the subsequent addition of two higher bids.

== History ==
During his research into The Game of Tarot, Michael Dummett learned that 66-card Tarock packs had been made during the 19th century in the Tyrol, but could find no record of any games played with 66 cards. Equally curious was that Piatnik had continued to manufacture 78-card packs into the 1980s, even though Austrian literature suggested that games played with more than 54 cards had died out in the early part of the 19th century. In 1992, card game researcher, Remigius Geiser, found out from Piatnik that, towards the end, 78-card packs had been sold exclusively in the Stubai valley near Innsbruck. In their follow-up work, Geiser and McLeod tracked down a number of players who had played the game of Droggn in the past and were able to demonstrate its rules. Some of the players called it French Tarock (Französisches Tarock).

Droggn players were divided over whether the game was introduced to the Tyrol by French soldiers during the Napoleonic Wars at the time of Andreas Hofer or was imported to the area from northern Italy. The game has a number of features in common with older forms of French Tarot and with Tarok l'Hombre, an Austrian descendant of the Italian game of Taroc 'Ombre. McLeod and Geiser conclude that "Stubai Droggn clearly belongs within the family of Tarok l'Hombre games which were current in the 19th century", but go on to acknowledge that there is "a strong possibility" that it was derived from a French game played by Napoleonic soldiers from eastern France.

== Aim ==
To win the 37 of the 74 card points available as the declarer or 38 as the defending team.

== Players ==
The game is played with three players. Four can play if the dealer "takes a holiday" (er feiert) i.e. when it is their turn players deal but do not participate in that hand.

== Cards ==
The game is played with a 66-card French-suited Tarock card deck. In more recent times, players used a 78-card variant of the Industrie und Glück pattern deck and stripped out the lowest 3 cards of each suit. These packs are no longer made, but alternatives include the French Tarot Nouveau pattern deck, or, more appropriately, the facsimile Tyrolean Tarock (Tiroler Tarock) pack depicting historical Tyrolean battle scenes or the Russian version of the Bavarian Animal Tarot pack (Russisches Tiertarock). The last two are produced by Piatnik.

=== Card pack ===
The pack thus comprises:

- 21 trumps numbered XXI to I.
- 11 cards per suit as follows:
  - ♠♣K D R B 10 9 8 7 6 5 4
  - ♥♦K D R B A 2 3 4 5 6 7
- The Gstieß (the Fool, L'Excuse or Sküs)

The court cards are the King (König), Queen (Dame), Rider (Reiter) and Jack or Valet (Bube) hence the lettering.

=== Card values ===
The values of the individual cards in card points (Augen) are as follows:

- Trull cards (Gstieß, XXI and I) - 5 points
- Honours or Kings - 5 points
- Queens - 4 points
- Riders - 3 points
- Valets - 2 points
- Other tarocks and pip cards - 1 points

=== Card names ===
Card names, which sometimes vary from other Austrian Tarock games, are as follows:

- Tarocks - Trümpfe ("trumps") or Addude (from the French atout)
- Trump XXI - Mond or der Große ("the big one")
- Trump I - Pagat or der Kleine / dar Kloane ("the littl' un")
- Sküs - Gstieß
- King - König or Honor ("honour")
- Queen - Dame / de Dam
- Rider - Reiter
- Valet - Bube / dar Bua
- Pip cards - leere / laare Karten
- Court cards - Mandlen
- Long suit - der Ritt
- Singleton - der Fuchs (normally a suit card in declarer's hand other than the King)

== Dealing ==
The dealer is chosen by cutting the pack; the highest card wins. Dealing and play are clockwise, unlike other Tarock games. After shuffling the cards, the dealer offers the pack to the player on his right, who cuts. The dealer then deals 3 packets of 7 cards to each player and places the last 3 cards face down on the table to form the talon.

== Bidding ==
Bidding is clockwise and each player gets one bid. The bids, in order starting with the lowest, are:

- Ansager - normal game announced by saying "bid" ("ich sage an / i sag on"). Declarer exchanges with the talon and 'buys' a nominated card from the player who holds it (see below). Game value = 20 game points.
- Solo - declarer exchanges with the talon only. Game value = 40 game points.
- Super - declarer does not use the talon or buy a card. Game value = 80 game points.
- Super Mord - declarer offers to take every trick and the talon is his also. Game value = 130 game points.

Players may "pass" (weiter). If everyone passes the cards are thrown in and re-dealt.

== Exchanging with the talon ==
For normal games and Solos, the declarer is allowed to exchange 3 cards with the talon, but may not discard the trull cards. The discards count as one of the declarer's tricks. A King must be discarded with a trump.

In normal contracts, the declarer is allowed to 'buy' a card by placing a card on the table and ask for a card of his choice. The player with that card must hand it over and take the discard.

== Bonuses and announcements ==
=== Bonuses ===
The following bonuses are permitted:

- Pagat ultimo - a player wins the last trick with the Pagat. Doubled if announced beforehand by placing the Pagat face-up by the talon at the start.
- Gstieß ultimo - ditto for the Gstieß but this is only permitted in a Super Mord.

=== Announcements ===
After the declarer has exchanged, discarded, bought a card and laid off a Pagat or Gstieß, the defenders in clockwise order, may now "stick" or "double". If they want to stick they say "good" (gut) or "pass" (komm) and the opportunity passes to the left. If they want to double the game or bonus value they may declare schiessen or a schwacher. This doubles the value for both defenders. The declarer may respond "good" or double the stakes again with a "retour" (Retour). The higher stakes apply to both game and bonus even they may go to different players.

== Playing ==
The declarer leads to the first trick (werfen) and play is then clockwise. Players must follow suit if possible or trump if unable. They do not have to head the trick. If they can neither follow nor trump they may discard. Tricks are won by the highest trump or, if no trumps are played, the highest card of the led suit. The trick winner leads to the next trick.

The Gstieß may be played at any time, but can neither capture nor be captured. Instead it is reclaimed by its holder and place with his tricks. If it is led, the next player may play any card. An exception to its lack of trick-taking powers is that, in a Super Mord, if it is declared in advance it may be played to the last trick whereupon it will win.

If the Pagat is captured during the game, it earns 5 points for its captor(s). If it wins the last trick it earns 20 points for Pagat Ultimo announced or 10 points if unannounced. If it fails to win the trick the points go to its captor(s).

Tricks are kept face down and the defenders share a common trick pile. Players may review their own tricks.

== Scoring ==
Scoring is effected by grouping the cards taken in tricks into threes, adding up the score for each triplet and deducting 2 points e.g. a King, Valet and Three of Hearts score 5 + 2 + 1 -2 = 6. A total of 37 card points is required to win the game.

The total game points won is the sum of the basic game value plus overshoot points (points above 37) plus any bonuses e.g. a declarer who plays Solo, takes the last trick unannounced with the Pagat and wins with 40 card points scores 40 + 3 + 10 = 53 game points. Winning a Super Mord automatically scores a total of 167 game points or 187 if a Gstieß Ultimo or Pagat Ultimo is announced and won. If a player wins every trick without having announced a Mord, it is a Matsch and he scores the game value plus 37 points.

== Bibliography ==
- Dummett, Michael (1980). The Game of Tarot. London: Duckworth.
- Dummett, Michael; McLeod, John (2004). A History of Games Played with the Tarot Pack. Vol. 1. Lewiston: Edwin Mellen.
- McLeod, John; Geiser, Remigius (May–June 1999). "Stubai Droggn and Dobbm - two living fossils of the Austrian card game landscape in". The Playing-Card. Vol. XXVII. Also found in Vol. XXVIII, No. 1, July/August 1999.
