= French Tarot =

Second most popular card game in the Western European country

- A trick-taking game of the European tarot card game family
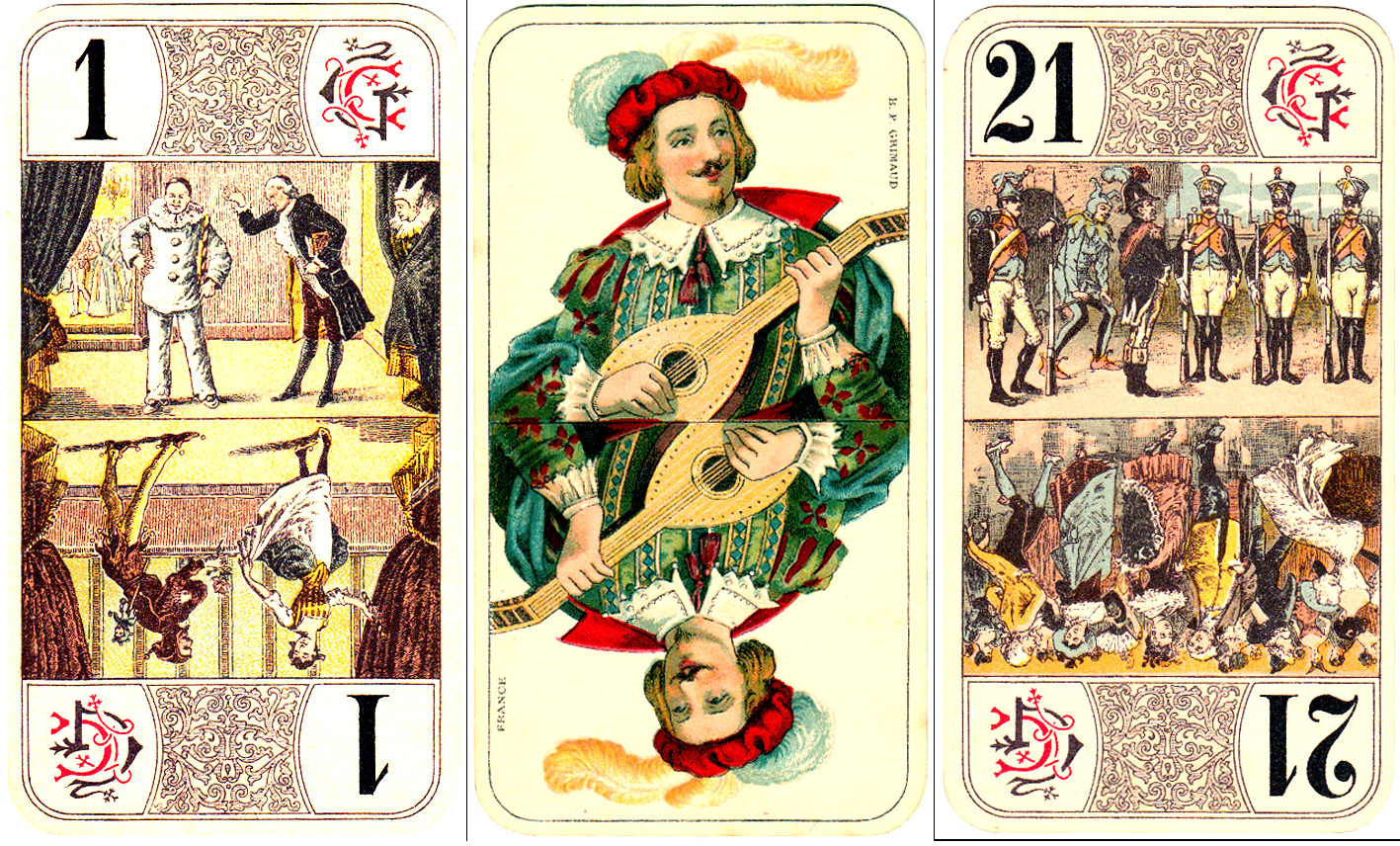
- The 3 oudlers of the French Tarot Nouveau, circa 1910
- Origin: French
- Alternative names: Tarot, Jeu de tarot
- Type: Trick-taking
- Players: 4 Variants for 3 or 5 players
- Skills: Card Counting, Tactics, Strategy
- Age range: 12 and up
- Cards: 78
- Deck: Tarot Nouveau
- Rank (high→low): Trump suit 21–1, Excuse; R D C V 10–1
- Play: Counter-clockwise
- Playing time: 15 minutes per hand
- Chance: Moderate

Related games
- Droggn

The game of French Tarot is a trick-taking strategy tarot card game played by three to five players using a traditional 78-card tarot deck. The game is played in France and also in French-speaking Canada. It should not be confused with divinatory tarot, which refers to the use of tarot for cartomancy.

== Background ==
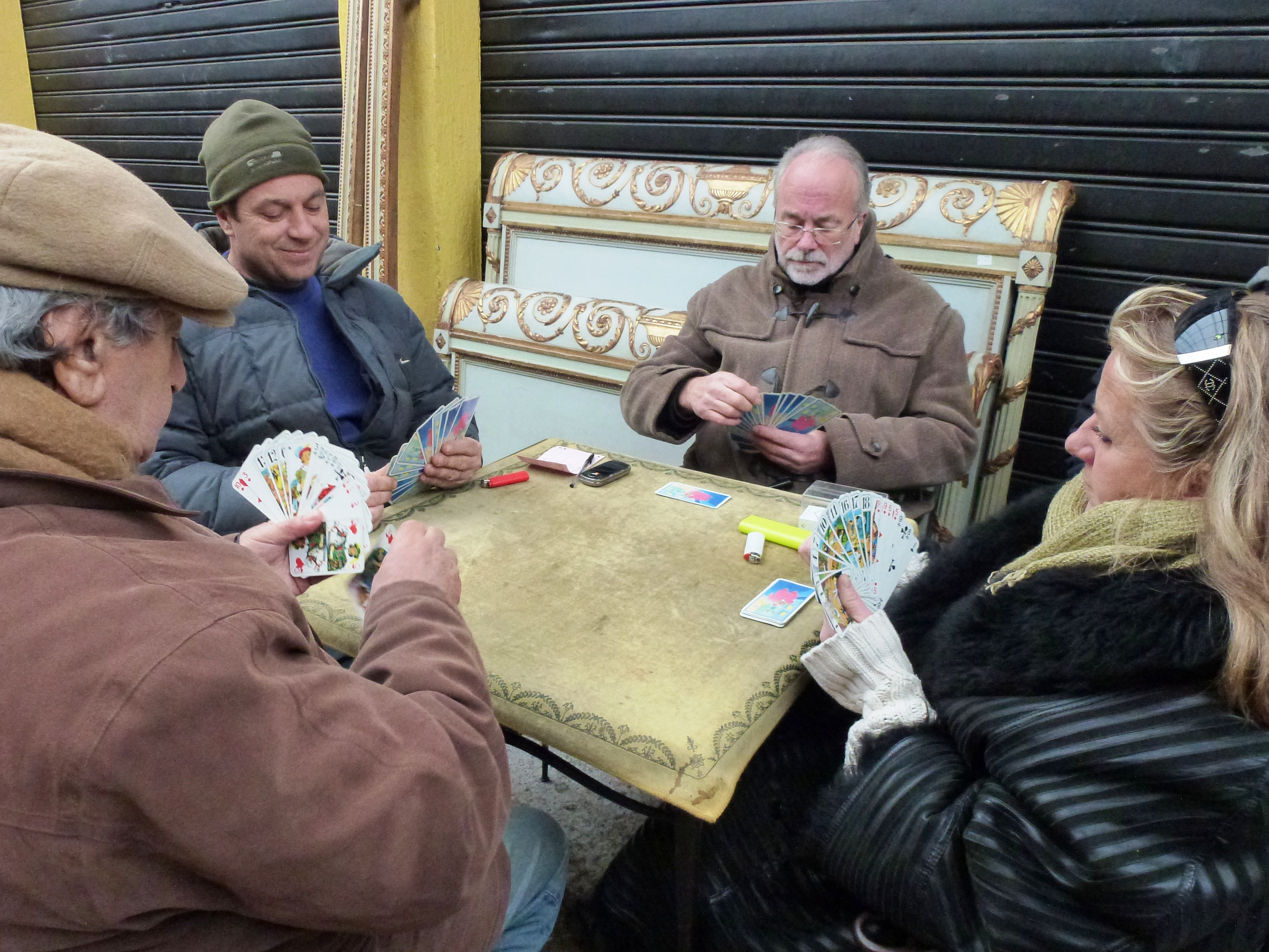
French Tarot players at the Saint-Ouen flea market

France was one of the first two countries outside of Italy to start playing tarot, the other being Switzerland. While various types of tarot games were played in France since the 16th century, the dominant form now popular is the 19th-century rule set from Bourgogne-Franche-Comté. Historically, tarot games in France were played with the Italian-suited Tarot of Marseilles which had Renaissance allegorical images on the atouts while lacking reversible court cards and trumps and corner indices. For ease of play, the late 19th century French-suited "Tarot Nouveau" or "Bourgeois Tarot" supplanted the Marseilles Tarot with depictions of typical fin de siècle genre scenes of French life and leisure.

In English, the game is referred to as French Tarot or sometimes as French tarot, however, the latter usually refers to tarot cards of French origin or to cartomantic tarot and not to the game. The name French Tarot is used in English to differentiate the card game from other uses of the tarot deck that are more familiar in the Americas and English-speaking countries, particularly the decks used for cartomancy and other divinatory purposes, and also to distinguish it from other card games played with a tarot deck. The unique feature that distinguishes French Tarot from other forms of tarot games is the overtrumping rule. In France it is just known as jeu de Tarot.

== History ==
Cards appeared in Europe towards the end of the 14th century and may have been introduced first through Italy or Catalonia. Tarot cards are first mentioned in the mid-15th century in Italy. Initially called trionfi, meaning "triumph", whence the name "trump" in English, the Italians later called them tarocchi as the idea of trumps spread to other card games. Both the Italian word tarocchi and the French word tarot occur from the early 16th century onwards, although it is unclear whether one was derived from the other. (Note: On page 6, Depaulis gives 1516 in Ferrara as the first occurrence. Since then, the same author has discovered an earlier example of the word Tarot in 1505 in Avignon.)

Tarot was introduced into France in the early 16th century as a result of the First and Second Italian Wars (1494–1522) and is widely recorded in French literature of that century, the earliest reference being that by Rabelais in Gargantua in 1534. By 1622 it had become more popular in France than chess and the earliest account appeared around 1637 in Nevers. This describes a three-player, 78-card game played with an Italian-suited pack with the Fool acting as an Excuse and the suits ranking in their 'original' order i.e. with numeral cards in the suits of Cups and Coins ranking from Ace (high) to Ten (low). This ranking is retained in all Tarot games today except in France and Sicily. In France, Tarot remained in vogue until 1650, but then its popularity steadily waned to the point where, in 18th century France, it was barely played outside the Provence region. (Note: In 1781, Antoine Court de Gébelin wrote in his Monde primitif analysé et comparé avec le monde moderne that Tarot was "a game unknown it is true, in Paris, but very well known in Italy, in Germany, and even in Provence".)

The game experienced a revival in the course of the late 18th and 19th centuries. The original Italian-suited cards typified by the Tarot de Marseille came to be viewed as Italian and were replaced by French designs, notably the Tarot Nouveau.

There is some evidence that Napoleon's troops introduced Tarot, in the form of Droggn – a Tarot game with similarities to old French Tarot – into Austrian Tyrol. It is also recorded that French soldiers were issued with Tarot packs during the Franco-Prussian War (1870), First World War (1914–18) and Algerian War (1954–62), leading in each case to the spread of le jeu de Tarot throughout France according to Dummett and Berloquin. In 1973, the French Tarot Federation (Fédération Française de Tarot) was formed and, by the late 20th century, Tarot had become the second-most popular card game in France, only trailing Belote. Part of the reason why French Tarot persisted is the fact that the rules have been very consistent wherever the game is played. However, details of play outside of officially sanctioned tournaments may vary from circle to circle so that the known rules and terminologies are more typical than definitive.

In the late 18th century in France, Tarot cards first became associated with fortune telling, a practice that eventually spread to much of the Western world. However, the cards preferred for divination are the older Italian-suited packs or bespoke modern designs, which have occultic symbology, rather than the packs with scenes of everyday life like the French Tarot Nouveau, German Cego and Austro-Hungarian Industrie und Glück packs.

== Deck ==
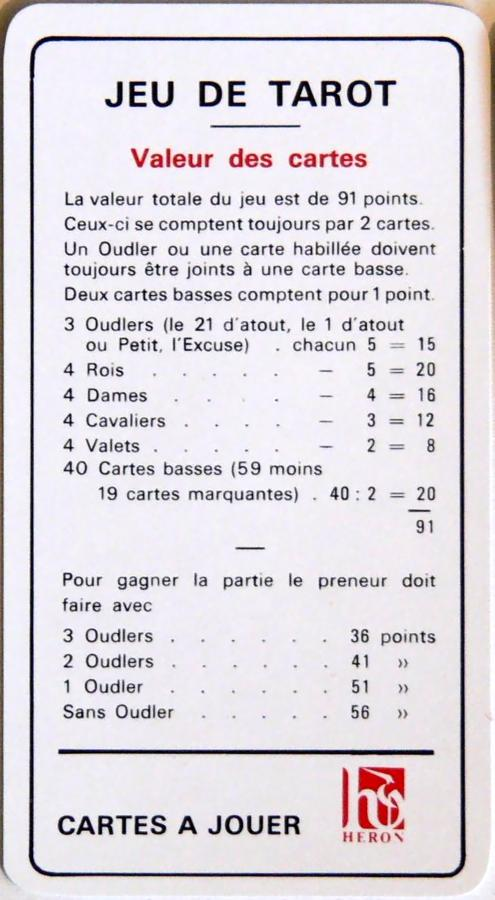
Card values in French Tarot

The game is played using a 78-card tarot deck. This deck is composed of:

- 21 numbered trump cards (atouts), and 1 unnumbered trump card: the "Excuse" or "Fool" (L'excuse or Fou)
  - 3 of these trumps, known as oudlers, have particular importance: the 1 of trumps, the 21 of trumps and the "Excuse" (or Fool). These determine the contract the taker commits to in that particular game.
- 4 suits of 14 cards each:
  - numbered "pip cards" (aka 'fillers') from 1 to 10 have no true value, except when taking its "fold" or add .5 point at counting (the "Ace" has always the lowest value and so it is marked with number 1 instead of the "A" common in 52-card decks),
  - four "face cards"; the Valet (Jack), Cavalier (Knight; not seen in 52-card decks), Dame (Queen) and Roi (King) are respectively worth 2, 3, 4 and 5 points at end of match counting.

=== Rank of cards ===
Three cards known as oudlers (honours) are of particular importance in the game: the 1 of trumps (le petit or "Little one"), the 21 of trumps (le monde or "The World", a holdover from the name of this card in the Tarot of Marseilles), and the Excuse (the Fool). These cards, when captured by the high bidder, lower the point threshold needed to fulfil the contract. In colloquial French, oudlers are often referred to as bouts (ends).

The ranking of the hearts, clubs, diamonds and spades from the top is: King, Queen, Knight, Jack, 10, 9, 8, 7, 6, 5, 4, 3, 2, 1 (Ace).

=== Excuse ===
The only card with a special effect is the "Fool", L'Excuse. The Excuse may be played on any trick; it "excuses" the player from following suit. However, it normally doesn't win the trick. The card also normally remains the property of the person who played it, not the winner of that trick; to compensate for this in the scoring count, the owner of the Excuse should instead give the winner of the trick a half-point card (a trump other than an oudler, or a suited number card; see Scoring) from the tricks the Excuse holder has already taken.

Two common exceptions to the above procedure occur when the Excuse is played to the last trick, and what happens depends on whether the side playing the Fool has taken all the previous tricks (see Chelem/Slam below). If the side has taken all previous tricks, the card takes the last trick; if not, it changes hands to the other side, even if the trick is won by a partner or fellow defender of the person playing it.

== Rules ==
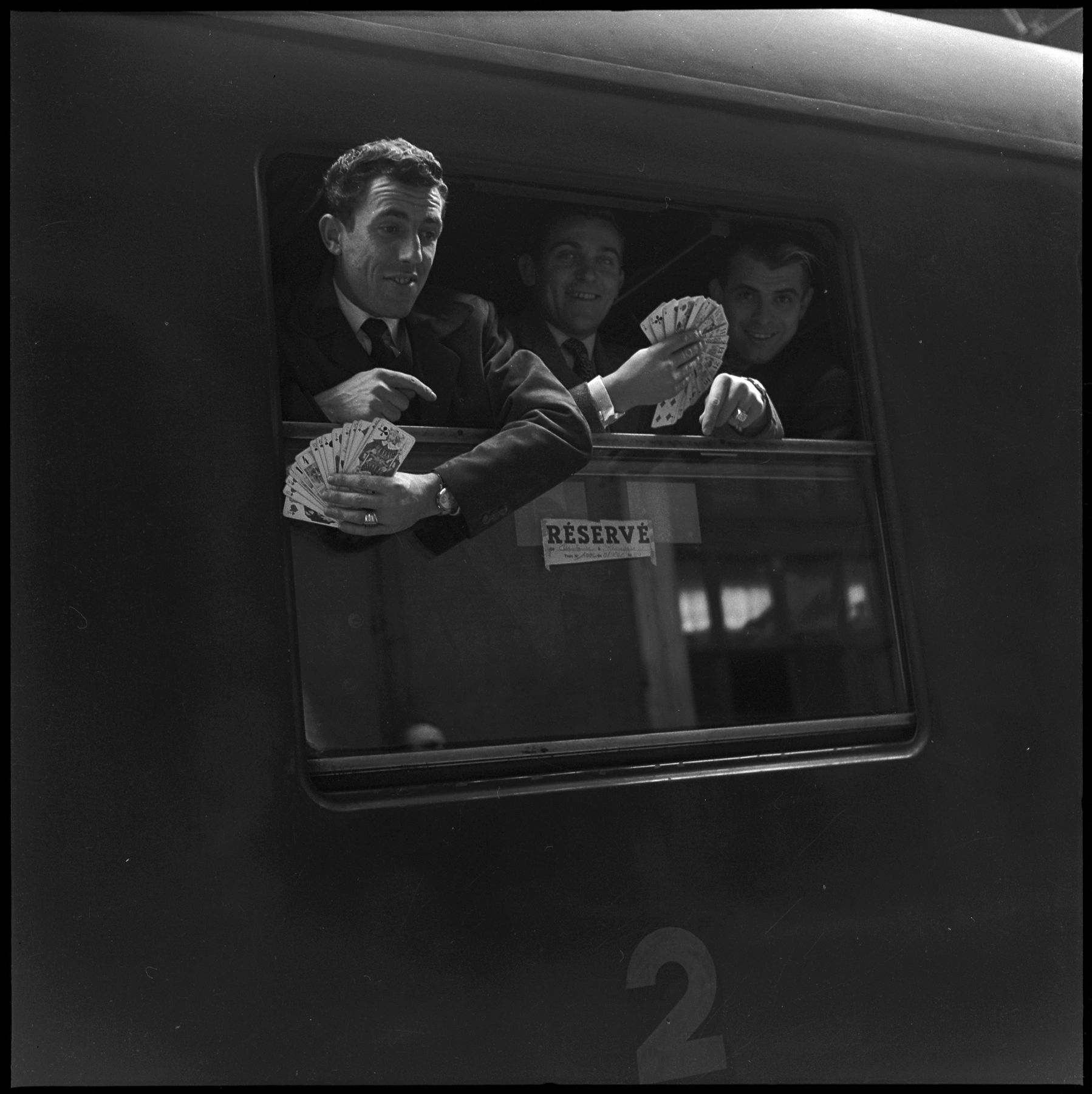
Pierre Cahuzac and Ernest Schultz playing French Tarot.

For 3 or 4 players (5 with a simple variation). The 4-player variant is usually considered the most challenging and is the one played in competitions. The following rules are for 4 players.

=== Dealing ===
Players draw for the first deal; the person with the lowest-value card deals first, with suits ordered spades > hearts > diamonds > clubs as a tiebreaker. All trumps rank higher than any suited card; anyone who draws the Fool must redraw. From this point, the deal will pass to the right (anticlockwise) for each subsequent deal.

The player at the left of the dealer cuts the deck. The dealer then deals out the entire deck, anticlockwise, starting with first hand. Each player is dealt their cards in packets of three consecutive cards at a time (they will each receive 6 such packets for a total of 18 cards). In addition, a chien (lit. "dog", alt. "kitty", "talon" or "nest") of 6 cards is dealt one card at a time into the centre of the table, while dealing to the other players. A card may be dealt to the dog at any time, but the dealer may not:

- deal the dog two consecutive cards,
- deal the dog a card from the middle of a player's packet, or
- deal the first or last card of the deck to the dog.

A common valid dealing order is player A → player B → dog → player C → dealer, but this is just one permutation and the dealer is free to choose the sequence while following the above rules.

A maldonne (misdeal) occurs when the dealer makes mistakes in the dealing; if this happens, the hand is redealt, either by the same dealer or the next in rotation. Players inspect, sort and evaluate their hands, and then move on to the bidding round.

=== Annulment ===
Before the bidding phase, if one player has a "Petit sec" (only one trump in hand, and it is the Petit, and does not have the Fool), then the player has to announce it and the hand is redealt. If it is discovered later in the game that a player had a "Petit sec", then it is also annulled and redealt by the following dealer.

=== Bidding ===
The players look at the cards they have been dealt, and an auction begins, beginning with first hand and rotating counterclockwise. By bidding, a player states their confidence that they will be able to meet a set contract (see below) and sets the terms by which they will try to do so. If a player does not wish to bid, they may "pass" but may not bid after having passed previously. One may only bid higher than the previous bidders. The preneur ("taker", sometimes called declarer as in Bridge) is the one who wins this auction and who must subsequently try to achieve the contract while the other players are the defenders and attempt to prevent the taker from doing so.

The level of bid is based on the strength of a player's hand, usually estimated by counting the points within it. See evaluating one's hand below for a method to determine the points within one's hand.

The bids are, in increasing importance:

- Prise ("take") or petite ("small"): if this is the winning bid the taker adds the "dog" to their hand, then confidentially sets aside a same number of cards of their choice, to bring their hand back to normal size before play begins. The discarded cards form the beginning of the taker's score pile (the tricks pile). The name of this stack evolves from "le chien" to "l'écart" ("the aside").
- Pousse ("push"): same actions and scoring as a prise, but outranks the prise and generally indicates a stronger hand value. This bid is not in the official rules, and is a holdover from an older bidding system (see below).
- Garde ("guard"): the same actions as prise, but the taker wins or loses double the usual stake.
- Garde sans ("guard without" the dog): the dog goes directly into the taker's score pile, and no-one gets to see it until the end of the hand. The score is counted normally against the target number, but it is worth double the garde score (4x the base hand score) to whomever wins the hand.
- Garde contre ("guard against" the dog): the dog goes directly into the opposing score pile, without being shown until the end of the hand. The score is counted normally against the target number, but it is worth triple the garde score (6x the base hand score) to whomever wins the hand.

If no one bids, the hand is void and the deal passes to the right.

On a prise, pousse or garde, the taker may not set aside a king or a trump, except that if the player cannot discard anything else, they may discard a non-oudler trump. In this case, the taker has to display which trumps they set aside. An oudler may never be set aside.

In earlier rules, still played outside of competitions, in place of the prise and simple garde, there were two bids, in increasing importance: the petite (small) and the pousse (push). The prise is still sometimes known as petite. There are also some players who play without the prise contract, with garde as the minimum allowable bid.

=== Main phase ===
First hand leads the first trick, and play proceeds counterclockwise, with every player playing a card to the trick. Tricks are evaluated in a similar fashion as other trick-taking games with a trump suit; the highest trump, if played, takes the trick, and if trump is not played, the highest-value card of the led suit takes the trick. Every subsequent trick is led by the player who took the last trick. The leader of a trick can play any card they like.

Once the leader of a trick has played a card, everyone else must follow suit. If the first card played in a trick is the Fool, the suit which must be followed is determined by the next card. A player who cannot follow suit must play a trump card if able, and additionally, the player is compelled to overtrump if able (The "Petit" or 1 is valued lowest, and the "Monde" or 21 is valued highest). If a player must trump but cannot overtrump, they can play any trump. A player who cannot follow suit or trump may play any card to the trick, however it cannot win the trick.

If a trump is led to the trick, the others must play a trump, and each trump must exceed the rank of all trump previously played in the trick if possible. If this is not possible, a lower-ranked trump, or any card if the player has no trumps, can be played.

The Fool (L'Excuse) may be played to any trick, instead of following suit or trumping. The Fool never wins the trick, unless it is played to the last trick and the side playing it has taken every previous trick. However, it never changes sides, unless played to the last trick and the side playing it has not won every trick. After playing the Fool to a trick, the player who played it simply takes the Fool back, places it into their scoring pile and gives the side who took the trick an "ordinary" card (worth a half-point; see scoring below) from their scoring pile.

The official FFT tournament rules do not cover the public or private nature of the contents of scoring piles during play. Generally in trick-taking games, the contents of players' scoring piles are not public information during play of the hand, except in cases where a revoke is suspected (a player not following suit, trumping or overtrumping when it was possible for them to do so). A player is neither required to divulge the contents of the score pile nor permitted to look through it except as necessary to find a half-point card to replace the Fool.

=== Scoring ===
When the last trick has been played, the round ends. The taker counts the number of oudlers and the point value of all cards in the taker's scoring pile. Alternatively, if the taker has taken the majority of tricks, the defenders can pool their scoring piles and count their oudlers and points; the taker has all remaining points.

==== Value of the cards ====
Cards for scoring purposes are divided into two groups: "counters" (face cards and oudlers) and "ordinary" cards or cartes basses (any suited pip card, and any trump except the 1 and 21). Cards are paired, with each counter matched to an ordinary card, and remaining ordinary cards are also paired. The values of pairs are then counted and summed:

- 1 King or oudler + 1 ordinary card: 5 points
- 1 Queen + 1 ordinary card: 4 points
- 1 Knight + 1 ordinary card: 3 points
- 1 Jack + 1 ordinary card: 2 points
- 2 ordinary cards: 1 point

Each card thus has an individual value; the pairing simply makes it easier to count points. If a card cannot be paired, because there are an odd number in the scoring pile (common with three or five players) or more counters than ordinary cards:

- Kings and oudlers are worth 4 1/2 points each;
- Queens are worth 3 1/2;
- Knights are worth 2 1/2;
- Jacks are worth 1 1/2;
- All other cards are worth 1/2 point.

==== Winning ====
The number of points the taker needs depends on how many of the oudlers (Excuse, Petit, 21 of trumps) are among the tricks won by the taker.

- With 3 oudlers the taker needs at least 36 card points to win;
- With 2 oudlers the taker needs at least 41 card points to win;
- With 1 oudler the taker needs at least 51 card points to win;
- With none the taker needs at least 56 card points to win.

There are 91 points to be taken in a round, so if the taker has:

- 3 oudlers, the defenders need at least 55 1/2 card points to win;
- 2 oudlers, the defenders need at least 50 1/2 card points to win;
- 1 oudler, the defenders need at least 40 1/2 card points to win;
- no oudler, the defenders need at least 35 1/2 card points to win.

==== Updating the scorecard ====
Scoring in Tarot is "zero-sum"; when one player gains points, one or more other players lose an equal number. To calculate the basic "hand score" that is to be added or deducted, the scorer starts with a basic score of 25 points, then adds the absolute (non-negative) difference between the points earned by the taker and the threshold, and, if any, the Petit au bout bonus. This quantity is multiplied by the appropriate multiplier for the taker's bid level (see Bidding), and then two additional bonuses may be added if they apply; the poignée or "handful" bonus, and the chelem or slam bonus (see below for descriptions of bonuses). Thus, calculation of the hand score is expressed by the formula

s = (25 + E + P) × M + H + S

where:

- E = Extra Points (points above the target score, or below if the target score is not hit)
- P = Petit au bout bonus (see below)
- M = Multiplier (1, 2, 4, or 6 depending on the taker's bid level)
- H = Handful bonus (see below)
- S = Slam bonus (see below)

If the taker beats the target score, this hand score is deducted from the score of each defender. If the taker misses the target score, this score is added to the score of each defender. The opposite of the sum of the defenders' gain or loss is then added to or deducted from the taker's score to balance the scores; with four players, the taker will gain or lose three times the hand score depending on whether the taker made or missed the contract. The sum of all scores for each hand, and thus the sum of the running totals after each hand, should be zero.

For example, a Garde Sans bid with a simple handful won by player A by a margin of 12 points gives the following hand score: ((25 + 12 + 0) × 4) + 20 + 0 = 168 points. This score is deducted from the scores of all defenders and the sum of this loss is added to the taker's score, hence the scorecard:

- A +504
- B −168
- C −168
- D −168

Some players prefer to round the scores to the nearest 10 points after each game, however care must be taken as the scores should still sum to zero. Rounding each of the above scores independently yields 500 − 170 − 170 − 170 = −10. If rounding is to be done, the defenders' scores should be rounded and the taker's score adjusted accordingly. Doing so in the above example would make the taker's score 510, thus it balances out.

This is not the only scoring method; the alternative is seen below.

==== Soft shuffling ====
After each round, the cards are gathered, cut by the previous dealer, and dealt by the person to the right of the previous dealer. The cards are not commonly shuffled other than the "soft shuffling" that occurs as a natural result of playing the cards. By not shuffling, groups of desirable cards are kept together such that one person generally has a favorable enough hand to open the bidding. With shuffling between deals it is unlikely that any one player will be willing to bid on the hand dealt; this leads to multiple redeals before a hand is actually played.

=== Bonuses ===
==== Misère ====
If a player's hand contains no trumps or no court cards (roi, dame, cavalier, valet), the player can declare Misère, which gives the declarer 30 points and subtracts 10 from the other players scores. This bonus is a common house rule and is not considered "official" by the Fédération Française de Tarot for tournament purposes.

==== Poignée ====
If a player has 10 or more trumps in their hand, they can declare a single (10+), double (13+), or triple (15+) "handful" (poignée), right before playing their first card. A single handful adds 20 to the scoring. Doubles and triples add 40 and 60, respectively. The bonus is always added to the hand score, so if a player thinks that his or her side may not win, they might not want to declare a handful, so as not to give the other side points. The declaring player must show at least the number of trump cards for the level of the bonus declared. The Fool counts as a trump for the purposes of declaring handfuls, but if shown it gives information to other players as it usually means that the declaring player has no additional trumps. This bonus is not multiplied according to the contract.

==== Petit au bout ====
When the last trick contains the Petit (1 of trump), 10 points is added to or deducted from the hand score before multiplying. Whether it is added or subtracted depends on which would most benefit the side taking the trick with the Petit au bout (One at the End). Usually, when one side (taker or defenders) makes Petit au bout but the other side was successful in either making or breaking contract, the bonus is subtracted; when one side is successful in the contract and also makes Petit au bout, the bonus is added. If the side attempting the Petit au bout wins all the tricks, the player gets the petit au bout bonus if the Petit was played at the second to last trick (and won the trick) and the Fool was played at the last trick. This bonus is multiplied according to the contract; if the contract is Guard Without, the gain or loss for a single hand score is adjusted by 40 points one way or the other.

==== Chelem ====
To Slam (in French, chelem) is to take every trick in the round. "Announced" Slam (made while bidding in the auction) gains 400 points if made. It grants the taker the right (and obligation) to start the first trick. Otherwise, a non-announced Slam made by either the taker or the defenders gains 200 points. Failure to fulfill a pre-declared Slam costs the announcer 200 points. This bonus is not multiplied according to the contract.

==== Petit Slam ====
"Petit Slam" is a bid to take every trick but three. It is, like the misère, unofficial. An unannounced Petit Slam is worth 150 points, while an announced slam can gain the taker 300 points or lose them 150 if they make or miss.

== Variants ==
=== Petit imprenable ===
In Petit imprenable ("untouchable Petit"), a player who has no trump except the Petit can still play, but the Petit is played like the Fool; if it does not take the trick, it is given back to its owner in exchange for a half-point card.

=== Petit sec ===
In Petit sec ("dry Petit"), a player who has the Petit but no other trump nor the Fool must announce this; the hand is voided and this round will be redealt by the next dealer. Common house rules also allow a player to declare a maldonne if their hand has no trumps, or fewer than a given number of combined trumps and face cards.

=== Three-player variant ===
The dog consists of six cards, each hand of 24 cards, dealt in packets of four. 13 trumps are needed for a single handful, 15 for a double handful, 18 for a triple.

=== Five-player variant ===
The dog consists of three cards, each hand of 15 cards, dealt in packets of three. 8 trumps are needed for a single handful, 10 for a double, 13 for a triple. Before calling the dog and scoring the three cards, the taker calls the King of any suit. Whoever has that King becomes the taker's partner, and plays with the taker against the other players. If the taker has all four kings, a queen must be called. If the taker has all four kings and all four queens, a knight must be called. A taker with all kings, queens and knights must play alone.

In the Austrian tarot game of Königrufen, this king-calling mechanism is used so that four-player play two against two.

The King is called before anything is done with the dog; therefore, the taker may call a King that is in the dog. In this case, the taker plays alone; having effectively called him- or herself as partner if the dog's cards are to be integrated into the hand, and in any case no other player has that King in hand.

In scoring, the taker's partner gets one "hand score" added to or deducted if the taker makes or misses the contract. So, if taker beats the target score, each defender loses the hand score, the partner gains the hand score, and the taker gets twice the hand score. If the taker misses, the gains and losses are reversed.

=== Higher Garde Contre ===
A popular variant is setting the multiplier for the Garde Contre to 8 instead of 6.

=== Parole bid ===
In some social games, and in order to avoid abandoned deals and the redistribution of cards, it is possible to have a bid of Parole: the player does not commit to a contract but reserves judgment until a second round of bidding. Depending on the variants, this allows you to freely choose a bid from Prise to Garde Contre, or just a Prise. This variant is not accepted in tournaments.

=== Pousse contract ===
In some regions, there is a Pousse between the Petite and the Garde. Instead of having multipliers, the contracts are then worth fixed amounts of 10, 20, 40, 80 or 160 points. In this case, the single Prise is called the Petite (the player says in this case "Petite"). In this variant the player does not say "I" in the other bids, simply saying "garde" or "pousse" for example. When a player has made a bid and another player outbids, the first player can in turn outbid or leave i.e. it is bidding with immediate hold.

== Strategy ==
Special hands
Term	English	Definition
Coupe franche	void	Having no card in a particular suit
Singlette	singleton	Having one card in a particular suit
Demi-coupe	singleton	Having one card in a particular suit
Fausse coupe	singleton	Having one card in a particular suit
Filante	Being long in a suit	Having many cards in a particular suit.
Longue	Being long in a suit	Having many cards in a particular suit.
Allonge	Being long in a suit	Having many cards in a particular suit.

=== Evaluating one's hand ===
As a guide to bidding, a player can reckon points for various features of the cards held, judging the bid according to the total number of points.

Feature			Pts
The oudlers	the 21		12
The oudlers	the fool		8
The oudlers	the petit	with 1-3 trumps	0
The oudlers	the petit	with 4 trumps	5
The oudlers	the petit	with 5 trumps	7
The oudlers	the petit	with 6+ trumps	9
Other trumps	for each trump (4+)		2
Other trumps	for each trump 16 to 20		2
Other trumps	for each trump 16 to 21 in a sequence, e.g. 20,21 = 2 points or 16,17,18 = 3 points		1
The major suited cards	king and queen of the same suit		10
The major suited cards	a king without queen		6
The major suited cards	a queen without king		3
The major suited cards	a knight		2
The major suited cards	a jack		1
The suits	5 cards of the same suit		5
The suits	6 cards of the same suit		7
The suits	7+ cards of the same suit		9
For garde sans or garde contre	no card of a suit		6
For garde sans or garde contre	only one card of a suit		3

Each range of point totals suggests a different bid:

less than 40 points: Passe (no bid)
40 to 55 points: Prise
56 to 70 points: Garde
71 to 80 points: Garde Sans
80+ points: Garde Contre

=== Getting the Petit ===
It is essential to try to get the Petit if one can. In a 5-player game, if the taker has the 21 of trump, it should always be played so the partner can secure the Petit if held. A taker with many trumps may embark on a chasse au petit (Petit hunt), trying to play trumps so that the Petit owner has no choice but to give it away.

=== Observation ===
Every player should know which suits have been played, and which are still to be played. It is useful to count how many trumps, and what kings, have been played.

=== Statistics ===
==== Distribution of suits ====
The following table shows the maximum number of suits and trumps for a Defender for 4 players.

Number of cards of a suit the Taker doesn't have
	4	5	6	7	8	9	10	11	12	13	14	15	16
2	66.7%	37.0%	12.4%										
3	29.6%	49.4%	57.6%	48.0%	25.6%	8.5%							
4	3.7%	12.3%	24.7%	38.4%	48.0%	48.0%	37.3%	19.5%	6.5%				
5		1.2%	4.9%	11.5%	20.5%	30.7%	39.7%	43.8%	40.7%	30.5%	15.8%	5.3%	
6			0.4%	1.9%	5.1%	10.2%	17.1%	25.0%	32.9%	38.4%	39.5%	35.2%	25.8%
7				0.1%	1.7%	2.2%	4.9%	8.9%	14.3%	20.7%	27.3%	33.1%	36.4%
8						0.3%	0.9%	2.2%	4.5%	7.7%	12.2%	17.1%	22.8%
9							0.1%	0.4%	1.0%	2.2%	4.0%	6.6%	10.2%
10									0.1%	0.4%	1.0%	2.0%	3.6%
11										0.1%	0.2%	0.5%	1.0%
12												0.1%	0.2%

Example: Suppose the taker has 8 hearts, thus the Defenders have 6 hearts. In 5.3% of the cases, one Defender has 5 or more hearts. Notice that the sum from any column is 100%. If the taker has 9 trumps, thus the Defense has 12 trumps. There is a 1.1% probability that one Defender has 9 or more trumps.

=== Dog's cards ===
This applies to 4 players and 6-card dog.

Number of missing cards from a particular suit
	1	2	3	4	5	6	7	8	9	10	11	12	13	14	15	16	17	18	19
0	90.0%	80.8%	72.5%	64.9%	57.9%	51.6%	45.9%	40.7%	36.0%	31.3%	27.9%	24.5%	21.4%	18.7%	16.3%	14.1%	12.1%	10.4%	8.9%
1	10.0%	18.3%	25.1%	30.5%	34.7%	37.9%	40.1%	41.5%	42.2%	42.3%	41.9%	41.0%	39.8%	38.3%	36.6%	34.7%	32.7%	30.7%	28.5%
2		0.9%	2.4%	4.4%	6.8%	9.5%	12.3%	15.1%	18.0%	20.7%	23.3%	25.7%	27.8%	29.7%	31.2%	32.5%	33.5%	34.3%	34.7%
3			0.0%	0.2%	0.5%	1.0%	1.6%	2.5%	3.5%	4.7%	6.1%	7.6%	9.3%	11.0%	12.9%	14.8%	16.9%	18.9%	20.8%
4				0.0%	0.0%	0.0%	0.1%	0.2%	0.3%	0.5%	0.8%	1.1%	1.5%	2.1%	2.7%	3.5%	4.3%	5.3%	6.4%
5					0.0%	0.0%	0.0%	0.0%	0.0%	0.0%	0.0%	0.1%	0.1%	0.2%	0.3%	0.4%	0.5%	0.6%	0.9%
6						0.0%	0.0%	0.0%	0.0%	0.0%	0.0%	0.0%	0.0%	0.0%	0.01%	0.02%	0.03%	0.04%	0.06%

Example: Albert is the taker and has no queen; he thus has a 30.5% chance of getting a queen in the dog, 4.4% of two queens. If Florence is the taker and has 8 diamonds, there are 14-8=6 diamonds left, so she has a 51.6% chance of not getting any diamond in the dog at all. If Bertrand is the taker and has 7 trumps, there are 21-7=14 trumps left, so he has a 43% chance of getting 2 or more trumps.

== Signals ==
The Fédération Française de Tarot has developed a system of conventional leads that lets partners communicate the value and number of the cards in hand. An outline of the system follows.

At the outset (indicated by 1 card)

- In a suit:

A card from Ace to 5 signals that the player holds a major honour (King-Queen).
A card higher than the 5 signals that the player does not hold such an honour.

- In trumps:

An odd trump signals possession of at least 7 trumps, and requests that partner play trumps.
An even trump played at the beginning of part announces possession of fewer than 7 trumps.

With the Supply (indicated by 2 cards)

- Suit played by the attacker:

Order going down: behavior 5th in the suit invites to play trump (attention not to have the Petit in hand).
The Excuse on starts attacker with the first or with the second turn promises the behavior

- Suit played by defender:

Two cards of the same suit played in descending order signal that the player held a doubleton in this suit. The player's partner is implicitly expected to continue playing this suit so that the player can overtrump.

When a player indicates the strength of his or her hand by playing a king or an odd trump, it imposes a line of play to which the partners are duty bound to adhere.

Excuse at the first round of trumps: Player demands an end to trumps.

== Bibliography ==
- Daynes, Daniel (2000). Le tarot l: ses règles et toutes ses variantes. Paris: Bornemann. ISBN 9782851826220.
- Depaulis, Thierry (1984). André Dimanche (ed.). Le Tarot de Paris.
- Depaulis, Thierry (2004). "Brève histoire des cartes à jouer". Cartes à jouer & tarots de Marseille : la donation Camoin : collections du Musée du Vieux-Marseille. Marseille: Éd. Alors hors du Temps. ISBN 2-9517932-7-8.
- Dummett, Michael; McLeod, John (2004). A History of Games Played with the Tarot Pack. Lewiston: The Edwin Mellen Press. pp. 195-244.
- McLeod, John; Geiser, Remigius (May–June 1999). "Stubai Droggn and Dobbm - two living fossils of the Austrian card game landscape in". The Playing-Card. Vol. XXVII.
- Parlett, David Sidney (1996). Oxford Dictionary of Card Games. Oxford: Oxford University Press. ISBN 0-19-869173-4.
- Parlett, David (2008). The Penguin Book of Card Games. London: Penguin. ISBN 9780141916101.
- Rockefeller, J.D. (2016). A Comprehensive Guide on the Tarot and Its Cards. CreateSpace Independent Publishing Platform. ISBN 9781523337828.
