= Tarock =

Tarock is German for Tarot and may refer to:

- German Tarok, progenitor of a family of American and Austro-German card games
- Bavarian Tarock, once popular Bavarian card game
- Königrufen, most popular Austrian tarot game, often just called Tarock
- Tarock (card games), generic name for Austrian and German tarot card games
- Württemberg Tarock, name for German Tarok in Württemberg
