= Solo 66 =

Card game

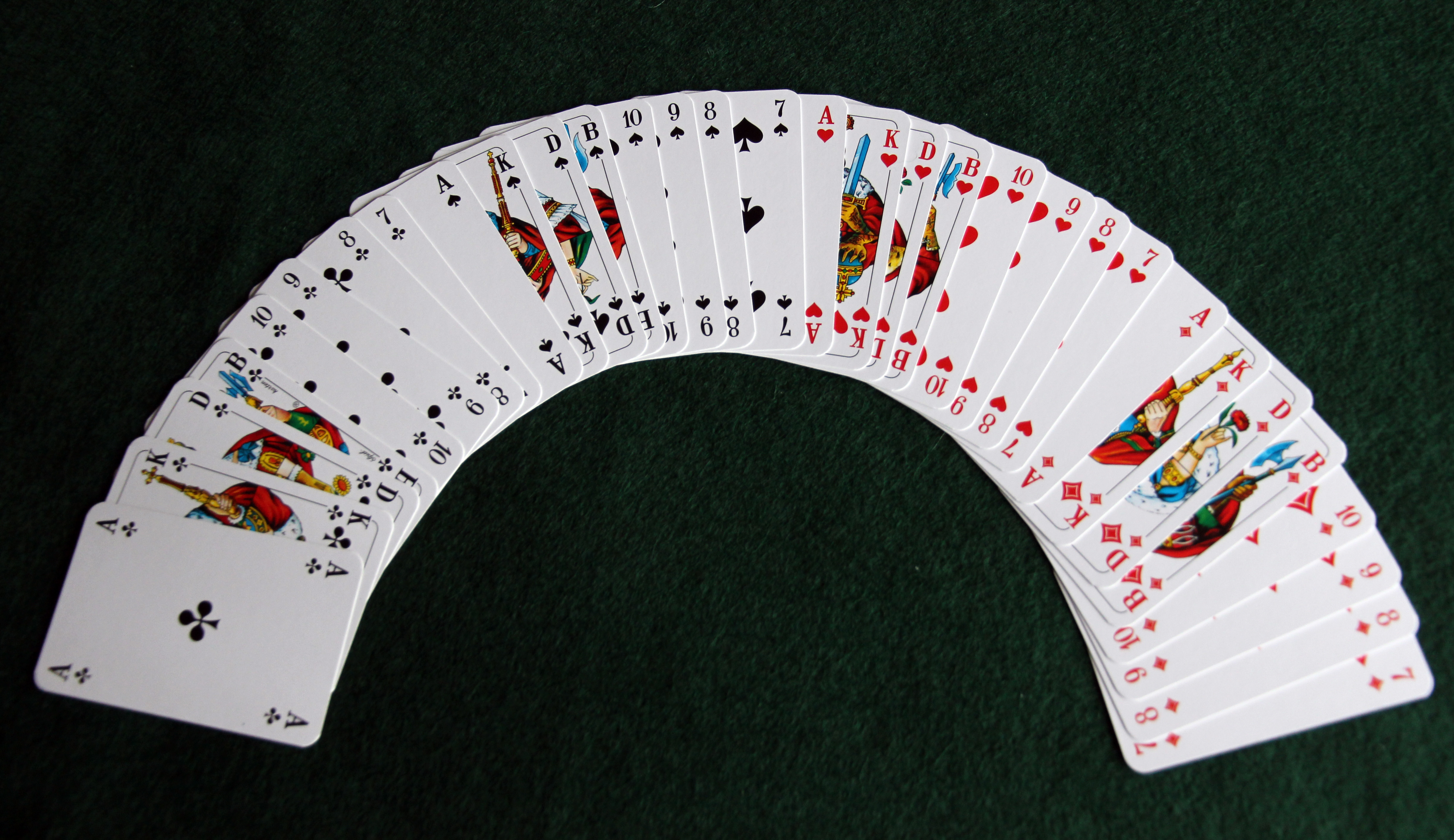
- French-suited 32-card pack
- Origin: Germany
- Type: Trick-taking
- Players: 5
- Skills: Hand evaluation, counting
- Age range: 15+
- Cards: 32
- Deck: French Skat pack
- Rank (high→low): A 10 K Q J 9 8 7
- Play: Clockwise
- Playing time: 5 minutes/hand
- Chance: Low

Related games
- Skat

Solo 66 is a trick-taking ace–ten card game for five players, in which a soloist always plays against the other four. It is based on the rules of Germany's national game, Skat, and is played with a French-suited Skat pack of 32 cards. Bidding is for the trump suit. Jacks are ranked within their respective suits and do not form additional trumps over and above the cards of the trump suit. Grupp describes it as "an entertaining game for a larger group."

== Play ==
The game is played with five people, although there are variants for four players or fewer.

At the start of the game, the dealer shuffles the cards and offers them to be cut, he then deals six cards to each player. The remaining two cards are placed face-down in the middle of the table as the talon. The soloist is determined through a bidding process or auction. The player who bids the highest suit as trumps wins the auction. The suits rank, from highest to lowest, in the order: Clubs, Spades, Hearts and Diamonds. In the auction the player to the left of the dealer (forehand) is the first to bid or pass. The player who is first with the highest bid wins the auction and becomes the soloist. He must then announce the bid or a higher game. He then picks up the two talon cards and may discard two cards of his choice into his pile of tricks. If no trumps are announced and all players pass, there are two options depending on what has been pre-agreed: either the cards are dealt again or a game is played without trumps, whereby the winner is the one who takes the last trick (regardless of his other tricks and card points).

The forehand player leads to the first trick; all other players must either play a card of the same suit (Bedienpflicht) or, if that is not possible, must play a trump. Only if a player has neither a card of the led suit nor a trump may he discard a card of his choice. The player who plays the highest card of the led suit or the highest trump, wins the trick. The cards rank as follows: ace > ten > king > queen > jack > 9 > 8 > 7.

In order to win the game the soloist must have scored more than half the available card points in his tricks by the end of the deal. The cards are valued as in Skat: the 7, 8 and 9 score zero, the jack scores 2, the queen scores 3, the king scores 4, the ten scores 10 and the ace scores 11 card points. Another 10 points is awarded to the player who takes the last trick, so that the maximum score is 130 points and the soloist must finish with at least 66 to win.

Scoring may be agreed beforehand as follows: if the soloist wins, he scores the points he has taken; if he loses, twice the points are deducted from his score. If his opponents have less than 33 points, they are schneider and the winner gets double the normal points; if the defenders fail to take a trick at all (schwarz), the soloist gets triple the points. On the other hand, if he loses with less than 33 points, the triple value is deducted, and if he does not get a trick, he loses four times.

== Literature ==
- Grupp, Claus D. (1975). Kartenspiele. Wiesbaden: Falken-Verlag Erich Sicker. ISBN 3-8068-2001-5.
