= Sans Prendre =

Sans Prendre is French and means "without taking [it]". It may refer to:

- Sans Prendre or Sansprendre, an alternative name for German Tarok, a south German card game
- Sans Prendre, an alternative name for Tapp (card game), a card game from the Württemberg area of Germany
- Sans Prendre, an alternative name for the Bohemian card game of Bavorsky taroky or Tapp
- Sans prendre. an announcement in the historical card game of Ombre
