= 1001 (card game) =

German card game

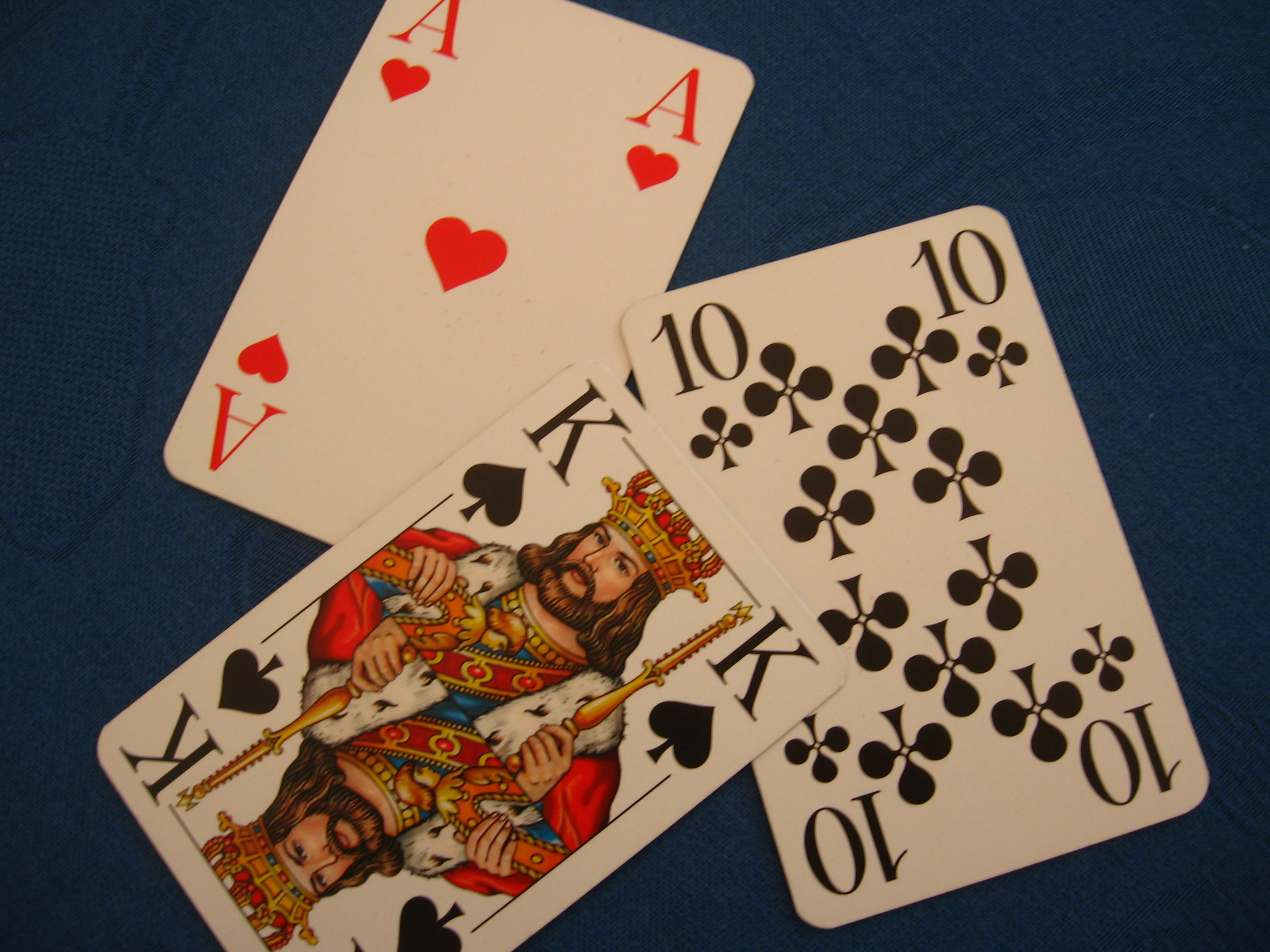
- French-pattern Skat cards used in 1001
- Origin: Germany
- Alternative names: Tausendundeins, Tausendeins, Kiautschou
- Type: Trick-taking
- Players: 2
- Cards: 24
- Deck: French
- Rank (high→low): A 10 K Q J 9
- Play: Clockwise

Related games
- Sixty-Six • 1000

1001 is a point-trick card game of German origin for two players that is similar to sixty-six. It is known in German as Tausendundeins and Tausendeins ("1001") or Kiautschou. The winner is the first to 1001 points, hence the name. Hülsemann describes the game as "one of the most stimulating for two players", one that must be played "fast and freely".

== History and name ==
The first rules were published in 1930 by Robert Hülsemann (1868–1950) who says the game is thought to have been devised by soldiers serving in the German overseas territory of Kiaochow (German: Kiautschou), hence one of its alternative names. This dates its invention to the period 1898–1914. Hülsemann describes the game as "one of the most stimulating for two players" and a game that must be played "fast and freely".

== Rules ==
The following rules are based on Hülsemann (1930), supplemented by other sources where shown:

=== Overview ===
The game is for two players who require 24 cards from a French-suited pack; from 9 to A in each suit. The cards have the usual ace–ten values and ranking as per the table:

Card values
Rank	A	10	K	Q	J	9
Value	11	10	4	3	2	–

There are initially no trumps. However, during play, a player on lead who has a K-Q pair in the same suit may declare a 'marriage' or 'wedding' (Hochzeit) by playing either and naming its suit as trumps. This earns the following points depending on the suit: ♣ – 100; ♠ – 80; ♥ – 60; and ♦ – 40. A player who subsequently declares a K-Q pair in a different suit scores likewise, and that suit becomes the new trump suit. Thus, the trump suit may change up to four times during a deal. However, the same suit cannot be entrumped twice. An alternative scoring system is that the first trump declaration scores 40 points, the second 60 and so on, regardless of suit. A player who fails to take any tricks during the deal may not score for any trump declarations.

=== Deal and play ===
The dealer deals 8 cards each in three packets (3-2-3), beginning with forehand (the non-dealer), and then lays the rest, face down, as the stock. Optionally, the bottom card of the stock is faced to prevent the dealer gaining any advantage from viewing it surreptitiously.

Forehand leads to the first trick. During the first four tricks, players need not follow suit, but may play any card. The trick is won by the highest trump if any are played, or by the highest card of the led suit if no trumps are played. Beginning with the trick winner, both players draw a fresh card from the stock. The trick winner then leads to the next trick.

Once the stock is exhausted (i.e. after the first four tricks), players must follow suit if able; otherwise, must trump or overtrump if possible. In this phase, they must always head the trick if they can.

=== Scoring ===
After each deal, players tot up their card points (see ace–ten table above) and add any points for trump declarations. There are 120 points in the game and, potentially, a further 280 in trump declarations, making a maximum of 400 points per deal. The winner is the first to score 1001 points. The loser pays the agreed rate for every point short of 1001.

== Variants ==
Feder, Gööck and Müller describe the game as being played with 32 cards (7 to A in each suit) and only 6 cards dealt to each player. A pair is called a Mariage.

=== Three-hand 1001 ===
John McLeod describes a three-hand version using 20 cards (10 to A in each suit) in which players are dealt 6 cards each and 2 are dealt to a talon. Players bid in multiples of 10 beginning at 40, the winner taking the talon and making 2 discards. Scores are rounded to the nearest 10. If the game is won, the winning bidder scores as per normal; if it is lost, the bidder's bid is deducted from their score. The winner is the first to score over 1000.

=== Russeln ===
Russeln is another three-hand variant from Melk in Austria played with 24 cards, but this time the trump suits rank for scoring purposes in Préférence order, i.e. ♥ 100 points, ♦ 80, ♠ 60 and ♣ 40. Players are dealt 8 cards each. Bidding is as per Three-hand 1001 above, but with no minimum. Players must head the trick if possible. Scores are rounded up. If the game is won, the winning bidder scores the points taken; if lost, the winning bidder scores minus the amount of the bid. The target score may be 1000 or any other agreed beforehand.

== Literature ==
- Braun, Franz (1966). Spielkarten und Kartenspiele. Hanover: Fackelträger.
- Feder, Jan (1980). Die schönsten Kartenspiele: Über 100 Variationen mit dem Skatblatt. 2nd edn. Droemersche Verlagsanstalt Th. Kanur Nachf., Freising. ISBN 3-426-07628-4
- Gööck, Roland (1967). Freude am Kartenspiel, Bertelsmann, Gütersloh.
- Hülsemann, Robert (1930). Das Buch der Spiele für Familie und Gesellschaft. Leipzig: Hesse & Becker.
- Müller, Reiner F. (1994). Die bekanntesten Kartenspiele. Neff, Berlin. ISBN 3-8118-5856-4
