= Kings in the Corner =

Multi-player solitaire-style card game

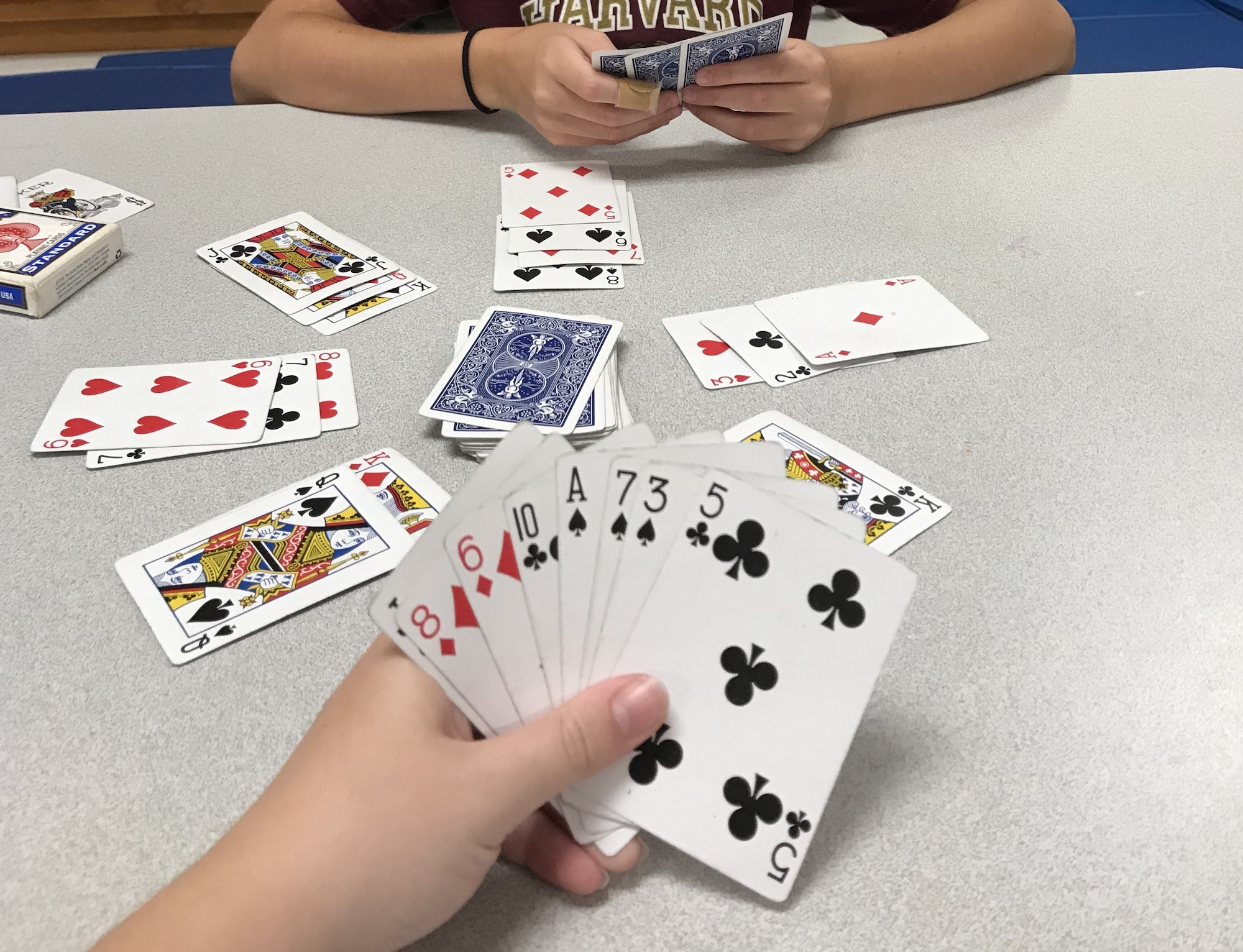
- A standard Kings in the Corner game in progress
- Origin: US
- Alternative name: King's Corners
- Type: Patience
- Players: 2-5
- Difficulty: Tactics
- Age range: 5+
- Cards: 52
- Deck: French-suited
- Rank (high→low): K Q J 10 9 8 7 6 5 4 3 2 A
- Play: Clockwise
- Playing time: ~5 to 15 minutes
- Chance: Moderate

Kings in the Corner, or King's Corners is a multi-player patience or solitaire-style card game for two to four players using a standard 52-card pack. The object is to be first to shed all one's cards.

== Rules ==
=== Deal ===
Players draw a card at random from the pack and the one with the highest card deals first.

Each player is dealt seven cards from the top of the pack. A tableau (layout) is then set up on the playing surface. Four cards are laid down, crosswise and face up, with the rest of the pack face down in the middle as the stock. There is now a card to the north, south, east, and west of the pack, with empty spaces in the corners.

=== Play ===
If two play, the non-dealer goes first. Otherwise, eldest hand, the person to the left of the dealer, starts. In turn, each player may perform any number of the following moves in any order.

1. Attempt to discard from the hand by playing cards in descending numerical order in a suit of the opposite color using the foundation cards of the tableau as a starting point. For instance, if one of the foundations is a ♣4, a player can take a ♦3 or ♥3 from the hand and discard it onto that 4. Players may continue playing as many cards from the hand as are eligible for play in this fashion.
2. If at any time a player has a King in hand, they may place it in one of the empty corners. These corner piles now become active, and cards can be played on them during turns in the same way as the normal tableau.
3. Move an entire foundation pile onto another foundation pile if the bottom card of the moving pile is one rank lower and opposite in color to the top card of the pile it is moved onto.
4. Play any card from their hand to any of the original (N, E, S, W) foundation piles that have become empty (because the pile originally on it has been moved to another pile).

If a player has already laid down a card, it becomes part of the tableau and cannot be picked up, even if the player's turn is not over. At the end of the player's turn, they draw a card from the stock. A player who cannot play any cards in hand (or does not wish to), must draw from the stock and end the turn, or, in an alternate version, draw until a playable card is found, play it, and then end the turn with another draw. If a player has playable cards, they must be played. If the stock is empty, play continues as normal without drawing cards.

=== Winning ===
The first player to play all of their cards onto the tableau is the winner. A variation involves a player collecting each corner they complete, with the winner the player who owns the most corners at the end of play.

Alternately, multiple hands can be played with a running point count for each player. Players receive points for cards left in hand at the end of a round. The game may be played until someone reaches a point threshold, and that player is out of the game. The game ends when all but one player is out. Scoring systems vary, but a common one makes face cards worth two points (except Kings, which are worth 10) and other cards worth one point. Players must agree on the target score; 25 or 50 points is typical.
