= Frog (American card game) =

Trick-taking card game

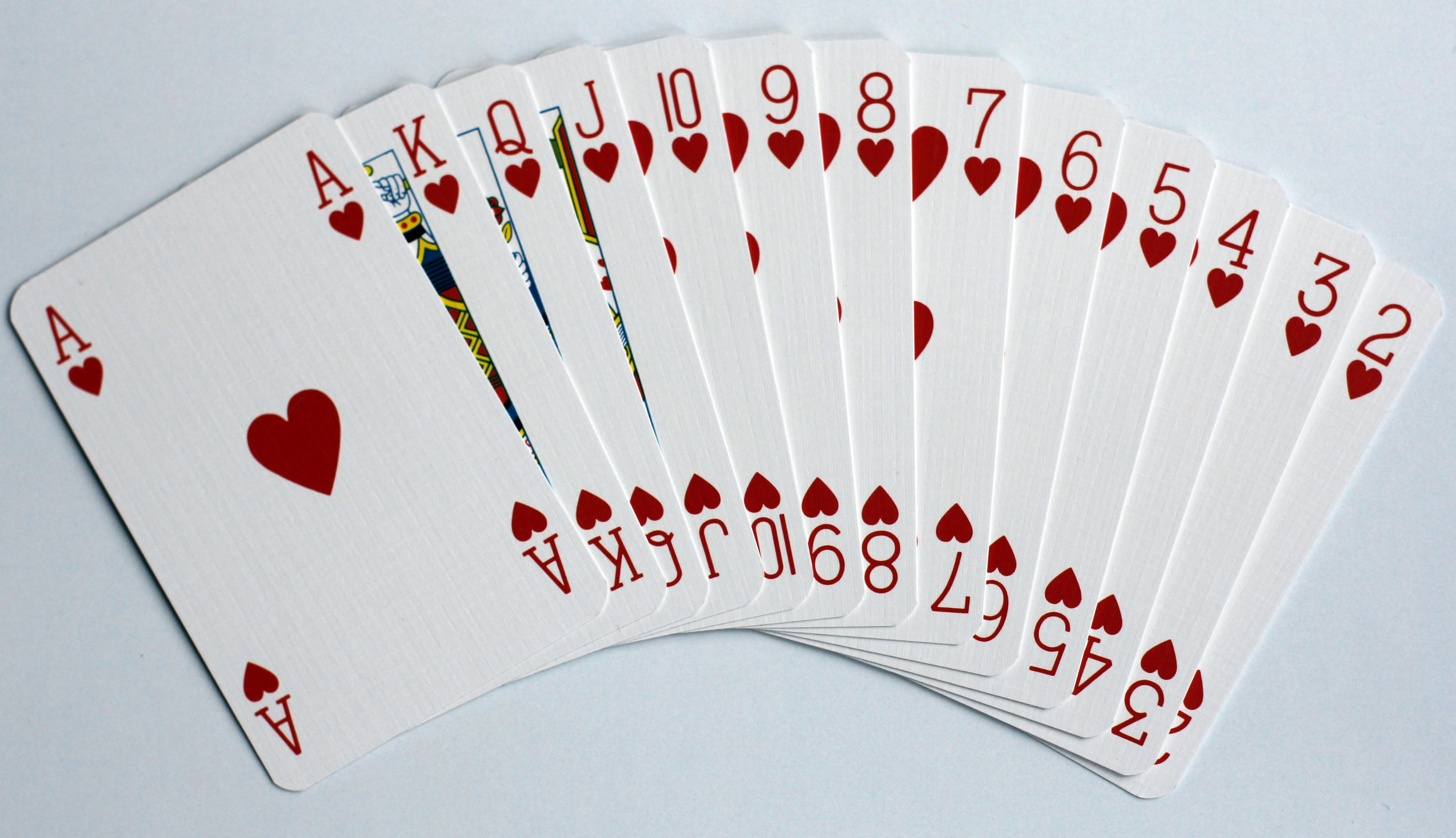
- Hearts are trumps in Frog and Grand
- Origin: United States
- Type: Trick-taking
- Family: German Tarok group
- Players: 3–5 (3 active)
- Cards: 36
- Deck: French
- Rank (high→low): A 10 K Q J 9 - 6
- Play: Clockwise

Related games
- German Tarok • Bavarian Tarock • Six-Bid • Tapp
- Contracts: frog (pick-up), chico (simple solo) and grand (heart solo)

Frog, sometimes called solo sixty, is a trick-taking, card game for 3 players that is or was popular in southern USA and Mexico (where it is known as rana). It is a member of the German Tarok group of games that originate from an attempt to play the tarot card game of Grosstarock with non-tarot cards.

== Background ==
Frog is an American derivative of the south German game of Tapp, with which it is almost identical and which, in turn, descends from German Tarok (Deutschtarok). German Tarok was originally an adaptation of the Tarot card game, Grosstarock, to use standard 36-card German- packs. Later, French-suited cards were also used in Germany. Even the terminology is of German origin: frog being the equivalent of the Tarok bid, Frage (Bavarian: Froag), and 'blind' being a translation of the German word, Blinde, a skat or talon. The three bids of frog, chico and grand equate to the contracts in Tarok known as: Frage, Solo and Herzsolo.

The earliest rules for frog appear in the 1907 edition of Hoyle's Games. Virtually identical rules appear in the 1908 edition of Foster's Complete Hoyle where it is also described as "a very popular game in Mexico, and seems to be an elementary form of Skat, which it resembles in many ways." Almost every American author follows Foster in speculating that frog is derived from Skat, however, as Dummett remarks, "this is, of course, a complete mistake." Moreover, there is no direct evidence that frog or Rana was ever played in Mexico; all the early sources are American.

The variants of Solo or Slough, Straight Solo and Coeur d'Alene appear in the 1922 Official Rules before disappearing again only to resurface in Wood & Goddard (1938). Progressive Solo or Denver Progressive Solo appears in the 1924 Hoyle's Standard Games and is recorded sporadically into the 1960s. The only variant to attain real popularity is the elaboration known as Six Bid Solo which appeared alongside Progressive Solo in 1924 but whose rules are still published today along with frog itself. (Note: See, for example, Parlett (2008) and Beattie (2018).)

== Rules ==
The rules of frog have varied little over time. The following are based on the 1909 edition of Foster's Complete Hoyle which describes it as a "very popular game in Mexico".

=== Players ===
Three to five may play, but there are only ever three active players at one time. With four players, the dealer sits out; with five, cards are dealt to the two players on the left of the dealer and the one on the left. Deal and play are clockwise.

=== Cards ===
Frog is played with a pack of 36 cards, the 2s, 3s, 4s and 5s being removed from a standard 52-card French-suited pack. The cards rank and score, as in most ace–ten games, as follows:

| Rank | A | 10 | K | Q | J | 9 | 8 | 7 | 6 |
|---|---|---|---|---|---|---|---|---|---|
| Value | 11 | 10 | 4 | 3 | 2 | – | | | |

=== Deal and auction ===
The first dealer is chosen by any desired method. The dealer deals a packet of 3 cards to each player, beginning with eldest hand to the left, then 3 face down on the table as the widow (or blind in British rules), and finally two rounds of 4 cards each, i.e. 3-(3)-4-4, so that each player has a hand of 11 cards.

Beginning with eldest, players may pass or bid for one of the following games:

Frog
| Name of contract | Exchange with scat | Suits | Chips/point |
| Frog | Yes | ♥ only | x 1 |
| Chico | No | ♣, ♠ or ♦ | x 2 |
| Grand | No | ♥ only | x 4 |

There is one round of bidding, but a player who announced "Frog" and is outbid by "Chico" may immediately raise to "Grand"; otherwise must pass. The winner of the auction is called the "bidder" (Note: Usually called the "declarer" or "soloist", but here "bidder" is used consistently.) and plays alone against the other two active players. The bidder may not play a higher contract than that which won the auction. In a Frog the bidder exposes the widow, picks it up and discards 3 cards, placing them face down to one side. In Chico and Grand, the widow is untouched.

=== Play ===
Eldest leads to the first trick. Players must follow suit if able; if unable to follow, they must trump if possible. There is no requirement to head the trick. The trick winner takes up the trick and lays it face down before leading to the next trick.

=== Scoring ===
Once the eleventh trick is played out, players count up their card points. For this purpose the widow belongs to the bidder. There are 120 points in the pack and the bidder must score at least 60 to win. (Note: A score of 60 is, in effect, a tie and no payments are made.) In Frog, he scores 1 chip for every point above 60 from each active player. Chico scores double, and Grand quadruple (see table above). If the bidder loses he pays the same rate to every player at the table. This means that if four or five play, the non-active players are also paid by a bidder who loses, but are not required to pay if the bidder wins.

== Rule variations ==
Since the 1950s, most sources modify the pre-war rules slightly as follows: (Note: For example, Culbertson (1957), Goren's Hoyle (1961), Pennycook (1982) and Parlett (2008).)

- The dealer deals 4-(3)-3-4 cards instead of 3-(3)-4-4.
- The widow is not exposed in a Frog

== Variants ==
=== Solo or Slough ===
The 1922 Official Rules published a variant of Frog called Solo or Slough. There were changes to some of the contract names and values:

Solo or Slough
| Name of contract | Exchange with scat | Suits | Chips/point |
| Frog | Yes | ♥ only | x 1 |
| Simple Solo | No | ♣, ♠ or ♦ | x 2 |
| Heart Solo | No | ♥ only | x 3 |

Other differences were:

- The number of possible players increased to seven
- The cards were fanned face down; the player with the lowest chose whether to be dealer or eldest hand for the first deal
- Cards were dealt singly, the 1st, 4th and 8th going to the widow which was called the slough
- In a Frog, the slough was not exposed
- Players started with 11 chips of one colour each worth 10, and 10 chips of another colour, each worth 1
- The first player unable to pay for winnings lost the game
- There were three systems for payments to or from non-active players:
  - They only received payments
  - They paid and received
  - They paid and received for a Solo, but only received for Frog
- In a variation called Penalty Frog, the bidder paid the Heart Solo rate if a Frog contract was lost

=== Straight Solo ===
The same rules mentioned a Straight Solo in which the only change to the Solo/Slough rules above was that the Frog contract was omitted. In a Simple Solo contract, 1 chip was paid per point and 2 chips in a Heart Solo.

Straight Solo
| Name of contract | Exchange with scat | Suits | Chips/point |
| Simple Solo | No | ♣, ♠ or ♦ | x 1 |
| Heart Solo | No | ♥ only | x 2 |

=== Coeur d'Alene Solo ===
The same rules introduced a variant called Coeur d'Alene Solo or simply Coeur d'Alene, this being the name of a town in Idaho. This was the same as Solo or Slough except that there were fixed payments for winning instead of point-based payments. Payments were in the ratio 1:2:3 e.g. 25¢ for Frog, 50¢ for Simple Solo and 75¢ for Heart Solo.

Coeur d'Alene
| Name of contract | Exchange with scat | Suits | Payment |
| Frog | Yes | ♥ only | 25¢ |
| Simple Solo | No | ♣, ♠ or ♦ | 50¢ |
| Heart Solo | No | ♥ only | 75¢ |

== Literature ==
- _ (1907). Hoyle's Games. NY: McClure.
- _ (1922). Official Rules of Card Games. Cincinnati: USPC.
- _ (1924). Hoyle's Standard Games. Cincinnati: USPC.
- Beattie, Rob (2009). The Art of Playing Cards. NY: Quarto. ISBN 9780785836698
- Culbertson, Ely (1957), Phillips, Hubert (ed.), Culbertson’s Card Games Complete, Watford: Argo
- Dummett, Michael (1980). The Game of Tarot. London: Duckworth. ISBN 0715610147
- Foster, R.F. (1909). Foster's Complete Hoyle. NY: F.A. Stokes.Southern
- Goren, Charles (1961). Goren's Hoyle - Encyclopedia of Games. NY: Chancellor Hall, Ltd.
- Parlett, David (2008), The Penguin Book of Card Games, London: Penguin, ISBN 978-0-141-03787-5
- Pennycook, Andrew (1982). The Book of Card Games. London/NY: Grenada. ISBN 0246117567
