= Rutersju =

Swedish card game

- The master card in Rutersju
- Origin: Sweden
- Type: Plain-trick game of exact bidding group
- Family: Oh hell
- Cards: 36
- Deck: Modern Swedish pattern, French-suited pack
- Rank (high→low): ♦7 = master card A K Q J 10 9 8 7 6
- Play: Clockwise

Rutersju is a Swedish trick-taking card game for several players in which the dealer has to make exactly the number of tricks that he or she bid. Its name means "diamond seven" and is derived from its commanding card.

== Rules ==
The following rules are based on Kortspelsregler (1922), Schenkmanis (1988), Wahlström (1993) and Norlin (1996).

=== Cards ===
A pack of 36 French-suited modern Swedish or English pattern cards are used. The Rutersju (♦7) is the highest card in the pack.

=== Deal ===
The players are dealt three cards each and then bid, in turn, for the exact number of tricks they think they can take of the three tricks that are played. The player who made the highest bid becomes the declarer and plays alone against the others aiming to take the tricks bid. If several players announce the same highest bid, the player who bid last becomes the declarer. (Note: This is highly unusual – normally the earlier bidder has precedence.)

=== Play ===
Play is clockwise. The declarer leads to the first trick. Players must follow suit if able, but may otherwise play any card. The Rutersju (♦7) is the master card and always wins the trick it is played to.

=== Winning ===
The declarer receives 1 point for each trick taken, provided that the number of tricks is the same as what was bid. Otherwise, the opposing players receive one point for each undertrick or overtrick by the declarer.

== Bibliography ==
- Kortspelsregler. Stockholm: Wahlström & Widstrand. 1922. pp. 62–63.
- Norlin, Bo (1996). Spela kort och lägga patiens. Stockholm: Natur och kultur. p. 68. ISBN 91-27-06255-4.
- Lek med en kortlek. Stockholm: B. Wahlström. 1993. pp. 61–62. ISBN 91-32-31783-2.
- Schenkmanis, Ulf (1988). Kortspel & patienser. Västerås: ICA. pp. 233–234. ISBN 91-534-1178-1.
