= Tarok =

Tarok may refer to:

- Bavarian Tarok, traditional Bavarian card game played with 36 cards
- Danish Tarok, traditional Danish card game played with 78 tarot cards
- German Tarok, German ancestor of family of American and central European card games played with 36 cards
- Grosstarok, extinct German card game played with 78 tarot cards
- Tapp Tarok, popular Austrian card game of the Tarot family played with 54 cards
- Tarok people, a Nigerian people group, or the Tarok language spoken amongst them.

== See also ==
- Tarock card games
