= Bauerntarock =

Card game

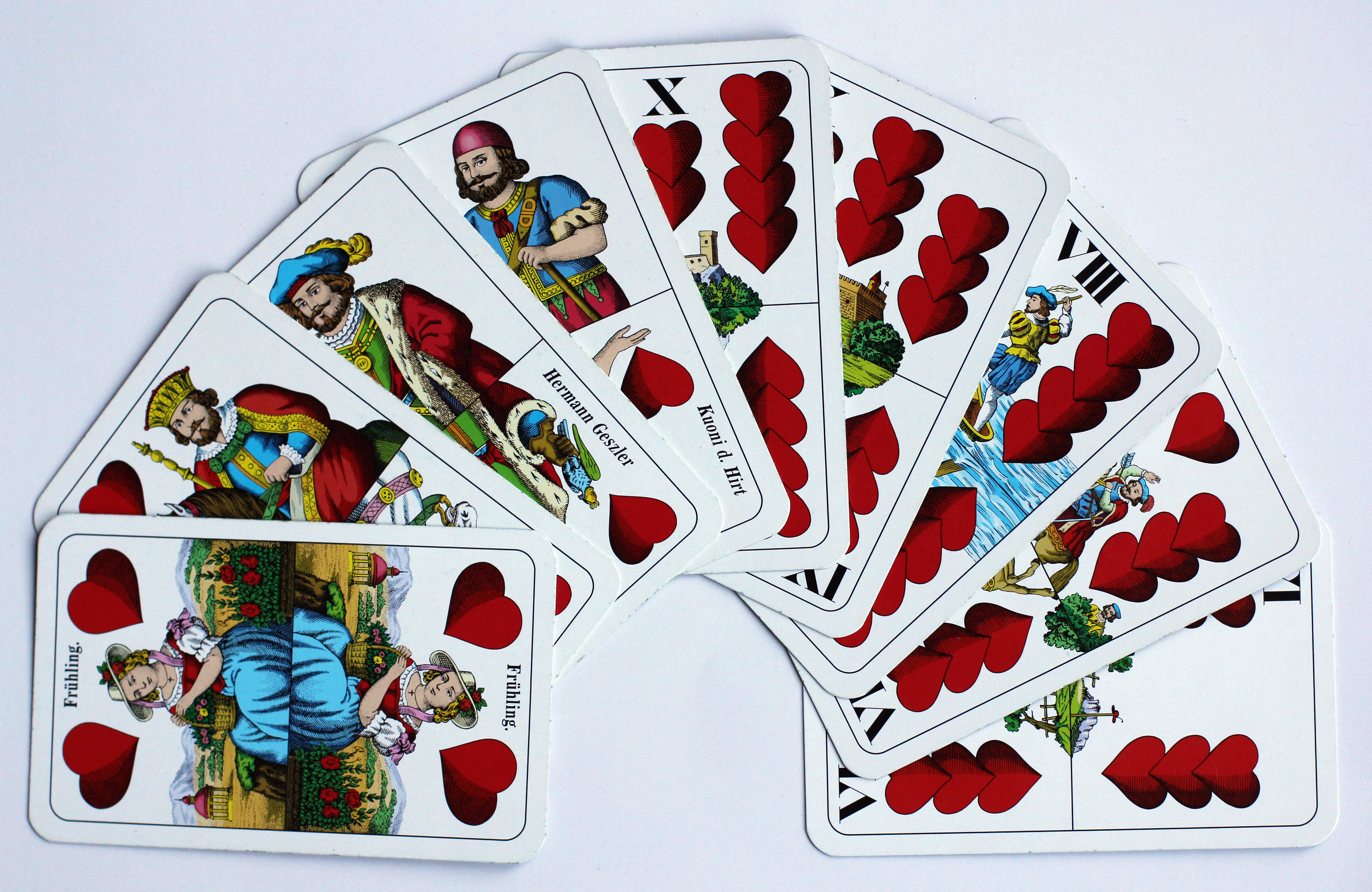
- Hearts are always trumps
- Origin: Austria
- Type: Point-trick
- Family: German Tarok group
- Players: 3-4
- Cards: 36
- Deck: German
- Rank (high→low): D X K O U 9 8 7 6
- Play: Clockwise
- Chance: Moderate

Related games
- Bavarian Tarock • Dobbm • Tapp
- Contracts: Hineinschauen and Sumpern; Special bonus: Spatz

Bauerntarock ("farmers' tarot") also called Brixentaler Bauerntarock or Brixental Tarock, is a point-trick card game played in the Brixental, Austria. It may have originated in the 19th century either as an adaptation of 54-card Tapp Tarock onto the cheaper and smaller 36-card German pack. Another possibility is that it was adapted from the 78-card Grosstarock or Taroc l'Hombre game as the ratio of trumps to non-trumps is almost the same. It uses the Skat Schedule found in popular regional games such as Jass and Schafkopf. It is closely related to Bavarian Tarock, German Tarok, Württemberg Tarock and especially Dobbm. Like Bavarian Tarock and Tapp, Brixental Bauerntarock and Dobbm do not belong to the true tarot games, but have adopted rules from Tapp Tarock. The most fundamental difference between these games and true tarot games is in the use of German or French decks instead of true Tarot playing cards.

== History ==
In 1980, Dummett records Bauerntarock being played in the Brixental valley in Austrian Tyrol under the name "Tarock" or "Bauerntarock", but it is probably much older and more widespread. For example, Bauer and Dollinger note that, during the 1920s and 1930s, the well known Bavarian author, Oskar Maria Graf, "met with friends on his own or other's terraces to chat, drink and play Bauerntarock, often for half the night."

== Cards ==
=== Trick-taking strength ===
The cards’ trick-taking power broadly corresponds to their card point value. Thus the Deuce or Daus (Sau, Ass) is the highest-ranking card. Then follow the: Ten > King > Ober > Unter > Nine > Eight > Seven > Six. This ranking is also valid within the trump suit as well as the plain suits. Hearts are permanent trumps.

Ranking of the cards
Permanent trump suit
D 10 K O U 9 8 7 6
Plain suits
| Acorns | Leaves | Bells |
| D 10 K O U 9 8 7 6 | D 10 K O U 9 8 7 6 | D 10 K O U 9 8 7 6 |

=== Card value ===
The card values are exactly the same as in Schafkopf or the related game of Bavarian Tarock. The ten, with 10 points, is just below the Daus (11 points) in value, but well above the King (4), Ober (3) and Unter (2). The so-called Spatzen ("sparrows" i.e. the Nines, Eights, Sevens and Sixes) only play a role during the game based on their trick-taking ability, but do not score points at the end of the hand.

Ranks and card-point values of cards
| Rank | A | 10 | K | O | U | 9 | 8 | 7 | 6 |
| Value | 11 | 10 | 4 | 3 | 2 | – | | | |

There are 120 card points in the deck. The 6 of bells is marked as "WELI" but has no significance in this game. The lowest trump, the 6 of hearts, however, is called the Spatz (sparrow) and plays a special role in bonuses and penalties mirroring the role of the pagat.

== Rules ==
=== Dealing ===
Like most ace–ten games but unlike other tarot card games, rotation is clockwise. In a three-player game, the dealer passes out eleven cards to each player with three cards going to the talon (stock). With four players, everyone gets eight cards with four going to the talon.

=== Bidding ===
Players bid to become the declarer and play against the others (the defenders). Bidding starts with the player to the dealer's left. Players may make one bid only and have the following options:

- Pass (Weiter): player does not wish to bid.
- Hineinschauen: lower bid announced by saying "ich schaue hinein" ("I'll peep", literally "I'll look into [the talon]"). Enables the declarer to exchange cards with talon.
- Sumpern: higher bid announced by saying "ich sumpere" ("Ta-da!" literally "I'll drum roll [on the kettle drums]"). The declarer may not use the talon (i.e. it is a 'hand game').

There is no 'holding' of a higher bid. If all pass, then the same dealer redeals. If no-one has bid so far, the player to the dealer's right may say "Schöneres" ("better ones"). The dealer may either say "Yes" and re-deal the cards or "No", in which case the player to his right may bid or pass. The dealer then has the same options.

If the declarer is playing a hineinschauen, he picks up the talon and discards 3 cards, saying Lieg' ich to show he is ready. At this point any defender who did not pass may double (spritzen (Note: Dummett says spitzen, but this is probably a typo as the usual Austro-Bavarian term is spritzen.) or gasen) (Note: Including one who had no opportunity to bid.) the game value. The declarer may redouble with "Resi!"

The discarded cards or the unused talon count towards the declarer's score at the end of the hand unless he failed to win any tricks, in which case, he is gmotschd and the talon is forfeited to the defenders.

=== Playing ===
The declarer's goal is to win a majority of card points. The declarer leads to the first trick. Players must follow suit. If void, they must play a trump (i.e. heart). Only when void of the suit led and hearts can any card be sloughed. There is no compulsion to win the trick. The winner of each trick leads to the next one.

=== Spatz bonus ===
There is a penalty of 5 points for losing the Spatz to the opposite side; 10 points if it was on the last trick. There is a bonus of 10 points for winning the last trick with the Spatz. These points are also subject to doubling.

== Scoring ==
The declarer's game score is calculated by subtracting half the points of the hand (60 points for no doubling, 120 for once, 240 for twice, or 480 for thrice) from the hand score (points from captured cards, Spatz penalties or bonuses, and the talon which may have been doubled, redoubled, etc.) After one player accumulates a game score of 100 or more, the number of new hands to play is limited to the current round (everyone should have had an equal chance as dealer). The winner is the player with the highest cumulative game score and the others have to pay the difference. The player with the lowest game score has to pay an extra 20 points to the winner.

== Bibliography ==
- Bauer, Gerhard; Dollinger, Hans (1987). Oskar Maria Graf. Süddeutscher Verlag.
- Dummett, Michael (1980). The Game of Tarot. London: Duckworth. ISBN 0 7156 1014 7.
- Dummett, Michael; McLeod, John (2004). A History of Games Played with the Tarot Pack. Lewiston: Edwin Mellen Press. pp. 125–148.
- Martin, Ulf (2016). "The Tarock of the Skat Inventors part II". The Playing-Card. 44 (3): 164–178.
- Parlett, David (1990). The Oxford Guide to Card Games. Oxford: Oxford University Press. pp. 266-268.
