= Six-bid solo =

Card game

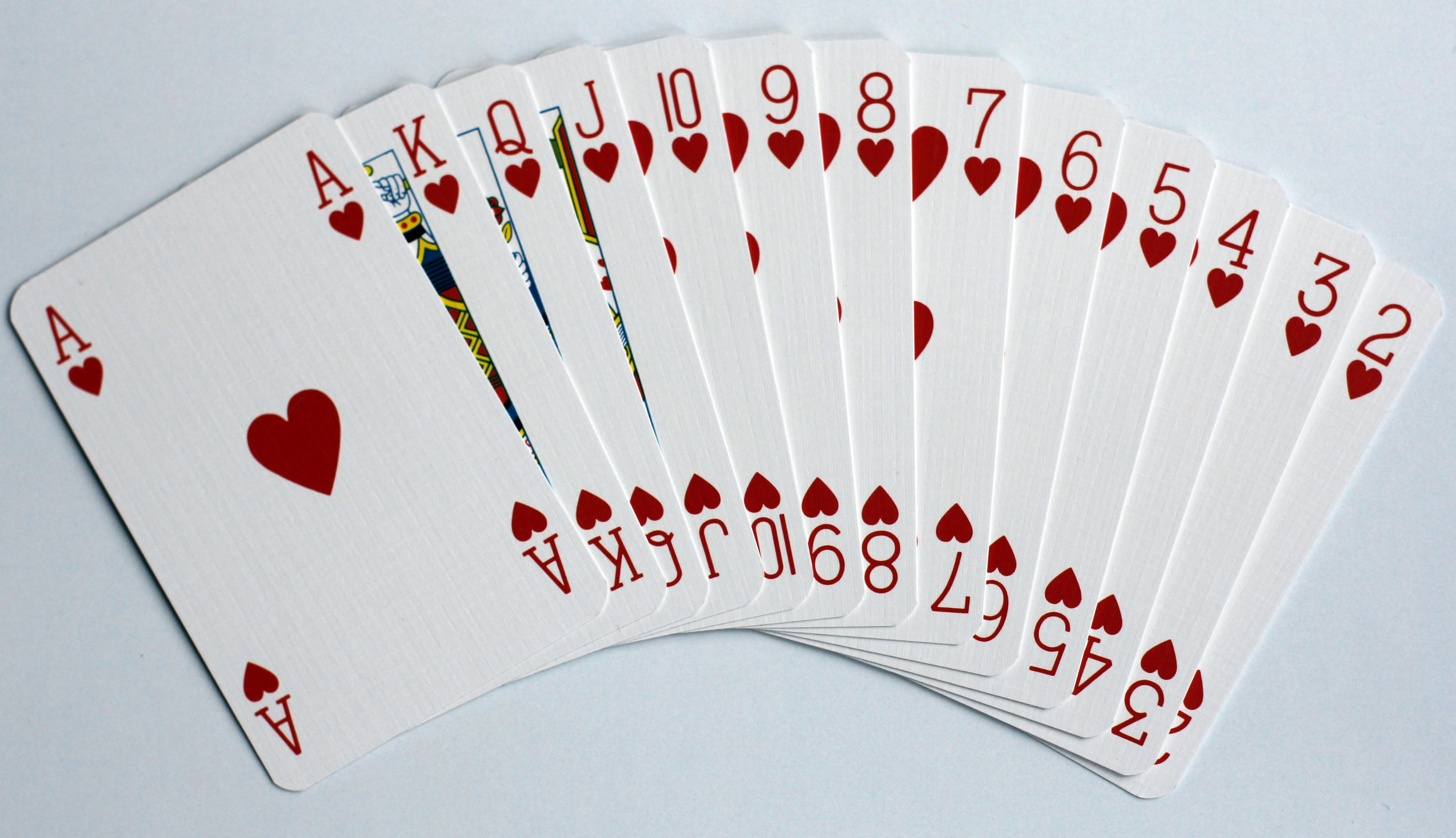
- Hearts are trumps in a heart solo bid
- Origin: Western United States
- Alternative names: Six-bid, six bid solo, Salt Lake solo, American solo
- Type: Trick-taking
- Family: German Tarok group
- Players: 3–4 (3 active)
- Cards: 36
- Deck: French
- Rank (high→low): A 10 K Q J 9 - 6
- Play: Clockwise

Related games
- Frog • Straight Solo • German Tarok • Tapp

Six-bid solo, six bid solo or just six-bid for short, is a trick-taking, card game from the western United States for 3 players and is often associated with Salt Lake City. It is a member of the German Tarok group of games that originated in an attempt to play a tarot card game with standard, non-tarot cards. Six-bid solo itself is a variant of frog, a game very similar to south German Tapp, the Swabian version of German Tarok.

== History ==
The origins of six-bid solo lie with an old south German game called German Tarok (Deutschtarok) which arose in the desire to play the tarot card game of Grosstarock with German-suited, non-tarot cards. German Tarok appeared in the late 18th century and became very popular in Württemberg, Swabia and Bavaria during the 19th century. One offshoot was the game of Tapp, played in Württemberg and Swabia, which was essentially German Tarok with French-suited cards. It may have been Tapp that was brought to the United States by European emigrants and which became the game of frog, the name being derived from the lowest contract in Tapp, which was a Frage or Froag. The rules of frog first appeared in a 1907 Hoyle and, by 1922, a variant called Straight Solo had emerged in which the frog contract had been dropped. This mirrored a practice in German Tarok where the Frage contract was left out in many places, something that was "regrettable" because there was much skill involved in playing it. Six-Bid was an elaboration of Straight Solo from two to six contracts, very like the modern version of Tapp with its contracts to lose or win every trick and in which hearts is a preference suit. The rules for six-bid solo first appeared in the 1924 edition of Hoyles Standard Games (HSG) and have hardly changed since. It was played in Salt Lake City and is sometimes referred to as Salt Lake Solo. The 1940 Official Rules note it as "A Salt Lake Variation" without further elaboration. It is also known as American Solo.

== Rules ==
The following rules are based on HSG supplemented by the other sources cited.

=== Players ===
Six-bid may be played by three or four, but there are always only three active players; if four play the dealer is 'king' and sits out. Some rules state that five or even seven may play but, again, only three are active in any one deal.

=== Cards ===
Thirty-six French-suited cards are used, formed by stripping the 2s, 3s, 4s and 5s from a standard 52-card pack. The cards rank and score, as in most ace–ten games, as follows:

Rank	A	10	K	Q	J	9	8	7	6
Value	11	10	4	3	2	–			

=== Deal and auction ===
Deal and play are clockwise. The first dealer is chosen by any desired method. The dealer shuffles and has the cards cut before dealing a packet of 4 cards to each player, beginning with eldest hand, then 3 each, then 3 cards face down on the table as the widow, and finally 4 more cards each, i.e. 4-3-(3)-4, so that each player has a hand of 11 cards. (Note: Most rules give the order of dealing cards as 4-(3)-3-4, eg. Culbertson (1957), Goren (1961) and Morehead et al. (1991).) If four play, the dealer now sits out and does not participate in the game.

Beginning with eldest, players may pass or bid for one of the six games listed below. Players may not change their announced bid unless overcalled in which case they must immediately raise or pass. The winner of the auction becomes the 'bidder' or 'player' and the widow counts to him or her at the end, except in Misère. The games are shown below in ascending order:

Six-bid or American solo
Name of contract	Bidder's aim	Trumps	Game value
Solo	Take at least 60 points.	♠ ♣ ♦	1 counter/point
Heart Solo	Take at least 60 points.	♥	2 counters/point
Misère	Take no points.	None	40 counters
Guarantee Solo	Take at least 74 (♥) or 80 points (♠ ♣ ♦)	Any	40 counters
Spread Misère	Take no points. Player left of bidder leads and bidder plays ouvert from the 2nd trick onwards.	None	60 counters
Call Solo	Take all 120 points. First, bidder calls for a card and its holder must exchange it with the bidder.	Any	100 counters (♠ ♣ ♦); 150 counters (♥)

Some rules rename Guarantee Solo andSpread Misère to Guarantee and Spread respectively. In a Spread Misère, the bidder's hand is laid down, face up, after the other two players have played their first card. In a Call Solo, if the called card is sleeping in the widow, there is no exchange.

=== Play ===
Except in Spread, eldest leads any card to the first trick and play proceeds clockwise, each player playing one card. Players must follow suit if able; otherwise must trump if able. If they can neither follow nor trump they may discard. There is no requirement to head the trick. The trick winner collects the trick and lays it away face down before leading to the next trick.

=== Scoring ===
Scoring is as per the table above. If the game is won, the bidder is paid the game value by each active opponent; if lost, the bidder pays the same to each player at the table including the dealer if there are four players.

== Progressive solo ==
Another variant of frog that emerged at the same time as six-bid was progressive solo, later also called Denver progressive solo or Denver solo. The 1940 Official Rules subtitle progressive solo as the "Denver Athletic Club variation" without substantiating the statement. Its rules were last recorded in the 1980s so it may now be extinct. Pennycook describes it as a "simple, yet skilful, game." The rules are as for Six-Bid, except where stated.

Three to five may play. (Note: HSG says three or four players; other rules go up to seven, but there are only 3 active players at any time.) This time there are five contracts. Frog is retained and there were four suit solos ranking, in ascending order, ♠, ♣, ♦ and ♥. Players bid in rotation and must initially pass or bid any contract. Once a bid is made, subsequent players must pass, double or overcall. A player whose bid is overcalled may double or raise when the bidding comes around again, otherwise must pass. Any doubling is only between the bidder and the doubler and is cancelled if the current contract is overcalled. A player who has been doubled may redouble when the turn comes around again. Once all bar one have passed, (Note: HSG says when "all have passed", but that makes no sense as the player with the highest bid has no subsequent opportunity or motive to pass.) the player left in becomes the 'bidder' and must play the highest contract announced. In a Frog, the bidder picks up and exchanges with the widow before laying away the three discards, face down, to one side. In any solo, the widow is untouched. In either case, the widow cards count towards the bidder's score at the end of play.

To win, the bidder must then take at least 60 card points in tricks and the widow. If successful, the bidder is paid by each opponent for each point above 60; if unsuccessful, the bidder pays them each the same amount. (Note: Some rules imply, but are not explicit, that the non-active players are paid as well if the bidder loses e.g. HSG (1924).) The tariffs, which are multiplied by any doubling or redoubling, are shown in the summary table below:

Progressive Solo or Denver Solo
Name of contract	Exchange with widow	Suits	Tariff (counters/point)
Frog	Yes	♥ only	1
Spade solo	No	♠	2
Club solo	No	♣	3
Diamond solo	No	♦	4
Heart solo	No	♥	5

In addition, there may be two pots – one for Frog and one for the Solos – to which players ante an agreed amount each deal. Pennycook specifies the same stake for each pot; HSG states that the solo pot receives a double stake from each player.

== Literature ==
- _ (1839). Das Sansprendre-Spiel in Regeln zur richtigen Auffassung und Ausführung desselben nach seinen verschiedenen Nuancen dargestellt (SSR). Bayreuth: Grau 50 pp.
- _ (1881). Ausführliche Anleitung zum Deutschtarokspielen, nebst einem Anhange, enthaltend: ein Verzeichniß über alle technischen oder Kunstausdrücke, Provinzialismen und vulgären Bezeichnungen, welche bei diesem Spiele vorkommen. (AAD) Munich: Cäsar Fritsch. 88 pp.
- _ (1907). Hoyle's Games. NY: McClure.
- _ (1922). Official Rules of Card Games. Cincinnati: USPC.
- _ (1924). Hoyle's Standard Games. Cincinnati: USPC.
- _ (1940). Official Rules of Card Games: Hoyle Up to Date. Cincinnati: USPC.
- Beattie, Rob (2009). The Art of Playing Cards. NY: Quarto. ISBN 9780785836698
- Culbertson, Ely (1957), Phillips, Hubert (ed.), Culbertson’s Card Games Complete, Watford: Argo
- Dummett, Michael (1980). The Game of Tarot. London: Duckworth. ISBN 0715610147
- Gibson, Walter B. (1993) [1974]. Hoyle's Modern Encyclopedia of Card Games. Devizes: Selecta.
- Goren, Charles (1961). Goren's Hoyle - Encyclopedia of Games. NY: Chancellor Hall, Ltd.
- Morehead, Albert H, Richard L. Frey and Geoffrey Mott-Smith (1991). The New Complete Hoyle NY, London: Doubleday.
- Parlett, David (1991), A History of Card Games, Oxford: OUP.
- Parlett, David (2008), The Penguin Book of Card Games, London: Penguin, ISBN 978-0-141-03787-5
- Pennycook, Andrew (1982). The Book of Card Games. London/NY: Grenada. ISBN 0246117567
