= Bavarian Tarock =

Card game

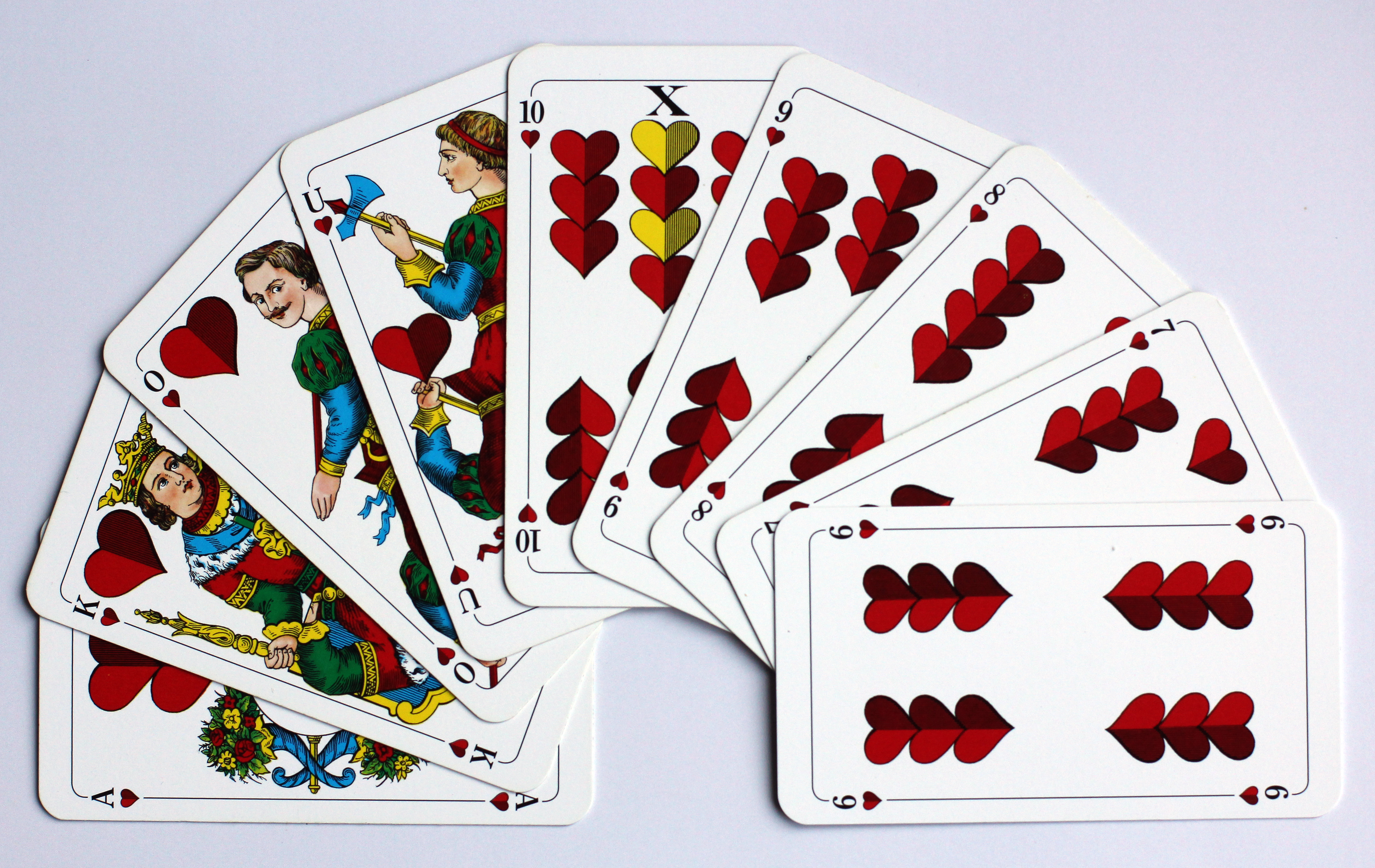
- Hearts are still a preference suit in some versions of Tarock
- Origin: Germany
- Type: Point-trick
- Family: Tapp group
- Players: 3
- Age range: 10+
- Cards: 36
- Deck: German, Bavarian pattern
- Rank (high→low): A, 10, K, O, U, 9, 8, 7, 6
- Play: Clockwise
- Playing time: 45 min.

Related games
- Bauerntarock • Dobbm • German Tarok • Tapp
- Contracts: pick-up, hand and point bidding

Bavarian Tarock (German: Bayerisches Tarock) or, often, just Tarock, is a card game that was once popular in Bavaria and also played in parts of Austria as well as Berlin. The name is a clue to its origin in the historical German game of [Gross-]Tarock, a game using traditional Tarot cards. At some point in the mid- to late-18th century, attempts were made to emulate Tarock using a standard 36-card German-suited pack, resulting in the formerly popular, south German game of German Tarok. During the last century, the variant played with a pot (Haferl) and often known as Bavarian Tarock or Haferltarock, evolved into "quite a fine game" that, however, has less in common with its Tarock progenitor. German Tarok also generated the very similar game of Tapp, played in Württemberg, and both are related to Bauerntarock, Dobbm and the American games of frog and six-bid solo.

While in Bavaria "Tarock" without additions will usually mean this game, in Austria the term refers to true Tarock games, most commonly Königrufen.

== History ==
Bavarian Tarock is descended from an earlier game called German Tarok (Deutschtarok) whose rules are first described in 1839, but which rose to prominence during the 19th century in Bavaria and Swabia, notably in Munich where it was the favourite game of the middle classes. In Württemberg, it became known as Tapp when played with the French-suited cards that were introduced in the mid-19th century, its German-suited equivalent becoming known there as Württemberg Tarock. Meanwhile, the game had spread to Bavaria where it became known simply as Taro(c)k, occasionally as Sansprendre or, if played with a pot, as Haferltarock or Haferltarok. The earliest mention of the name "Bavarian Tarock" occurs in 1917 when it is recorded as being played on the western front at the Somme by German soldiers but this could well be German Tarok under a different name. Meanwhile Haferltarock is mentioned as early as 1880 being played in Munich with a "kitty of 30 or 50 pfennigs" and in 1888 of the "pleasant game of Haferltarock being played for a mark", but this is almost certainly German Tarok played with a pot called a Haferl.

After the First World War, German Tarok was superseded by a family of variants bearing its likeness, all characterised by fixed payments instead of payments based on overshoot points, but retaining Hearts as a preference suit. Variations included game values based on suit hierarchy, and payments for Schneider. After the Second World War, a new variant quickly dominated to become the modern game of Bavarian Tarock or Haferltarock. This version dropped any special status accorded to the suit of Hearts and introduced a more elaborate auction process using point bidding in steps of 5 and a correspondingly more complex payment system recalling that of German Tarok. The result is "quite a fine game", better than Tapp albeit further removed from Grosstarock.

Nevertheless, some simpler variants appear to have survived, according to Sirch (2008), which retain the old three-tier bidding and fixed payment schemes.

According to ASS Altenburger who produce 36-card Schafkopf Tarock packs, as at 2005 there were regions of Bavaria where the traditional game of Tarock was still played. Although the firm noticed that fewer and fewer Tarock packs were being bought they decided not to take the product off the market entirely. In 2017, Bavarian card game author, Erich Rohrmayer, said that Tarock was now extinct in Bavaria, but there is evidence that it was still being played in the late 2010s in Franconia, for example, in Plech, and there are even tournaments in places like Kappel.

== Cards ==
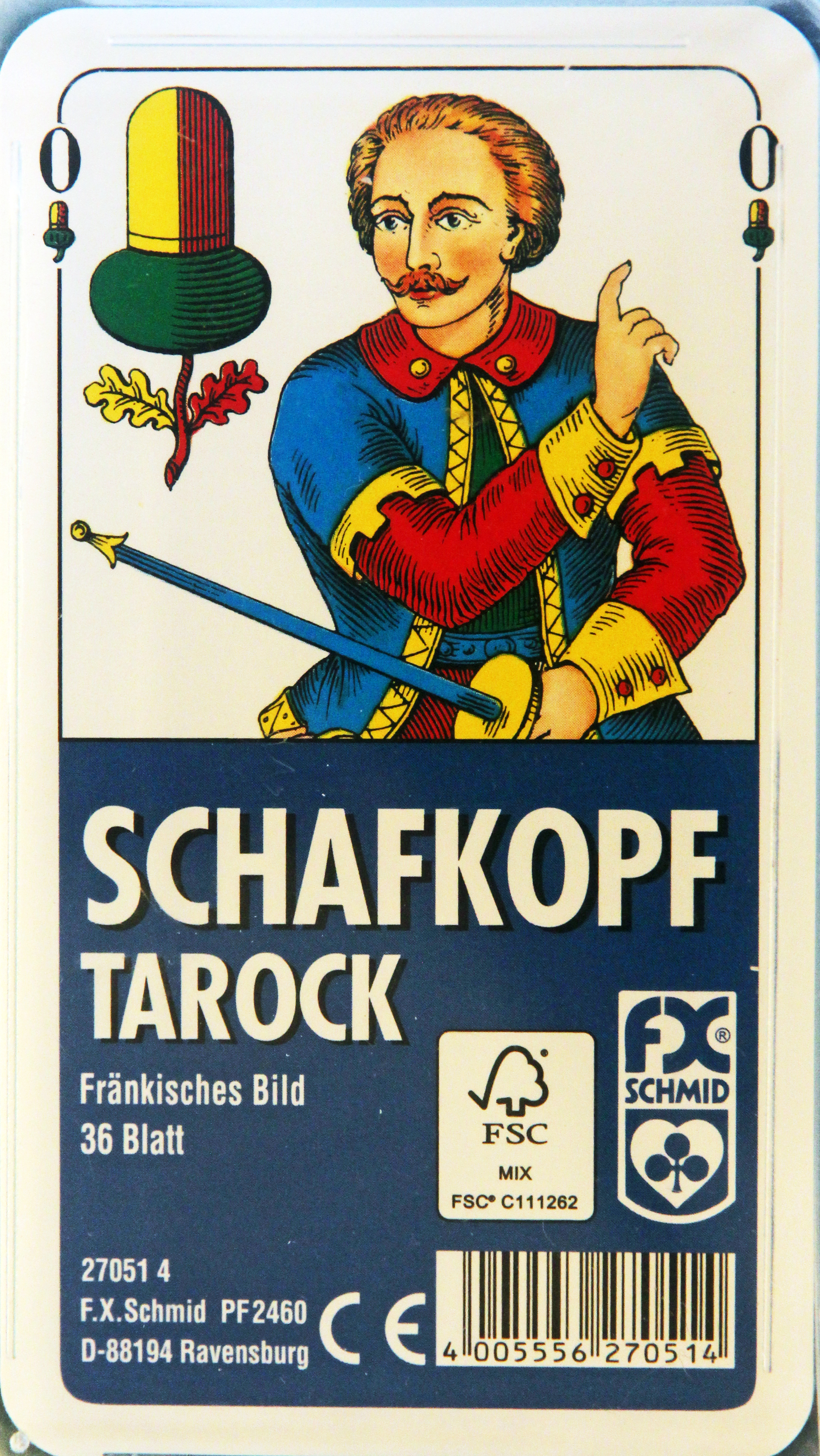
Tarock pack: Franconian pattern

German playing cards are used, traditionally those of the Bavarian pattern, with the values Ace (known in Bavaria as the Sau or "Sow" (Note: The Sow is marked with an "A" and often called an Ace, although in reality it is a Deuce, the Ace having been dropped from German suited cards by the early 18th century - see Hausler.)) to 6. The card deck has a total of 36 cards (4 suits each of 9 cards). In the trade, special card games are sold which are labelled Schafkopf/Tarock (see illustration).

Suits of the German deck
Bells (Schellen)	Hearts (Herz)	Leaves (Gras)	Acorns (Eichel)

=== Card ranking ===
In Bavarian Tarock, a card's trick-taking value generally increases with its face value. The Ace (Aß) or Sow (Sau), symbol A, is the highest card and it is followed by the: Ten (Zehner) (10) > King (K) > Ober (O) > Unter (U) > Nine (Neuner) (9) > Eight (Achter) (8) > Seven (Siebener) (7) > Six (Sechser) (6)

=== Card values ===
The cards have the same point values as in Bavarian Schafkopf. The 10, with ten card points, is just below the Ace (11 points), but well above the King (4), Ober (3) and Unter (2). The value of the Spatzen ("sparrows" – 9 to 6) lies only in their trick-taking ability during a game, but they have no points value when calculating scores at the end of the round.

Ranks and card-point values of cards
Rank	A	10	K	O	U	9	8	7	6
Value	11	10	4	3	2	–			

=== Trumps ===
In the original game, Hearts formed the permanent trump suit unless a Solo was bid. In the later variant, Hearts are the permanent trump suit if the talon is used to replenish cards; otherwise in Hand contracts, the trumps are chosen by the declarer. In the complex version of the game, the trump suit is chosen by the declarer; all nine cards of the chosen suit are trumps and the sequence within the trump suit is unchanged. There are no permanent trump cards in this version, as for example, in Skat, Doppelkopf or Schafkopf.

== Players ==
Bavarian Tarock is a game for 3 players, each of whom is dealt 11 playing cards. Three cards lie face down in the middle of the table and are called the stock or gstaat. This is the same as the talon in many Tarock games. If 4 players are available, the dealer sits out, so that there are 3 players and one dealer who rotates.

== Aim ==
The player who wins the bidding (Reizen) is the 'declarer'. The declarer plays against the other two, the opposition or defenders, and must score at least 61 points to win the deal. In earlier variants, it is a draw and there is no payment if both sides score 60; in the latest variant the declarer loses if the result is 60-60. The game is normally played for small stakes, the amount won depending on the nature of the bid.

== Rules ==
The rules of Bavarian Tarock varied considerably over time. Today there are two main variants. The most commonly published version is called Bavarian Tarock or Haferltarock and is distinguished by its point-bidding system and in which Hearts have no special status. However, a simpler version, usually just called Tarock and reminiscent of the inter-war and immediate post-war period has also survived. The simpler variant will be described first.

=== Tarock (simple) ===
The following is a summary of the rules for the simple, contract-bidding game. The winner of the auction plays alone against two defenders and must achieve the stated contract by scoring at least 61 points. Settlement may be based on overshoot payments as in German Tarok or using fixed payments as in early 20th-century Tarock.

Each player draws a card from the pack. The player with the highest card (or first Ace) deals first. The dealer shuffles, offers the cut to his right, and places 3 cards as the talon, called the Gschdaad or gstaat, on the table. The dealer then deals 11 cards each in packets (4 – 3 – 4). There are three possible contracts and, in every case, the declarer must score at least 61 points to win. Scoring 91 or more is a Schneider and taking all tricks is a Durch. In a Frage the declarer exchanges 3 cards with the Gschdaad; in either Solo contract, it remains untouched. The Gschdaad or discards belong to the declarer at the end. The contracts are summarised below in ascending order:

Bavarian Tarock (simple)
Name of contract	Exchange with stock	Trumps	Point-based payments	Fixed payments (alternative system)
Frage	Yes		Simple win: ½c/point Durch: 60c	Simple win: 25c Schneider: 30c
Solo	No		Simple win: 1c/point Durch: 120c	Simple win: 50c Schneider: 60c
Herzsolo	No		Simple win: 1c/point Durch: 120c	Simple win: 50c Schneider: 60c

Forehand opens the bidding with "pass" or "I'll play" ("ich spiele"). If unchallenged, he may announce any contract. A subsequent player wishing to overcall the first bidder says "I'll play better" ("Ich spiele besser"); thus committing to a Solo or Herzsolo. To overcall the second bidder, rearhand (the dealer) must announce "I'll play best" ("Ich spiele am besten"), but may then only play a Herzsolo. An earlier bidder may "hold" a higher subsequent bid. There is only one round of bidding with immediate hold.

Forehand leads to the first trick. Players must follow suit or trump if unable to follow, but there is no compulsion to head the trick. If they can neither follow nor trump, they may play any card. The trick is won by the highest card of the led suit or highest trump if any are played. The two defenders keep their tricks in a single pile.

The declarer must score 61 to win. If both sides score 60, the game is drawn and no payments are made. There are two alternative payment systems:

- Point-based payments. Players contribute an agreed amount to a pot, (Kasse) at the start of the session. If a game is won, the declarer collects the winnings from the pot; if it is lost the declarer pays directly to the two defenders who divide the winnings. The rate for a Solo or Heart Solo is double that of a Frage. For simplicity, payments are usually rounded up to the nearest 5ȼ. A declarer who wins every trick makes a Durch and collects double. In the following examples, the tariff is assumed to be ½c/point for a Frage and 1c for a Solo or Heart Solo.

Example 1: Anton wins a Frage with 71 points. There are 11 overshoot points worth 11c, so this is rounded up and he collects 15c from the pot.
Example 2: Anton loses his Heart Solo to Berta and Charlotte, scoring 50 points. He pays 10ȼ to the two defenders who receive 5ȼ each. Had he scored 49, he would have paid 15ȼ and an additional 5ȼ would have been drawn from the pot in order that Berta and Charlotte could each receive 10ȼ.
Example 3: Charlotte wins a Leaf Solo, taking every trick. She has 60 overshoot points worth 60 x 1c = 60c, but this is doubled to €1.20 for the Durch which she collects from the pot.

- Fixed payments. Sirch describes an alternative system in which there is no pot and players pay one another directly. So a simple Solo or Heart Solo win (61-90 points) earns 50ȼ from each defender and a schneider (91 or more points) earns 60ȼ from each. If the declarer loses, the amount is paid to each defender. A Frage is worth half these payments.

=== Tarock (with Bettel) ===
The simple version of Tarock may be played with a Bettel contract; an optional feature that emerged during the interwar period. It is a misère-type contract in which the declarer aims to lose every trick; this is found in many other games including Skat (under the name Null) and Bavarian Schafkopf. As before, there are 3 players who use a 36-card Bavarian pattern pack. Deal and play are clockwise. There are typically five bids which, in ascending order, are:

- Frage (Stockspiel in den übrigen Farben)
- Heart Frage (Stockspiel in Herz)
- Solo (Handspiel in den übrigen Farben)
- Heart Solo (Handspiel in Herz)
- Bettel

In a Bettel, the declarer may not take any tricks and card points are not counted. It is only worth playing if a player has mainly blanks (Note: Low cards with no point value) (Spatzen or "sparrows") and/or is void (Note: Has no cards in that suit) (frei) in one suit - in order to be able to discard individual high cards at one's leisure. Also the ranking of the card values changes: the 10 becomes 'low', i.e. it ranks between the Unter and the 9 in each suit. Otherwise, the ranking of the cards remains the same. There is no trump suit and players must follow suit without exception (known as Farbzwang). A Bettel is the highest ranking contract and winning it earns four times the basic game stake.

=== Bavarian Tarock or Haferltarock ===
Since the Second World War, a point-bidding variant of Bavarian Tarock has emerged and is the one recorded in the majority of game books. This is referred to by Dummett as Haferltarock, although that term has been used since the 1880s for variants of classic Tarock played with a pot, but without point bidding. The following rules are based on Danyliuk.

Preparation and dealing is as above except that players contribute an agreed amount such as 50 cents to the Haferl ("pot"). The dealer then deals four cards to each player, then three cards, then three to the stock and finally a further four cards to each player. Players pick up their hands and bidding proceeds clockwise, commencing with forehand. Each player may "pass" (Ich passe) or announce the minimum legal contract. The first positive bid is announced by "play" or "I'll play" (Ich spiele) which is an offer to play the lowest contract, known as an Aufnahmespiel or "Pick-Up". This may be outbid by a subsequent player announcing "I'll play too" (Ich spiele auch), which is an offer to play a Handspiel or "Hand" contract. The earlier bidder may bow out by saying "pass" or hold by saying "I'll play on" or "I'm playing first" (Ich spiele vorn). Bidding passes back and forth between the first two players to announce a bid until one of them passes. Only then may the third player enter the bidding by announcing a higher bid than the highest to that point

The meaning of the two contracts is as follows:

- Pick-Up or Frage (Stockspiel, Aufnahmespiel, Hineinschauen, Fragespiel). The declarer undertakes to win at least 61 points 'with' the stock i.e. by picking it up and exchanging up to 3 cards with it; the discards counting towards his score. The declarer then chooses trumps. In another variant, which resembles the earliest rules, Hearts (Bavarian: Herz-Neischaugn) are the only trump suit permitted for this contract.
- Hand (Handspiel). The declarer undertakes to win at least 61 points 'without' picking up the stock i.e. he will play from his hand only. He puts the stock to one side, unseen, where it will counts towards his score at the end. He announces straight away which suit will be trumps.

The added complexity of this modern variant is the ability to bid still higher. Essentially, once a Hand contract is bid; bidding may continue in steps of five. For example, a player may say "And five" or "Five more" (Fünf mehr), which means that 66 points is the target needed to win. His opponent may outbid this with "And ten" or "Ten more" (Zehn mehr), setting 71 points as the target. This continues until one of the players passes.

If no-one bids or chooses a contract, the cards are thrown in and redealt by the next player.

Play is clockwise as before. Forehand leads to the first trick. Players must follow suit (Farbzwang), failing that they must play a trump (Trumpfzwang). (Note: Danyliuk actually states that Farbzwang and Stichzwang apply, but it appears clear from the rest of her text that she means Farbzwang and Trumpfzwang. That would bring her rules into line with other leading sources such as Dummett or Kastner & Folkvord and follows the original practice based on the Tarock games from which Haferltarock is descended.) Only if the player no longer has any trumps may he discard any card. The trick is won by the highest trump if any are played or by the highest card of the led suit if no trumps are played.

Once the last trick has been played, players tot up the card points in their tricks. The declarer needs 61 points to win; otherwise the defenders have won, even if the score is 60-60. Payment is as follows:

- Pick-Up
  - Declarer wins:
    - 61-65 points: 5 cents from the pot
    - every additional point: +1 cent from the pot
  - Declarer loses:
    - 56-60 points: 5 cents to one defender; the other defender takes 5 cents from the pot
    - every point below 56: -1 cent to one defender; the other defender takes 1 cent from the pot
- Hand: all games are paid directly from the loser(s) to the winner(s) at double the above rate

The round ends when the pot is emptied.

In some places there is a tradition, that a player who is not forced to bid by the opposition, may raise the bid himself. But in self-bidding, the contract must be played as a Hand, i.e. the stock may not be used. If the number of points announced by the declarer is not achieved, he loses the round.

== Other variants ==
=== Berliner ===
With the so-called Berliner, only the dealer is allowed to play a game using the stock. The other players may only declare a Hand contract. At the same time it is sometimes agreed that the dealer may only play with hearts as the trump suit in a contract where the stock is viewed.

=== Sharp Tarock ===
The famous Bavarian author, Ludwig Thoma, played something called 'Sharp Tarock' (Scharfer Tarock) which may have involved a shortened pack. In 2018, Stefan Vogl published a Tarock app with such a pack. This largely follows the intermediate rules above, but uses just 24 cards (from Ace to Nine) and players are dealt a hand of seven cards each. Players bid in clockwise rotation, beginning with forehand, and the first to bid "play" becomes the declarer unless a subsequent player nominates Hearts as the trump suit, in which case the latter has precedence. If two players want to bid in Hearts, the first wins. If only one player bids and plays in Hearts, that player has the option of playing a Frage whereby the Stock may be viewed and up to 3 cards exchanged. In a Frage, the game value is halved if the declarer wins, but is paid as a Solo if the game is lost. Players start with 10 euros each and 61 points are needed to win; if the declarer scores 60, the game is lost. A Solo or Herzsolo is valued at 10 cents. In addition there is an extra 10 cents for winning schneider and 10 cents for schwarz (winning all tricks and 120 points). These rates are paid to the declarer by each defender if the contract is won, or by the declarer to each defender if it is lost. In a Frage these values are halved if the declarer wins; if he or she loses, the full Solo value is paid out. For example, a declarer winning a Herzsolo with 91 points earns 10 (for the win) + 10 (for the Schneider) = 20 cents from each defender; had it been a Frage the declarer would have earned 5 + 5 = 10 cents from each defender. If the declarer had lost by the same margin, in both cases, the defenders would receive 20 cents each. The cards in the Stock always belong to the declarer which means the declarer cannot lose Schwarz unless there are three 9s in the Stock.

== Doubling ==
If an opponent of the declarer is convinced that the latter will lose, they may double by announcing "Kontra!" before the first card is played, whereby the opposing party becomes the player and must now achieve the objective of the declarer (61 points with no bidding, correspondingly higher if there has been a bidding round). The Kontra announcement effectively means "double" and thus doubles the value of the game. The declarer may respond to "Kontra!" with the announcement "Re", thereby confirming his original game goal and doubling the game value again. Doubling the value of the game by calling Kontra and Re and possibly by calling higher bids such as Supp, Resupp and Hirsch are rather unusual in Bavarian Tarock. However, such bidding may be permitted.

== Literature ==
- _ (1839). Das Sansprendre-Spiel in Regeln zur richtigen Auffassung und Ausführung desselben nach seinen verschiedenen Nuancen dargestellt. Bayreuth: Grau (50pp).
- Über Land und Meer: Deutsche illustrierte Zeitung. Vol. 60. Deutsche Verlags-austalt. 1888.
- _ (1881). Ausführliche anleitung zum Deutschtarokspielen. Munich: Cäsar Fritsch. 88 pp.
- Anton, Friedrich (1879). Encyclopädie der Spiele, 3rd edn. Leipzig: Otto Wigand.
- Danyliuk, Rita (2017). 1 x 1 der Kartenspiele von Bridge über Poker und Skat bis Zwicken : Glücks- und Familienspiele : Kartentricks und vieles mehr (in German). Hannover: Humboldt. ISBN 978-3-86910-367-9. OCLC 1019706052.
- Dummett, Michael (1980a). The game of Tarot : from Ferrara to Salt Lake City. London: Duckworth. ISBN 0-7156-1014-7. OCLC 7275570.
- Dummett, Michael (1980b). Twelve tarot games. London: Duckworth. ISBN 0-7156-1488-6. OCLC 7605627.
- Eaton, Paul (2022). "German Tarok - Part 2: Bavarian Tarock" in The Playing-Card, Vol. 51, No. 1 ed. by Peter Endebrock. ISSN 1752-671X pp. 17–27.
- Grupp, Claus D. (1997). Doppelkopf - Schafkopf - Tarock. Original edition. Falken, Niedernhausen/ Ts. ISBN 3-635-60223-X
- Grupp, Claus D. (1996/ 1997). Kartenspiele im Familien und Freundeskreis. Revised and redesigned edition. Original edition. Falken, Niedernhausen/ Ts. ISBN 3-635-60061-X
- Hausler, Manfred (2016). Trommler und Pfeifer: Die Geschichte der Bayerischen Spielkarten, 2nd edn., Volk Verlag, Munich. ISBN 978-3-937200-89-7
- Huber, Franz (1923). Tarok und andere beliebte Kartenspiele (in German). Dresden: Rudolphsche Verlagsbuchhandlung.
- Kastner, Hugo; Folkvord, Gerald Kador (2005). Die grosse Humboldt-Enzyklopädie der Kartenspiele : die ersten 500 Jahre (in German). Baden-Baden: Humboldt. ISBN 978-3-89994-058-9. OCLC 181460224.
- Schmidt, J. St. (1851). Leitfaden zur richtigen Auffassung und Ausführung des Tarok-Spiels. Nuremberg: Schmidt.
- Sirch, Walter (2008). Vom Alten zum Zwanzger - Bayerische Kartenspiele für Kinder und Erwachsene - neu entdeckt (in German). Bayerischer Trachtenverband.
- Salomonski, Martin (1917). Ein Jahr an der Somme. Trowitzsch & Sohn.
