= German Tarok =

Card game

- The common ancestor of several American and south German games
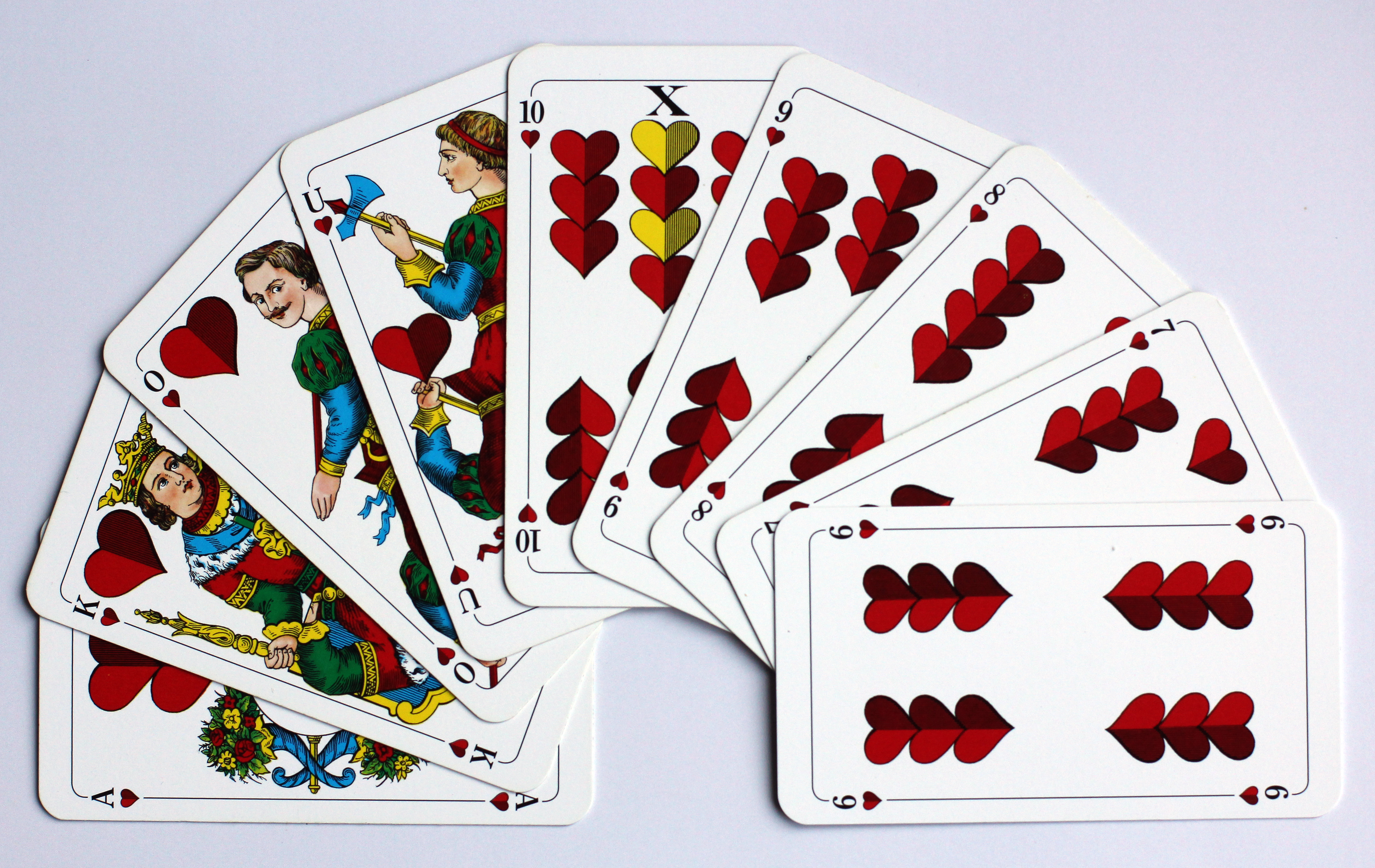
- Hearts: the preference suit
- Origin: Bavaria
- Alternative names: German Tarock, Tarok, Sansprendre. Native names: Deutsch-Tarok, Deutscher Tarock, Tarock
- Type: Point-trick
- Family: German Tarok group
- Players: 3
- Age range: 10+
- Cards: 36
- Deck: German, Bavarian or Württemberg pattern
- Rank (high→low): A, 10, K, O, U, 9, 8, 7, 6
- Play: Clockwise
- Playing time: 6 min/deal

Related games
- Bauerntarock • Bavarian Tarock • Frog • Grosstarock • Tapp
- Contracts: Frage, Solo and Heart Solo; no point bidding.

German Tarok, sometimes known as Sansprendre or simply Tarok, is an historical ace–ten card game for three players that emerged in the 18th century and is the progenitor of a family of games still played today in Europe and North America. It became very popular in Bavaria and Swabia during the 19th century before being largely superseded by Schafkopf, but has survived in the local forms of Bavarian Tarock and Tapp. During the mid-19th century, it became the most popular card game among Munich's middle classes and was also played in the late 19th and early 20th centuries by notable Bavarian author Ludwig Thoma, frequently appearing in his novels and journal articles. It was superseded after the First World War by other forms such as Bavarian Tarock.

German Tarok originated in an attempt to play the Tarot game of Grosstarock with a standard 36-card German-suited pack instead of Tarot cards, but later evolved into a much more interesting game featuring bidding and a suit of preference. The family of games descended from German Tarok includes Austrian Bauerntarock, Mexican rana and the American games of frog and six-bid solo.

== Name ==
The name of the game was variously spelt in German as Deutsch-Tarock, Deutsch-Tarok, Deutsch Tarrok, Deutschtarok, Deutscher Tarok, Deutscher Taroc, or simply Tarok. In English it is rendered German Tarok or German Tarock.

When the new variant appeared in the 1830s, it was initially called Sansprendre, based on the name of its Solo contract; sans prendre being French for "without picking up" and referring to the fact that, in a Sansprendre contract, the declarer could not make use of the scat (skat) – the 3 cards left over after the deal. However, with the demise of the original game, the name German Tarok or Tarok passed to the new one, although the name Sansprendre persisted in some circles. (Note: See for example Schmidt (1851), Anton (1879) and TSP (1889).) For example, in 1878 a Nuremberg choir song features a pub in which four play Sans Prendre into the night while a quintet plays Schaffkopf or Quodlibet.

By the 1870s, French-suited cards had penetrated into the southwest German states, notably the Kingdom of Württemberg, the variety of German Tarok played with French cards being renamed Tapp, while the game played with the traditional German cards of that region was called as Württemberg Tarock. Both, however, were much the same as the game played in Bavaria. Another name recorded by Anton (1879) was Solo, the German name of the Sansprendre contract.

== History ==
The earliest reference to German Tarok dates to 1795 in Illerfeld in Upper Swabia in what was then the Electorate of Bavaria. However, it is likely that the game emerged in the south German states in the mid-18th century as an attempt to play the German Tarot game of Grosstarock with standard German-suited cards. The original game became sufficiently popular that by around the early 19th century, standard German-suited packs were simply labelled "German Taroc" (Deutsch-Taroc). No detailed rules for the original form have survived, but it is briefly described in the forward of an 1839 treatise, the author calling it "very simple and without interest" compared with the subject of the booklet, Sansprendre, a variant he considered so good that it would be hard to find a more interesting game played with German-suited cards. This new variant had superseded its original form by the 1830s, taking on its name by the 1850s. Thereafter it was usually called German Tarok or simply Tarok, although the name Sansprendre continued to be used in some regions, especially Franconia.

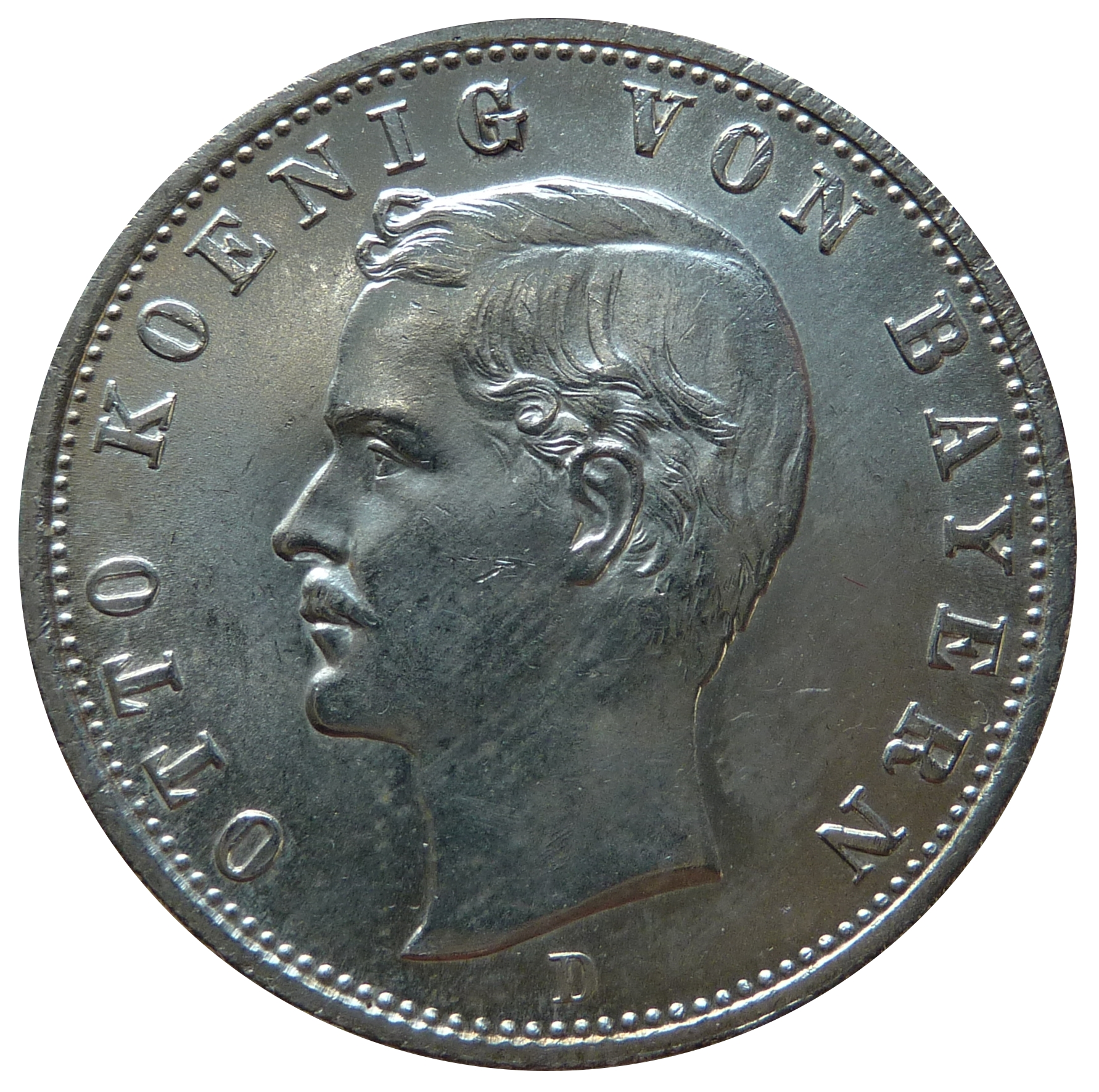
Silver Thaler, 1909

By the mid-19th century German Tarok was the card game of choice for the middle classes in the Bavarian capital of Munich, being played almost to exclusion of all others. It 1864 it was the most popular game in Augsburg. Treatises specifically on the game were published in Bayreuth, Munich and Nuremberg from the 1830s to the early 20th century, further testifying to its popularity in Bavaria, but it was also known further afield, for example, in Hesse and Prussia. (Note: 6 For example, it is mentioned metaphorically in Bing (1879), and in a novel by Byr (1872).) During this time the rules of the game remained remarkably stable, the main changes being elaborations to its systems of payment. German Tarok was a penny ante game, usually played for low stakes. An 1876 table of "card game tariffs" gives 3 levels of payment for games played with a Laus-Tiegel (common pot) as well as additional payments if blocks or a pool (Poule) was used. In the cheapest, winning a Frage with up to 20 overshoot points was worth 5 pfennigs, winning with 21 to 40 was worth 10 pfennigs and over that was worth 15 pfennigs.

German Tarok in its later form lasted into the early years of the 20th century, when it was a favourite of the wealthy Bavarian author Ludwig Thoma, who played it before and during the First World War. He is known to have played both at 'Sharp Tarock' and Tarock with Talerblocks i.e. blocks or counters valued at 3 Marks or 1 Thaler.

However, it fell into steady decline as Schafkopf gained the ascendancy. After the First World War, scoring with overshoot points and complex payment schemes were dropped in what became known as Bavarian Tarock. During this time a large number of local and regional variants appeared, some of which survive. However, the dominant version today is the point-bidding version of Bavarian Tarock or Haferltarock that emerged after the Second World War.

== Cards ==
Suits of the German deck
Bells (Schellen)	Hearts (Herz)	Leaves (Gras)	Acorns (Eichel)

The game is played with a pack of 36 German-suited cards. In that part of Swabia outside of Bavaria, these were of the Württemberg pattern. (Note: Hence the name Württemberg Tarock. However this pattern is now only available in packs of 2 × 24 for playing Gaigel and Binokel.) In Bavaria itself, cards of the Bavarian or Franconian pattern would have been used. These are still widely available and marketed as "Schafkopf Tarock" packs (see illustration). These standard German packs have cards ranking from Ace (Bavarian: Sau or "Sow". (Note: The Sow is marked with an "A" and often called an Ace, although in reality it is a Deuce, the Ace having been dropped from German suited cards by the early 18th century – see Hausler.)) to 6. Thus the pack has a total of 36 cards in 4 suits each of 9 cards.

=== Ranking ===
In Bavarian Tarock, a card's trick-taking value generally increases with its face value. The Ace (Aß) or Sow (Sau), symbol A, is the highest card and it is followed by the: Ten (Zehner) (10) > King (K) > Ober (O) > Unter (U) > Nine (Neuner) (9) > Eight (Achter) (8) > Seven (Siebener) (7) > Six (Sechser) (6)

=== Values ===
The cards have the same point values as in Schafkopf. The 10, with ten card points, is just below the Ace (11 points), but above the King (4), Ober (3) and Unter (2). The value of the Spatzen ("sparrows" – 9 to 6) lies only in their ability to take tricks, draw trumps or other cards during play, but they have no intrinsic point value.

Ranks and card-point values of cards
Rank	A	10	K	O	U	9	8	7	6
Value	11	10	4	3	2	–			

=== Trumps ===
In the original game, Hearts may always have been trumps. In the later variant, Hearts was normally the permanent trump suit in the lowest contract, known as a Frage, in which the scat could be picked up and exchanged with. However, it was only a suit of preference in Solo contracts, i.e. a Heart Solo outranked a Solo in another suit.

== German Tarok (c. 1760s–1830s) ==
The only account of the original game is a few sketchy remarks in the forward of the 1839 treatise, Das Sansprendre-Spiel in Regeln zur richtigen Auffassung und Ausführung desselben nach seinen verschiedenen Nuancen dargestellt (SSR). Although this original form of German Tarok differed "in only a few points" from its successor, Sansprendre, it was "quite different from it in execution." It was played with 36 German-suited cards, each player receiving 11, the remaining 3 belonging to the dealer. (Note: Presumably he could pick them up and discard 3 cards to bring his hand to 11.) It is likely that Hearts was a permanent trump suit, replacing the role of the tarocks in Grosstarock. It was an ace–ten game in which the player with the most points won.

== Sansprendre ==
The first rules for a new form of German Tarok, initially called Sansprendre, were published in the same treatise, SSR, together with extensive tactical guidance. The author opens by comparing Sansprendre to the original German Tarok saying "It is not easy to find a game played with German-suited cards which gives as much interest as Sansprendre; a variant of German Tarok, although quite different from it in execution" and that "anyone who has played [Sansprendre]... is unlikely to return to Tarok; because, in comparison, it appears to him very simple and without interest."

=== Aim ===
The aim is to score 61 or more points per game as the declarer. The defenders aim to prevent this.

=== Deal ===
The game is for three or four players. If four play, there are only three active players; the dealer is called the 'king' and does not participate. To decide seating, cards of differing suits are placed by each seat and players draw from cards with the same suits, sitting at the place where the suit of the card is corresponding to that of the one they drew.

Usually two 36-card German-suited 'Tarok' packs are used, the second being pre-shuffled ready for the next dealer. The first dealer is the player who drew Hearts. He shuffles, offers the pack to the right for cutting and places the top 3 cards as a scat, face down on the table. The dealer then deals a packet of 4 cards each, beginning with forehand to the left, followed by two more packets of 3 and 4 cards each, so that every player has 11 cards.

=== Auction ===
There is a single round of bidding with immediate hold. Players may bid for any of 4 contracts which are shown in ascending order below:

Sansprendre
Name of contract	Exchange with scat	Suits	Tariff
Frage	Yes	♣, ♠ or ♦	x 1
Frage in Couleur	Yes	♥ only	x 2
Sansprendre	No	♣, ♠ or ♦	x 3
Sansprendre in Couleur	No	♥ only	x 4

Beginning with forehand, players may announce "pass" or make a bid. Once a bid has been announced, subsequent players must accept it by saying "good" or overcall it. If overcalled, the earlier bidder must accept it or hold it. If a Frage or Sansprendre has been bid, a later player may ask "is it in Couleur?" i.e. in Hearts, but if the reply is "no", the later player must then play in Hearts. The highest bidder wins the auction and becomes the declarer. In a Frage, the declarer exchanges 3 cards with the scat; these may not be Aces unless the entire suit is held. The declarer names trumps unless a Heart Solo was named, in which case it is obvious. Players may agree that a Tout (i.e. slam) may be announced after the auction has been decided.

=== Play ===
Play is clockwise and forehand leads. Players must follow suit if able, trump if unable to follow, otherwise they may play any card. The trick is won by the highest trump, unless none are played, in which case the highest card of the led suit wins. The trick winner leads to the next.

=== Settlement ===
The declarer requires 61 to win and is paid for each card point in excess of 60. If he loses, he pays for each point below 60. There is normally no payment for a draw (60–60). A tariff per point is agreed beforehand at, say, 1 point = 1 pfennig. This tariff is then multiplied as per the table above.

In addition, Sansprendre may be played:

- Without a pot. Payments are then made from the players' own pockets. If the game is won, the declarer is paid according to the number of overshoot points (points over 60) by each defender; if it is lost, the declarer pays a sum to each defender according to the number of undershoot points (points under 60). For example, if the declarer wins a Sansprendre with 82 points, the defenders each pay 22 × 3 = 66 pf to the declarer. If a Frage in Couleur is lost with 41 points, the declarer pays each defender 19 × 2 = 36 pf.
- With a pot (Boule). Each player antes a stake in the first game and whenever the pot requires refilling. Otherwise only the dealer antes a stake before each deal. Payments for overshoot and undershoot points are paid from the pocket. However, when a Sansprendre is won, the declarer also sweeps the pot; when it is lost, the declarer doubles the pot. A pot limit may be agreed.

== German Tarok (c. 1850–1918) ==
By 1851, the game has adopted the name of its predecessor, German Tarok. Further, mainly cosmetic, changes appear in the 1880s. In the most detailed account Ausführliche Anleitung zum Deutschtarokspielen (AAD, 1881), French terminology has been abandoned and more elaborate payment schemes were described. The following rules are based on AAD and show the main changes from the rules for Sansprendre above.

=== Deal ===
All is as in Sansprendre, except that there is an alternative method for choosing the dealer: to shuffle and fan the pack, face down. Players draw a card, and the one with the lowest deals first. French packs are said to be used in "several places."

=== Auction ===
Once again, there is a single round of bidding with immediate hold, but this time only three contracts; the ordinary suit Frage has been dropped. Frage in Couleur is renamed Frage, a Sansprendre is now a Solo, and a Sansprendre in Couleur is now a Herzsolo. (Note: Schmidt (1851) uses the terms Roth-Solo or Couleur-Solo for a Heart Solo, but Herzsolo is used in AAD (1881) and TSP (1889).) In each case, the card points in the scat belong to the declarer. A Frage may only be played in Hearts; to bid this a player may either say "Frage" or "I'll play" (ich spiele). A second bidder may overcall this with "I'll play better" (ich spiele besser), "I'll play too" (ich spiele auch) or "I'll play more" (ich spiele mehr). A third bidder may announce "I'll play even better" (ich spiele noch besser) or "I'll play (the) best." (ich spiele am Besten). (Note: The reason for this cryptic speech is to minimise the amount of information revealed about a player's hand.) A player who is overcalled and wants to hold the higher bid announces "I'll play [it] myself" (ich spiele selbst). (Note: "I'll play best" and "I'll play it myself" both come from TSP, q.v.)

German Tarok
Name of contract	Exchange with scat	Suits	Tariff
Frage	Yes	♥ only	x 2
Solo	No	♣, ♠ or ♦	x 3
Herzsolo	No	♥ only	x 4

An announcement to take all tricks is a Matsch ("mudslide"). (Note: The alternative names of Tout ("all"), Mord ("murder") and Vole ("robbery") are mentioned in passing.) Players bidding a Solo in a suit other than Hearts must not name trumps until the auction is over. A Frage player who is done with the scat announces "I'm ready" (es liegt). Aces may now be laid away in the scat. Otherwise bidding is as in Sansprendre.

=== Play ===
As in Sansprendre.

=== Settlement ===
Four payment schemes are described:

- Hand payments. As in Sansprendre.
- Common pot. Payments are slightly different from SSR. Two or three marks are paid into the pot called a Laustiegel ("bug dish") or Hafen ("little jug"), out of which winnings are paid. Losses are paid from the declarer's pocket and divided between the two defenders. Thus the amount won or lost each time is half that of the first method.
- Blocks. An elaborate scheme involving counters called 'blocks', which are worth a fixed value. With four players (three active at any time), twelve blocks are placed in a cup and their value agreed at, say, 20 points = 20 pf. Before the first game, the dealer places one of the blocks in the pot. A successful Solo player earns the usual overshoot payment from each opponent and collects the block. In a tie, there is usually no payment. The next dealer adds a second block to the pot. If the Solo is lost, the declarer pays the defenders for undershoot points, but has to double the pot, so if there is one block in it, they add 20 pf. This penalty is known as a bête. If another Solo is lost, such that the pot already has a block plus the 20 pf bête, a new double bête of 40 pf is created and played for separately. Whenever such a double bête exists, a new one is created, these double stakes lining up on the table by the pot. The game continues until all the original blocks are won, a sequence of play known as a blockade. A session normally comprises 2 – 3 blockades. When playing with blocks, the Frage contract was often dropped entirely, a practice that the author of AAD calls "really regrettable" because in a Frage there is the skill of exchanging with the scat.
- Schreckensteiner. When playing with blocks, there could also be a second pot called the Schreckensteiner into which a tenth of the winnings were paid. This was intended to cover the cost of card money i.e. a fee charged by the hotel or pub for playing cards. Any surplus left over after the fee had been paid was played for at the end of the session by putting e.g. 40 pf at a time into the pot.

In "gentlemen's circles" the tariff was ½, 1 and 2 pf per point for the Frage, Solo and Herzsolo respectively "if one doesn't want to play for high stakes". AAD tells us, without explanation, that if ladies played, these rates are divided by two or four. A Matsch is worth 100 points if silent and 200 if announced. All these rates need to be agreed before play starts.

== Variations ==
AAD records two optional variations:

- Siebzig-Spiel ("Seventy Game"), which ranks between a Frage and a Solo. The declarer exchanges with the scat and names any suit as trumps, but has to score more than 70 points to win. It was paid as in a Frage and, in the block game, the winner claimed a block.
- Bismark (sic), which the dealer is forced to play if the others pass and where Frage is not permitted. The dealer calls for a card from the opponents and gives up any held card in exchange. Of course, if the card lies in the scat, the dealer is unlucky.

TSP, a shorter treatise published from 1881 to 1910 in several editions and entitled Tarok (Sans prendre), largely follows AAD but mentions two different variations:

- Rufen ("calling"), whereby a Matsch player may call for a card not held
- Siebziger-Solo, presumably the highest ranking bid in which a Solo player has to score 71 to win.

== Descendants ==
The family of games descended from German Tarok includes Bavarian Tarock, Swabian Tapp, Mexican Rana and the American games of Frog and Solo, also called Six-Bid, Slough or Sluff, as well as the Austrian game of Bauerntarock.

== Bibliography ==
- _ (1811). Magazin für die Handlung, Handelsgesetzgebung und Finanzverwaltung, Volume 2. p. 191.
- _ (1839). Das Sansprendre-Spiel in Regeln zur richtigen Auffassung und Ausführung desselben nach seinen verschiedenen Nuancen dargestellt (SSR). Bayreuth: Grau 50 pp.
- _ (1872). Karten-Spiel-Tarif. Würzburg: Stahel.
- _ (1881). Ausführliche Anleitung zum Deutschtarokspielen, nebst einem Anhange, enthaltend: ein Verzeichniß über alle technischen oder Kunstausdrücke, Provinzialismen und vulgären Bezeichnungen, welche bei diesem Spiele vorkommen (AAD). Munich: Cäsar Fritsch. 88 pp.
- _ (1889). Tarok (Sans prendre): Gründliche und praktische Anleitung zu diesem beliebten Kartenspiele auf Grund vieljähriger Übung zusammengestellt von einem erfahrenen Spieler (TSP). 3rd edn. Munich: Dr. Wildsch. 17 pp.
- _ (1891). Tarok (Sans prendre): Gründliche und praktische Anleitung zu diesem beliebten Kartenspiele auf Grund vieljähriger Übung zusammengestellt von einem erfahrenen Spieler (TSP). 5th edn. Munich: Dr. Wildsch. 18 pp.
- Bing, Michael (1879). Michael Bing, zur Erinnerung für seine Freunde. Frankfurt: C. Adelmann.
- Byr, Robert (1872). Auf abschüssiger Bahn, Vol. 1. Berlin: Graetz.
- Dummett, Michael (1980). The game of Tarot : from Ferrara to Salt Lake City. London: Duckworth. ISBN 0-7156-1014-7. OCLC 7275570.
- Eaton, Paul (2022). "German Tarok – Part 1: the Missing Link 'Bavarian Tarock and its Relatives'" in The Playing-Card, Vol. 50, No. 3. ISSN 1752-671X pp. 112–122.
- Feist, H. (1880). Erinnerungsblätter an die Sänger-Abende im Nürnberger Singverein, Volume 1, Issues 1-10. Nuremberg: Bieling.
- Hausler, Manfred (2016). Trommler und Pfeife. Revised edn. (1st edn. 2010) Munich: Volk. ISBN 978-3-937200-89-7
- Illerfeld Lupin, Friedrich Freiherr von und auf (1847). Selbstbiographie. 2nd edn., Vol. 1, p. 327.
- Kinzl, Josef (1869). Chronik der Städte Krems, Stein und deren nächster Umgegend. Krems: Max Pammer.
- Schmidt, J. St. (1851). Leitfaden zur richtigen Auffassung und Ausführung des Tarok-Spiels. Nuremberg: Schmidt. 50 pp.
- von Destouches, Joseph Anton (1809). Statistische Darstellung der Oberpfalz und ihrer Hauptstadt Amberg. p. 227.
- Ziersch, Walter (1927). "Ludwig Thoma spielt Tarock" in Tages-Post, Linz, 27 Feb 1927, pp. 1 ff.
