= Card player =

Person who participates in a card game

Card players are those participating in a card game. Various names are given to card players based on their role or position.

== Position ==
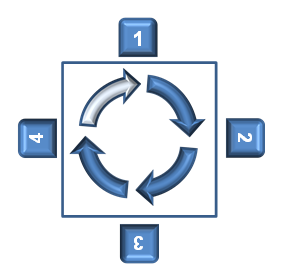
Bidding sequence in a four-player game of Schafkopf: 1 is Forehand and leads to the first trick; 2 is Middlehand; 3 is Rearhand and cuts the pack; 4 is Dealer

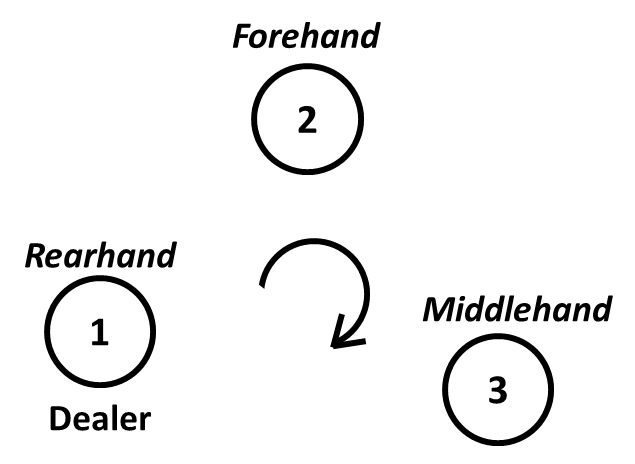
Forehand, middlehand and rearhand in a three-player game. This time rearhand is also the dealer.

=== Games of Anglo-American origin ===
In games of Anglo-American origin played in English-speaking countries, age refers to the order of priority in which players make the first lead, bid or bet, based on their position at the table. This changes constantly as the dealer rotates either clockwise or anticlockwise around the table. They are traditionally referred to as follows:

Eldest hand (or elder hand)
the player who enjoys greatest priority and e.g. is the first to receive cards in the deal. Elder is the non-dealer in two-hand games.

Youngest hand (or younger hand)
the player who has the lowest priority and who e.g. is the last to bid or play at the start of a game (often the dealer).

Pone
Also pony or poney. Short for "opponent". American or Old English term for non-dealer in some two-player games e.g. Colonel or the player on the dealer's right, who cuts the cards, e.g. in Vingt-Un (Note: Play being assumed to be left to right) i.e. youngest hand.

Alternatively the players are simply numbered as follows:

First hand
the player who leads to the first trick and who leads any bidding. Same as eldest hand or forehand.

Second hand
the player who bids or plays second.

Third hand
the player who bids or plays third.

Fourth hand
the player who bids or plays fourth.

=== Games of European origin ===
In games originating in Europe, the following terminology indicating the players' priority is used:

Forehand
the player who leads to the first trick and who leads any bidding. Same as eldest hand.

Middlehand
the player between forehand and rearhand in a three-person game. In Skat and similar 3-hand games, the second player in turn to bid. In four-hand games, middlehand is the player after forehand so the order is: forehand, middlehand, rearhand, dealer.

Rearhand
the player with least priority, e.g. the last to bid or play. Sometimes also called endhand.

== Roles ==
Players may also be referred to by their roles as follows:

Active player
a player who receives cards in the current deal and is not sitting out temporarily because a) there are more players than the game is designed for, or b) they have withdrawn due to poor cards
Adversary
an opponent (q.v.)
Captain
in certain team games, the player who collects information from his teammate(s) and directs the tactics.
Cutter
the player whose is entitled to cut the cards; usually the opposite side of the dealer to forehand (or eldest/elder hand).
Dealer
the person who distributes or deals the cards to players in a card game.
Declarer
the highest bidder, who declares and then strives to make good the stated contract.
Defender
a player who plays against the declarer, usually with other defenders.
King
in games where there is one player more than the rules permit, players take turns at being 'king', usually dealing and then sitting out. A king may or may not score points with the other players. A common practice in German games, but also found in e.g. American six-bid solo. In Low German the King was also called a Stillsitter, for example in Ombre whereby the fourth player, in turn, did not play but paid (or was paid).

Opponent
a player of the opposing side; a defender (q.v); or any other player in a round game.
Partner
a player who plays co-operatively in a team and who shares the winnings or losses. Partnerships may be fixed for the whole session or vary from deal to deal.
Pitcher
in games like Phat and Pitch, a player who establishes trumps in leading to the first trick.
Soloist
a player who plays a Solo game, i.e. plays alone, as the declarer, against 2 or more other defenders.

In partnership games there may be a:

Declaring team or declaring side
the declarer's team or side
Defending team or defending side
the team or side opposing the declarer and declarer's partner

== Dealing ==
=== Choice of dealer ===
In most card games, the role of dealer rotates, either clockwise or anticlockwise. The first dealer may be decided in one of several ways:

- The youngest player is invited to deal first
- The first dealer is chosen by lot i.e. players draw cards from a shuffled pack and the player with the highest card deals first (e.g. Schafkopf, Poker)
- The first dealer is chosen by lot i.e. players draw cards from a shuffled pack and the player with the lowest card deals first (e.g. Whist)

In casinos, the dealer is always the house banker for obvious reasons.

=== Distribution ===
The distribution of the cards is conducted by the dealer in accordance with the game rules. The dealer may deal the cards one at a time, or in groups or packets, as indicated by the rules. In some games, all cards are dealt, while in other versions, some cards are left undistributed and are placed – or stacked – in the centre of the table as a talon or widow. The cards distributed to a player are known as the player's "hand".

Normally the dealer shuffles the cards and then hands the pack to a player to cut it, who then lifts at least three cards from the pack. In games where the deal is clockwise, this player will be on the right of the dealer; however, if the deal is anti-clockwise, this player is on the left of the dealer. The dealer generally distributes cards to each player individually or in packets in the direction of play, beginning with eldest hand, also known as forehand. The cards are dealt face-down in front of the players, and the dealer places any left-over cards face-down in the centre of the table.

=== Other duties ===
The duties of a dealer differ from game to game. Their job usually involves distributing cards for games such as poker, contract bridge, blackjack, roulette or skat but may also involve other duties, for example:

- Contract bridge: the dealer is an opener who opens the auction and makes the first call, after which the auction progresses clockwise.
- In poker, the dealer controls the action during a hand and manages the pot.
- In blackjack, a player plays against a dealer, or "house". If the hand of a player is closer to 21 than the dealer's, without going over, the player wins.
- In a three-player skat game, the dealer takes on the role of rearhand. The player sitting on the left of the dealer is called the "forehand", and the player sitting to the dealer's right is called middlehand.

=== Casino dealers ===
Casino dealers must have a comprehensive and accurate knowledge of the games for which they deal. They should know the rules of the different card games, understand the odds of winning in various situations, and they must be able to communicate this information correctly to all levels of players. It is also the responsibility of the dealer to watch the play carefully and check to make sure that no one is cheating.

== See also ==
- Glossary of card game terms

== Literature ==
- Foster, Robert Frederick (1897). Foster's Complete Hoyle (3rd ed.). New York and London: Frederick A. Stokes.
- Jones, Charles, ed. (1800). Hoyle's Games Improved. London: Ritchie.
- Phillips, Hubert, ed. (1957). Culbertson's Card Games Complete. Watford: Arco.
- Schütze, Johann Friedrich (1800). Holsteinisches Idiotikon. Hamburg: Heinrich Ludwig Villaume.
