= Talon (cards) =

Stack of undealt cards

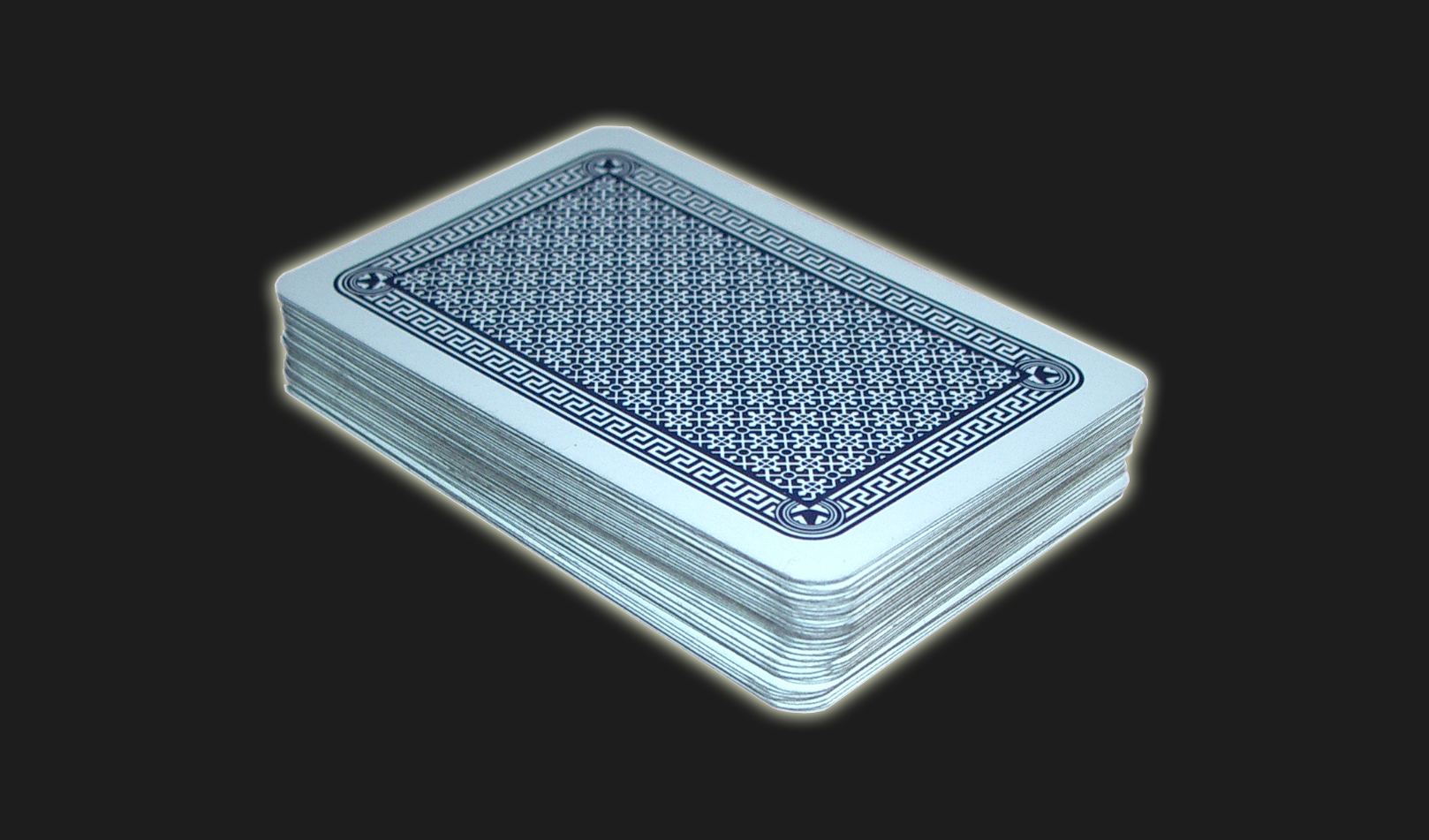
A talon of playing cards (face down)

In card games, a talon ([taˈlɔ̃]; French for "heel") is a stack of undealt cards that is placed on the table to be used during the game. Depending on the game or region, they may also be referred to as the blind, kitty, skat, stock, tapp or widow (US).

== Description ==
In 1909, Meyers Lexicon described the talon as "the cards left over after dealing..." In games of chance, such as Pharo, it is "the stock of cards which the banker draws on". The talon is usually a pack of cards, placed face down, in the middle of the card table. In other games, there are however very different variations, for example in Königrufen, talons may be placed face up or face down.

Parlett describes a kitty as "the pool or pot being played for" or "a dead hand or widow". He also equates talon to stock as the "cards which are not dealt initially but may be drawn from or dealt out later in the play".

== Examples of usage ==
The following are examples of games and the term usually used for talon. They are taken from Parlett unless otherwise indicated:

- Blind: Auction Euchre, Cego, Frog, Sheepshead, Six-Bid
- Cego: Cego
- Dabb: Binokel, Tapp, Tappen
- Doaba: Jaggln
- Dobb: Dobbm
- Kitty: Bid Whist, Five-Card Brag, Five Hundred, Newmarket, Three-Card Brag, Crash, Sergeant-Major
- Pott: Tausendundeins
- Skat: Admirals' Skat, Fipsen, North American Skat, Ramsch, Schieberamsch, Skat
- Start: Tausendundeins, Wallachen
- Stock: Bavarian Tarock, Belote, Bezique, Bisca, Bondtolva, Bourre, Briscola, California Jack, Canasta, Coinche, Crazy Eights, Cuarenta, Durak, Écarté, Eleusis, Gleek, Hand and Foot, Tausendundeins, Klaberjass, Klondike, Marjolet, Ristiklappi, Rummy, Sixty-Six, Skitgubbe, Toepen, Tute
- Stoß: German Rummy
- Talon: Bauernschnapsen, Binokel, Bohemian Schneider, Droggn, Écarté, Elfern, Gaigel, German Rummy, Guinguette, Hungarian Tarock, Illustrated Tarock, Königrufen, Mau-Mau, Mariás, Mauscheln, Mizerka, Nain Jaune, Piquet, Préférence, Preference, Russian Bank, Schnapsen, Sixty-Six, Treppenrommé, Ulti
- Tapp: Binokel, Cego, Tapp, Tapp Tarock, Troggu
- Widow: (Note: Dummett (1980), p. 570, confirms that this is an American expression, something reflected in the games that use the term.) Army and Navy Pinochle, Auction Euchre, Auction Manille, Auction Pinochle, Frog, Smear, Widow Cinch, Widow Hearts, Widow Nap/Sir Garnet, Widow Pinochle

== See also ==
- Glossary of card game terms

== Literature ==
- Dummett, Sir Michael (1980). The Game of Tarot. London: Duckworth. ISBN 0715631225
- Kastner, Hugo; Folkvord, Gerald Kador (2005). Die große Humboldt-Enzyklopädie der Kartenspiele. Baden-Baden: Humboldt. ISBN 978-3-89994-058-9.
- Rohrmayer, Erich (2015). Lerne Wallachen. Amberg: Buch- und Kunstverlag Oberpfalz. ISBN 978-3-95587-023-2.
