= Bidding (cards) =

Card game procedure

Bidding is the process in many card games, such as Skat, Pinochle, Binokel, Bridge, Solo Whist, Préférence, L’Hombre, Bauernschnapsen and most types of Tarock, whereby players compete to be able to specify the type of contract, the trump cards and/or to be able to pick up a set of face-down cards known variously, for example, as the talon, skat, dabb.

Bidding is one of only two major innovations to traditional trick-taking games since they were invented; the other being the idea of a trump suit. The concept of bidding comes from the game known in Spain as Tresillo and elsewhere as Ombre or L'Hombre. Ombre emerged in Spain between 1600 and 1650 from the Spanish variant of Triomphe (Triumphus Hispanicus).

== Overview ==
Players may raise the bid (by bidding a higher contract or point value) until the highest bidder is determined when the others all say "pass." Naming a higher contract than an earlier player is known as outbidding or overcalling. By contrast, if a player bids higher than allowed by the rules or higher than the strength of his hand can reasonably sustain, this is overbidding and usually has negative consequences, often involving the loss of the game. However, overbidding in Bridge may be used as a tactical manoeuvre in order to prevent the opponents playing a high value game.

Bidding may be done in successive pairs as in Skat (in the sequence: deal - listen - announce - reply) or Schafkopf, known as bidding and holding, or in strict rotation as in Euchre and Königrufen. Bidding may be limited to one round, or it may be permissible for bidding to go around more than once.

== Bidding methods ==
Dummett and McLeod defined four common methods of bidding or "bidding procedures", cited below in addition to other methods.

=== Single round bidding ===
In single round bidding, players get one chance either to pass or to name the bid they wish to play. There is no holding and no raising; it is essentially 'one round, one bid'.

=== Bidding with immediate hold ===
In "bidding with immediate hold" there is also only one round of bidding. This time, however, an earlier player must immediately hold or fold if a later player names a higher bid. If the first holds, the second player may raise the bid and this continues until one or other folds. While the pair are alternately bidding and holding, no-one else may bid. Once one of the pair folds, the next player in turn may pass or outbid the survivor and, again, they continue until one drops out. In essence this is 'one round, bid and hold' or 'bidding and holding in pairs' with the bidding being conducted by successive pairs of players.

=== Bidding with immediate escalation ===
In "bidding with immediate escalation", there is one round of bidding. An earlier player must immediately overcall or pass if a later player names a higher bid. Holding is not permitted. The two players raise alternately until one passes whereupon the next player enters the bidding by passing or raising further. This is 'one round, bid and raise' or 'bidding and raising in pairs' with the bidding being conducted by successive pairs of players.

=== Bidding with delayed hold ===
In "bidding with delayed hold" players bid, pass or hold in strict rotation and there is usually more than one round of bidding. If a player is outbid and wants to hold, they must wait until their turn comes around again before holding. A player who has passed, does not speak again. This is 'multi-round, bid and hold'.

=== Bidding by escalation ===
In "bidding by escalation" players pass or bid in rotation and there can be more than one round of bidding. However, there is no holding so the bids simply escalate as bidding goes around the table. In effect this is 'multi-round, bid and raise'.

=== Jump bidding ===
In some games, players must start with the lowest legal bid and then raise them one step at a time. In jump bidding, players may 'jump' over intermediate contracts straight to a higher one. This may be combined with any of the above methods.

=== Other methods ===
Dummett and McLeod note that there are bidding procedures or variations which, for example, mandate that forehand always bids or that the dealer must become the declarer if all others pass.

== Literature ==
- Depaulis, Thierry (1987). "Un Peu de Lumiére sur L'hombre (3)" in The Playing-Card XVI (2), November 1987. ISSN 0305-2133. pp. 44–53.
- Dummett, Sir Michael (1980). The Game of Tarot. London: Duckworth.
- Dummett, Sir Michael and John McLeod (2004). A History of Games Played with the Tarot Pack. Vol. 2. Lewiston: Edwin Mellon Press.
