= Animal Tarot =

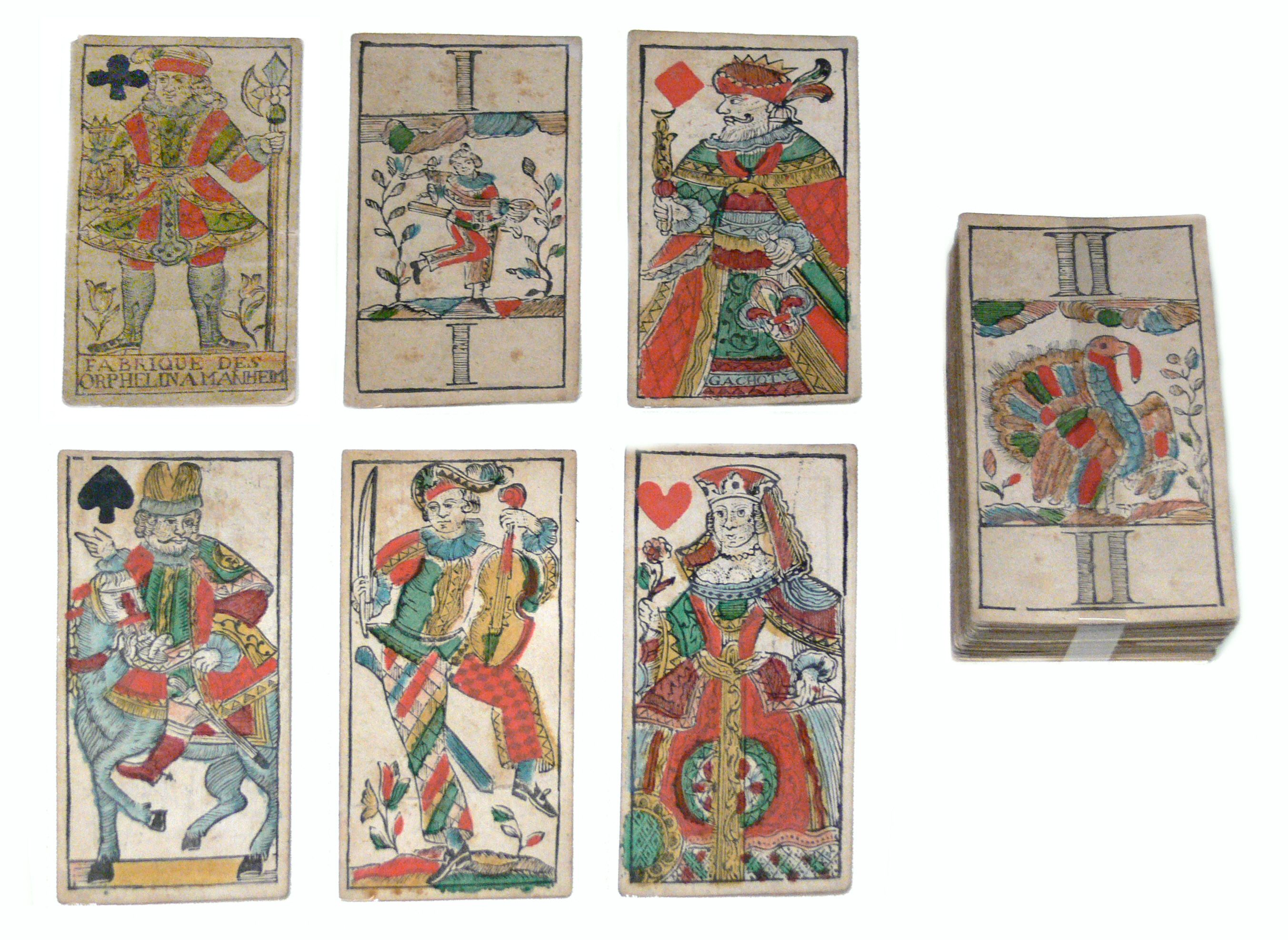
18th-century Russian Animal Tarot made in Mannheim

Animal Tarot (German: Tiertarock) is a genre of tarot decks used for playing card games that were most commonly found in northern Europe, from Belgium to Russia, only one of which has survived: the Adler Cego pattern in south Germany. A theme of animals, real and/or fantastic, replaces the traditional trump scenes found in the Italian-suited tarot packs such as the Tarot of Besançon. The Sküs plays a musical instrument while the Pagat is represented by Hans Wurst, a carnival stock character who carries his sausage, drink, slap stick, or hat. They constitute the first generation of French-suited tarot patterns. Prior to their introduction, tarot card games had been confined to Italy, France, and Switzerland. During the 17th century, the game's popularity in these three countries declined and was forgotten in many regions. The rapid expansion of the game into the Holy Roman Empire and Scandinavia after the appearance of animal tarots may not be a coincidence. In the 19th century, most animal tarots were replaced with tarots that have genre scenes, veduta, opera, architectural or ethnological motifs on the trumps such as the Austro-Hungarian Industrie und Glück and the Franco-German Bourgeois Tarot.

== History ==
=== Precursors ===
Early hunting decks, like the Stuttgart pack and Ambraser Hofjagdspiel, known to display wildlife as suits, date back to the second quarter of the fifteenth century. The contemporary da Tortona deck, one of the first trionfi, a predecessor of tarot, includes its trump set within its suits, depicting four types of birds. The Boiardo–Viti tarot, from the latter half of the same century, features a specific animal at the bottom of each trump. The sixteenth trump of the Sola Busca deck, composed around the end of the century, shows a small creature on its bottom-right corner.

=== Single-figured ===
After being introduced from Alsace, Besançon-pattern tarots were made in Germany as early as the 1720s but were probably not popular as German rule books did not mention tarot until after 1750.

==== Original Animal Tarot ====
The earliest animal tarots, utilizing Lyonnais face cards, were made around 1740 in Strasbourg with production also in Germany, Belgium, and Sweden up to the early 19th century. The animal trumps of this early pattern were copied by later makers but the motifs were often in different orders on the tarot cards.

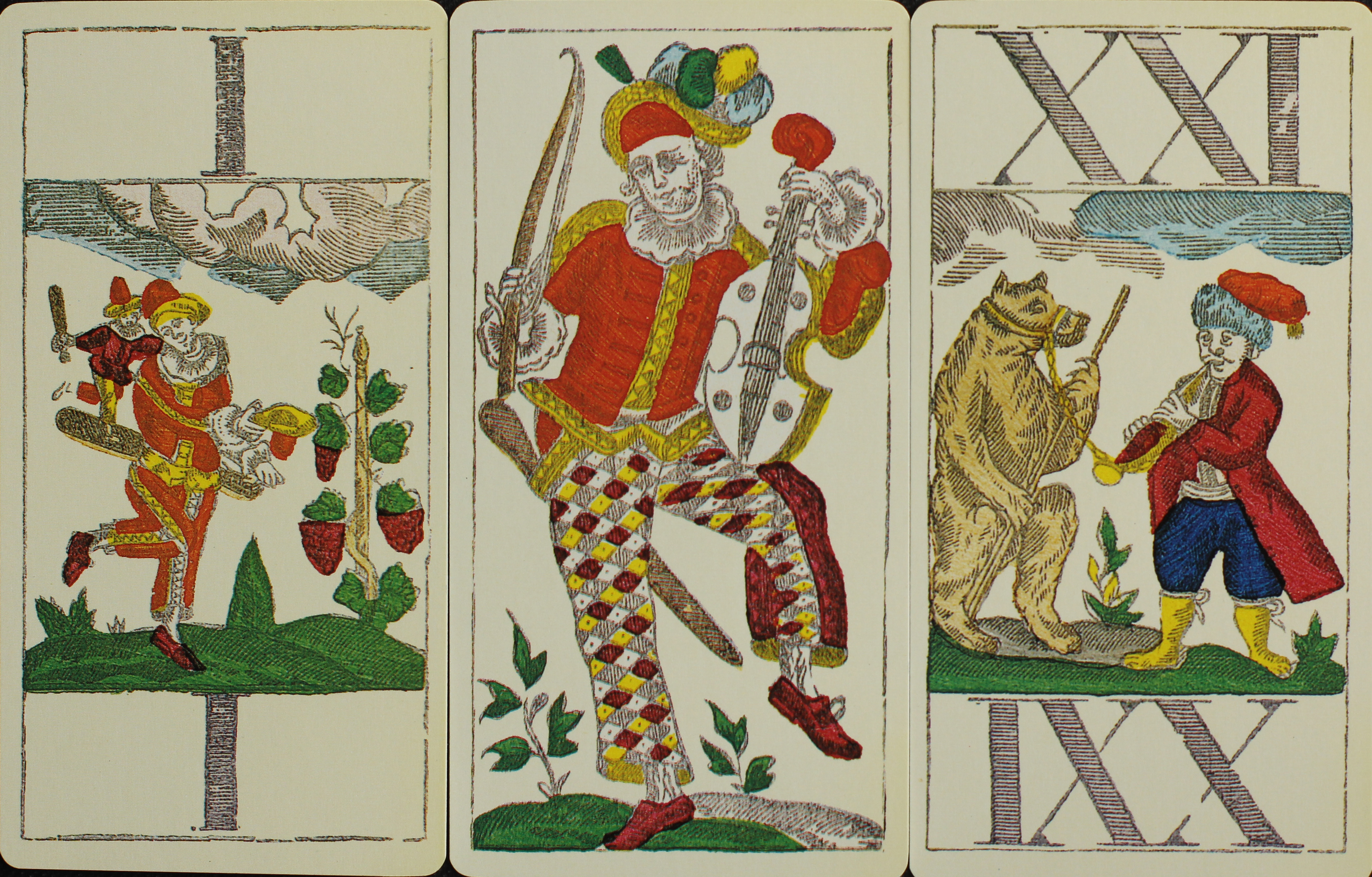
Bavarian Animal Tarot

==== Bavarian Animal Tarot ====
The Bavarian Animal Tarot was designed by Andreas Benedict Göbl of Munich, Bavaria around 1765. He replaced the Lyonnais face cards with the Bavarian version of the Paris pattern. Meanwhile the tarocks depicted various animals, some accompanied by a person; these appear to be taken from a generic set of designs which were then used in different orders on the various tarocks. The pattern was widely copied; examples being known from Alsace, Belgium, Luxembourg, Sweden, Denmark and Russia as well as other German states. Despite being the most widespread animal tarot, it died out in the early 19th century. The pack is only known in the 78-card form.

A facsimile of the Russian version has been published by Piatnik.

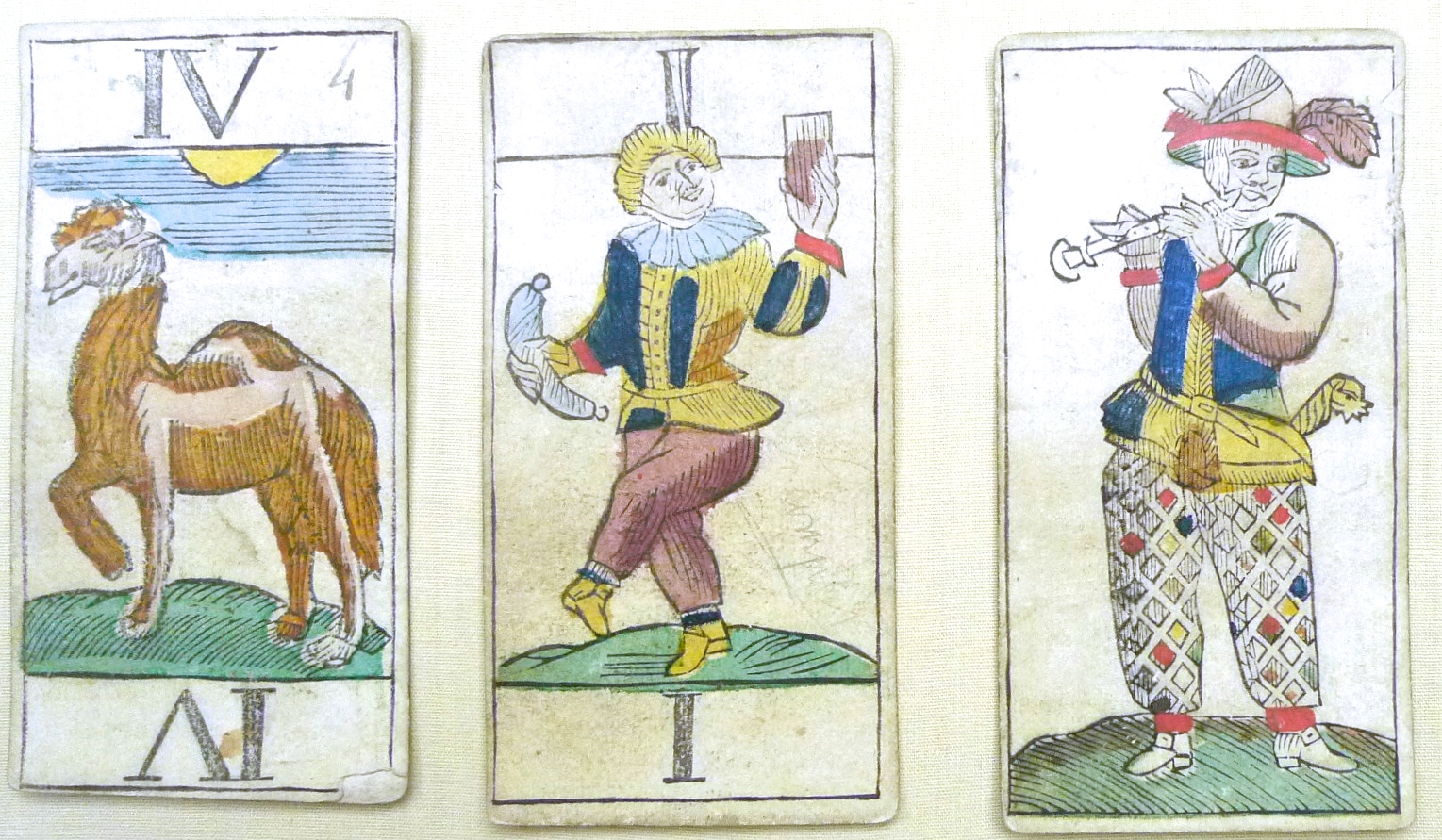
Belgian Animal Tarot

==== Belgian Animal Tarot ====
The Belgian Animal Tarot has the same trumps as the Bavarian one above but with unique court cards such as the queens and shin-exposed kings draped in cloaks. Animal Tarot cards, following the “Lyonnais” version were made in Liège as early as 1753 – so quite early —, and it is probable that the Brussels cardmakers were inspired by it to set up their own design. An early example is that made by Sarton Frères et Sœurs, in Brussels, around 1755. This new design became very successful, as we know of similar tarot packs made by Galler, Biot, Demoulin, all cardmakers in Brussels. In 1772, the Hannoversche Anzeigen of 30 November 1772 had an announcement for “Extra feine Brüsseler Tarokcharten“ (super-fine Brussels tarot cards), which says enough where this type of cards came from. The Belgian Animal Tarot is only known in the 78-card version. In Belgium, this kind of tarot cards were made until the late 19th century, particularly in Bruges by Daveluy.

It should not be confused with the Italian-suited Belgian Tarot which appeared in the Prince-Bishopric of Liège by 1693 and died out at the beginning of the 19th century.

=== Double-figured ===
Around 1800, newer patterns were introduced using reversible ('double-figured' or 'double-ended') courts and trumps. The Upper Austrian Tarot, Tyrolean, Baltic, and Adler Cego decks all share similar court designs, being double-figured (or double-ended) versions of the Bavarian Paris pattern.

==== Adler Cego ====
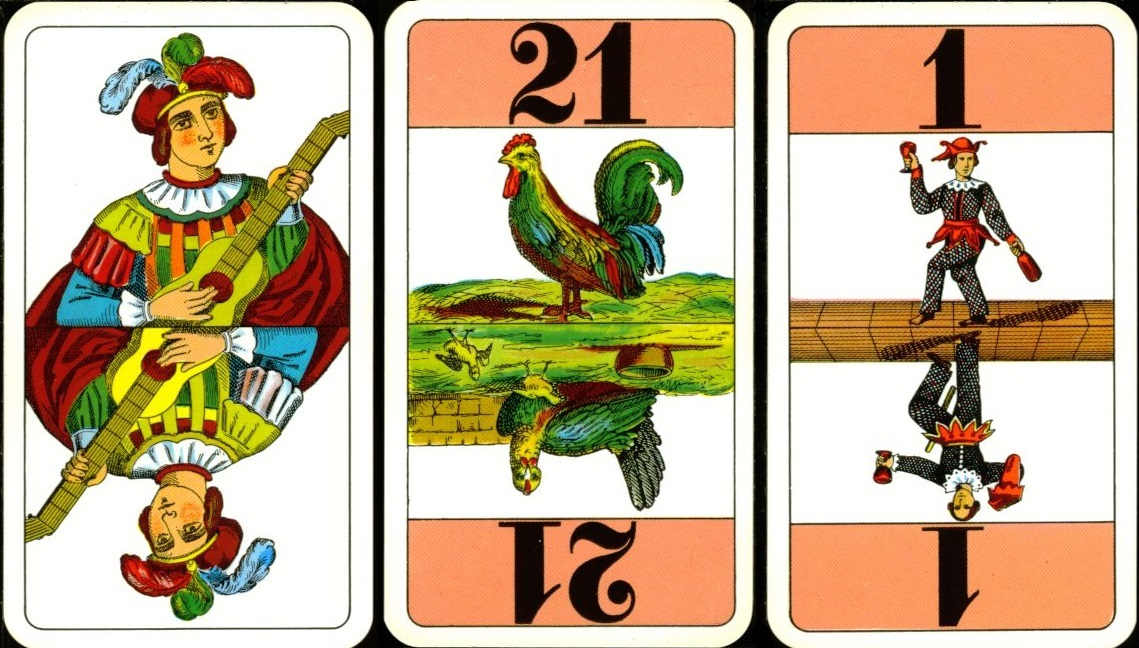
Adler Cego cards

A 78-card pack dating to around 1820 shows the same design of tarocks as those still produced today, however, the courts are of a different pattern. Although labelled "Cego Animal Tarock" by Christie's, it may have been a standard pack for tarock games since Cego is not known to have been played with 78 cards.

At some time during the 19th century, possibly in the 1840s, a second style of courts was incorporated from another early design; this is called Pattern F200 or XP8 by the International Playing-Card Society. F200 is one of a range of 'expatriate pattern' French-suited cards and was first observed in the early 19th century.

In 1852, packs of playing cards were being sold "at a cheap price" by a restaurateur in Karlsruhe as "Zego (Tarrok)" cards. It is not known whether these were of the Animal Tarot type or another pattern that preceded the emergence of C.L. Wüst's Encyclopaedic Tarot in 1865 which is ancestral to Bourgeois Tarot, the other pattern used today for playing Cego.

In 1879–1882, Lennhoff & Heuser of Frankfurt produced the first packs known as "Adler Cego", the name apparently derived from a small eagle, the crest of the city of Frankfurt, depicted on the Queen of Diamonds. (Note: Lennhoff & Hauser had started manufacturing cards in Frankfurt in 1850.) The firm was taken over by V.A.S.S. in 1882 who continue to produce the pack more or less unchanged today.

Adler Cego is one of only two tarot packs still manufactured in Germany, the other being of the Bourgeois Tarot pattern. Today it is only produced by ASS Altenburger who have been making it since 1882, giving the pack the designation "Adler-Cego Nr. 99" around 1931. It is the only animal tarot pattern still in common use, being played in the Black Forest region of southwest Germany. Like the Industrie und Glück pattern, it now consists of just 54 cards which include of 22 trumps, 16 face cards (images) and 16 pip cards (empty cards). Trump 1 shows the Kleiner Mann (based on Hans Wurst) while trump 2 has mythological hybrids. Trumps 3 to 21 depict real animals. The highest trump lacks the pink panels that the other trumps have on both ends of the cards depicting its rank in Arabic numerals. Instead, it shows a gleeman (wandering poet) and is called the Stieß or G'stieß (Fool). Despite the name (Adler means "eagle"), eagles do not appear in any of the cards.

Today, these 54-card Adler Cego packs are used in southwest Germany for playing the Baden national game of Cego, as well as the other regional games of Dreierles and Vier-Anderle.

==== Danish (Holmblad) Animal Tarot ====
The earliest French-suited animal "Tarok" pack manufactured in Denmark appeared in 1752 and was made by J.F. Mayer of Borregade to a design that may have been imported from Belgium. In 1783, Mayer's workshop was taken over by C.E. Süsz who joined forces with Kuntze to produce a second animal tarot pack based on the Bavarian pattern. These were produced until 1798. In the 1820s, Jacob Holmblad designed an entirely new, double-ended, animal tarot pack. This Danish Animal Tarot was crude to begin with, but the design quality improved considerably within the space of just a few years. This was the last animal tarot produced in Denmark; when Jacob died in 1837, and his son, Lauritz Peter, inherited the business, the animal tarot cards were replaced by images of Danish architecture.

==== Upper Austrian Animal Tarot ====
The earliest Upper Austrian Animal Tarot pack is dated to 1813 but little is known about the origins of the pattern other than the fact that it is clearly based on its Bavarian cousin, albeit the courts are "more austere in appearance". The pattern was also produced in Bohemia until 1858. It was made in both 78- and 54-card versions.

== See also ==
- French suited tarots
