= Cego =

Tarot card game

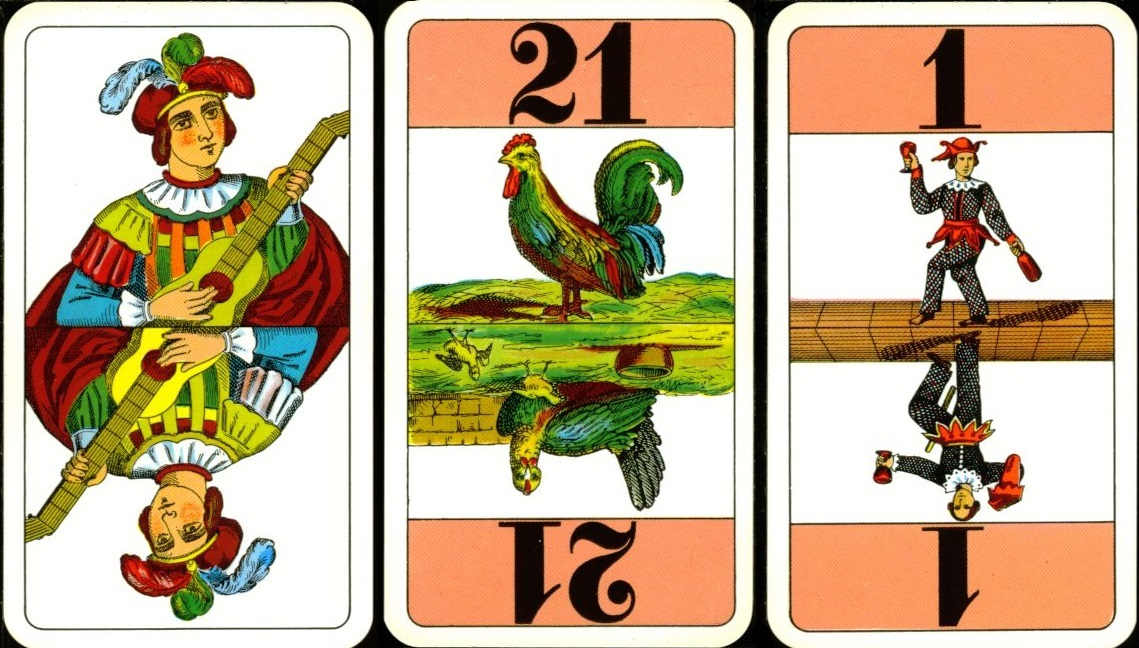
- The honour trumps
- Origin: Germany
- Alternative names: Baden Tarock, Cego-Tarock, Caeco, Ceco, Zeco, Zego, Zigo
- Type: Trick-taking
- Players: 3-4
- Skills: Tactics, Strategy
- Cards: 51 or 54
- Deck: Tarock
- Rank (high→low): Trumps: Stiess, 21-1; Black suits: K Q C J 10 9 8 7 Red suits: K Q C J 1 2 3 4
- Play: Anti-clockwise
- Playing time: 30 min.
- Chance: Moderate

Related games
- Tapp-Tarock • Königrufen • Zwanzigerrufen

Cego is a Tarot card game for three or four players played mainly in and around the Black Forest region of Germany. It was probably derived from the three-player Badenese game of Dreierles when soldiers deployed from the Iberian Peninsula during the Napoleonic Wars and, based on a Spanish game they had encountered, introduced Cego's distinctive feature: a concealed hand, or blind (Portuguese: cego). Cego has experienced a revival in recent years, being seen as part of the culture of the Black Forest and surrounding region. It has been called the national game of Baden and described as a "family classic".

== History and development ==
Sometimes called Baden Tarock (Note: German: Badisches Tarock) and, historically, also Zeco, Zego, Zigo, Caeco, Cäco and Ceco (Latin: caecus, meaning blind), Cego is seen as part of the cultural heritage of the Black Forest and Baden region.

After the defeat of Further Austria, in 1805 much of its territory was allocated to the Grand Duchy of Baden. During the ensuing Napoleonic Wars, soldiers from Baden deployed with Napoleon's troops to Spain where, among other things, they learnt a new card game, Ombre. Recent research suggests that they took elements of this game back to Baden and modified the Tarot game of Dreierles which was played with Tarock playing cards that were then still in popular use in southern Germany. The result was the game of Cego which became sufficiently popular to develop into the national game of Baden and Hohenzollern and these are the only regions of Germany where Tarot or Tarock cards are still used for playing games.

The military background to this is that, in 1808, the Grand Duchy of Baden was ordered by Napoleon to raise additional troops in the shape of a 1,733 strong regiment which was deployed for the following six years to the Iberian Peninsula under Major General Heinrich von Porbeck, where it fought at the Battles of Talavera and Vitoria as well as against Spanish guerrilleros. It suffered heavy casualties, only 500 soldiers returning to Baden by 1814. (Note: A detailed account of the Baden Regiment's deployment is given by von Weech in the Badische Neujahrsblätter of 1892.)

The first known mention of dedicated packs comes in 1852 when used Zego (Tarrok) cards are offered for sale "at a cheap price" by a restaurateur in Karlsruhe. The earliest full description of Cego's rules appears in 1860 in a treatise on Zigo which includes details of rules for 3 and 4 players as well as a song. Even at that early stage there were two Solo, two Gegensolo and several Zigo contracts, but no special games such as Piccolo or Bettel. As Zego it appears in 1868 in a Rhenish-Swabian poem about the game called Die Begischten. In 1901, Cego was reported to be one of the most popular penny ante games in the city of Pforzheim in Baden alongside Sixty-Six, Skat, Tapp and Tarrock (possibly Grosstarock or Dreierles).

In 1907 there were both 42- and 54-card versions and it was described as "especially popular in Baden". (Note: No rules for a 42-card game are known, but it is likely that it was a three-hand game in which 11 cards were dealt to each player and 9 to the blind; the Cego contracts being "with three", "with two", "two cards [of a suit]", "two odds", etc., since two cards would be needed from the hand cards to supplement the blind.) In 1909, Cego was described as "the most popular card game in Baden." In 1914, the Baden Landtag (government) banned the Gendarmerie from playing Cego "for disciplinary reasons".

A sketchy description of apparently simpler rules for Cego-Tarock, with just three contracts, is given by Robert Hülsemann in 1930. However, the first special contracts appear in print in 1950: Pikkolo, where the declarer must take exactly 1 trick, and Bettel, in which the declarer must not take any tricks. By 1960, however, the game had declined in popularity to such an extent that it was only found in "remote off-the-beaten-path localities" in Baden and Hohenzollern and played mainly by the elderly.

In 1967, a Ramsch contract appears; played when all pass, it is simply Räuber under a different name. No tariffs are given. The Cego bid of Half (Ein Halbe) only appears in online sources within the last decade and is not universal. The Ultimo contract, in which the sole aim is to take the last trick with the lowest trump and which is a constant feature of Tarot games since the earliest rules, does not appear in print until 2005 and is clearly a borrowing. John McLeod records the contract as Ulti in 1997 being played in Bräunlingen.

Cego's decline has been reversed in recent years as it has become seen as a traditional part of Baden and Black Forest culture. The game has grown organically and there are many regional variations but in recent years, the establishment of a Cego Black Forest Championship has led to official tournament rules being defined. In addition, regular courses and local tournaments are held and it is a permanent feature of Alemannic Week, held annually in the Black Forest at the end of September.

The noted German economist Gerold Blümle has researched, lectured, taught and written on the subject of "Baden's national game of Cego" and has done much to promote the game. Today, Cego is played mainly in the Upper Rhine valley, the Black Forest, the adjacent Baar lowland and around Lake Constance in Switzerland and Austria. A project to revive and promote the game and run live and online courses is being supported by Black Forest actor and cabaret artist, Martin Wangler. Cego courses are run in the autumn by the Dreisamtal and High Black Forest Colleges (Volkshochschule Dreisamtal and Volkshochschule Hochschwarzwald), regional folk high schools.

Cego was also recorded as being played in Switzerland on the border with Baden in the late 20th century.

== Pack ==
Cego traditionally uses a French-suited tarot pack of German design; two distinct patterns being still in use. In each case, the remaining cards (court and pip cards) are of the suits: Clubs, Spades, Hearts and Diamonds. In addition to the King, Queen, and Jack, there is also a Knight or Cavalier. Court cards cannot beat trumps, but are important because of their card value with respect to the total of points and their ability to win a suit trick. Pip cards have neither high card value nor are they very useful in winning tricks. Like the Austrian Industrie und Glück deck, the red pip cards are numbered from one to four (one being the highest card) and the black pip cards are numbered from ten to seven, with no corner indices.

=== Adler Cego pattern ===
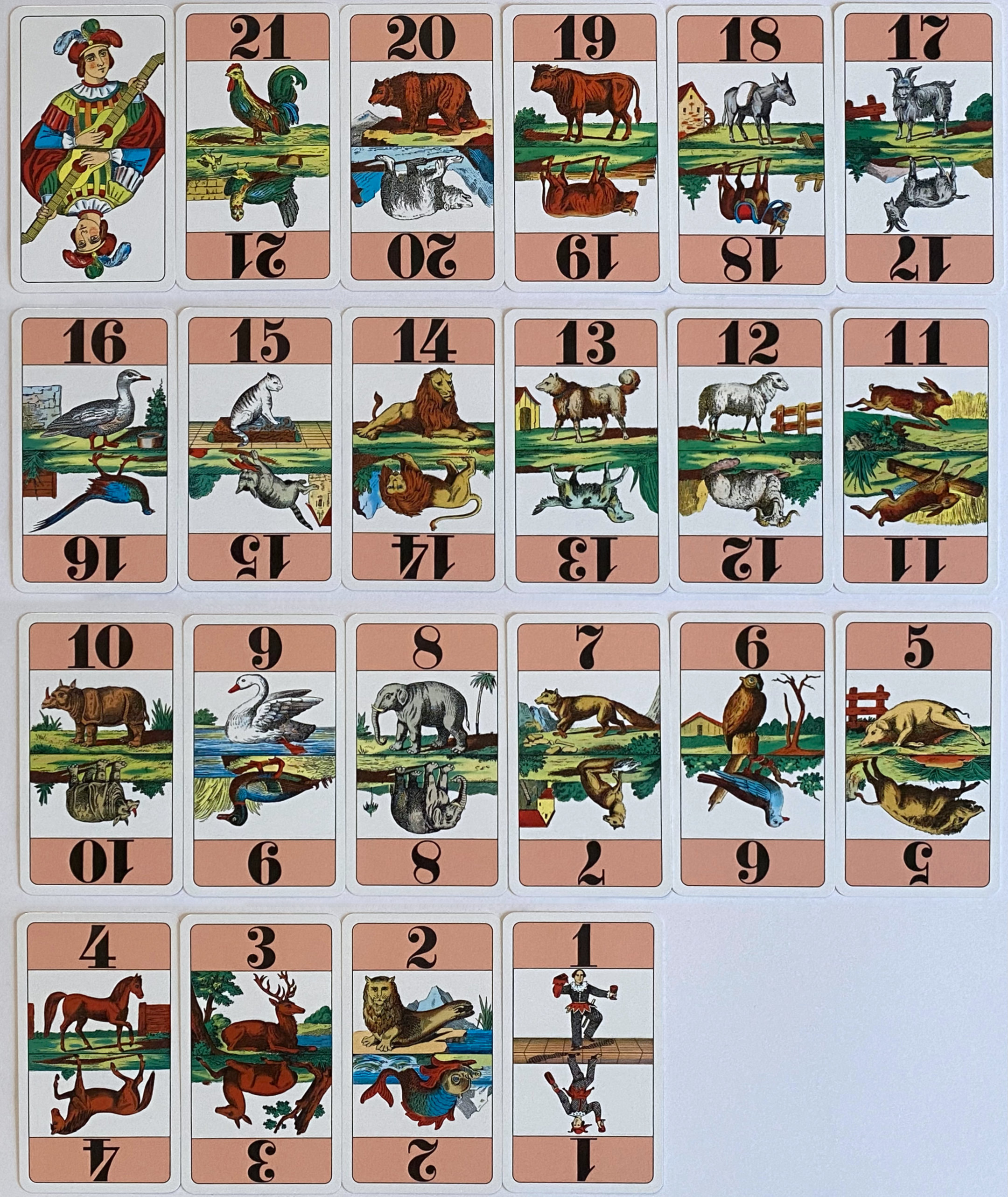
Adler Cego: all 22 trumps

The most common type of Cego pack still in production is an Animal Tarot deck that dates to the early 19th century. Although originally comprising 78 cards, it was shortened to 54 cards to play Cego. The name "Adler Cego" (Eagle Cego) was coined when shortened packs for the game were manufactured by Lennhoff & Heuser in 1879–1882 and referred to a small eagle printed on the ♦Q, the eagle being the symbol of the city of Frankfurt where the cards were made. The firm was sold to V.A.S.S. in 1882, who have continued to produce it, without the eagle, until the present day. Packs for Cego had been produced since at least 1852, but it is not known whether they were of the Animal Tarot type or another pattern that preceded the Encyclopaedic Tarot also used for Cego.

The shortened Animal Tarot pack comprises 22 trumps, 16 face cards (images) and 16 pip cards (empty cards). Trump 1 shows the Kleiner Mann ("Little Man", based on Hanswurst) but is typically called the Geiss ("nanny goat"), while trump 2 has mythological hybrids. Trumps 3 to 21 depict real animals. The highest trump lacks the pink panels that the other trumps have on both ends of the cards depicting its rank in Arabic numerals. Instead, it shows a gleeman and is called the Stiess, G'stiess or Geiger (fiddler or violinist, see also The Fool). Despite the name Adler, the former eagle symbol does not appear on any of the cards today. The last manufacturer of this deck is ASS Altenburger.

=== Bourgeois Tarot pattern ===
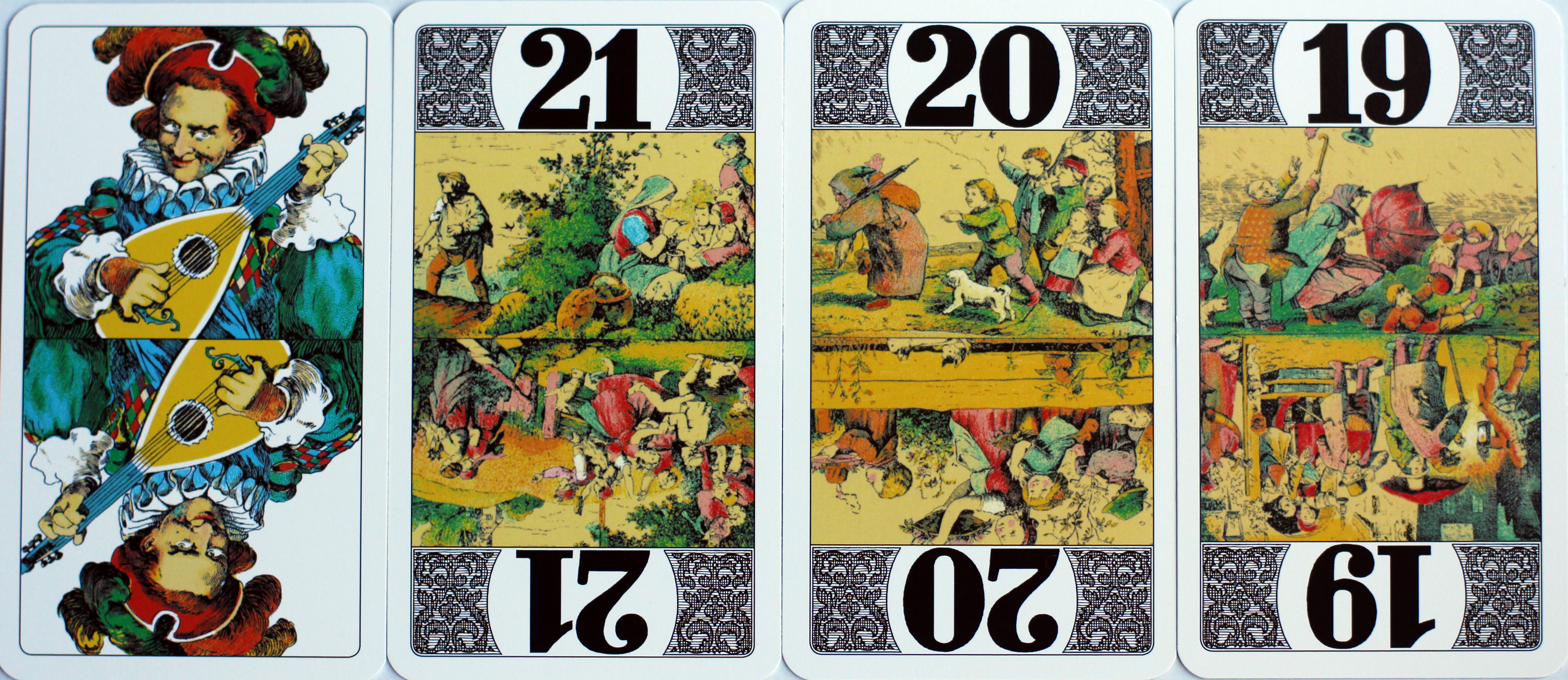
Bourgeois Tarot: the top 4 trumps

The second type of pack in current use is one originally produced by F.X. Schmid, again dating to the 19th century. This is a variant of the Bourgeois Tarot with genre scenes of rural and town life based on woodcuts by Ludwig Richter. The same pack was produced by Bielefelder Spielkarten from 1955 to 1974 and the pattern was also manufactured by A.S.S. In the 1970s, this was the most common pattern used for playing Cego, but more recently ASS have only released it through a couple of outlets. (Note: For example, Fahnen Staeb and the Fürstenberg Brewery.) It is sometimes called the Black Forest Cego pattern.

Another variant of Bourgeois Tarot, the French Tarot Nouveau deck, was also sometimes used, particularly in Alsace. When using a 78-card Tarot Nouveau deck, the Aces to sixes are removed from the blacks suits (Spades and Clubs) and the fives to tens are extracted from the red suits (Hearts and Diamonds). This then conforms to the 54-card pack needed for four-handed Cego.

=== Black Forest design ===
In late 2023, a new design was released. Designed by local graphics design artist, Anita Schwörer ("Fox"), it follows the Adler Cego concept, but replaces the court figures with images of people in local costume and the domestic and wild animals of the Adler Cego pack with animals native to the Black Forest, such as grouse, deer, badger, wild boar and squirrel.

=== Card names and values ===
Cards - names and values
Rank	Regional names	Point value
King	König, Kenig or Hanor	5 points
Queen	Dame or Gouvernante	4 points
Cavalier, Knight or Rider	Reiter or Cavall	3 points
Jack	Bube or Bueve	2 points
Fool or Excuse	Stiess, Gstiess, Giegemärti, or Geiger (fiddler, violinist)	5 points
Trump 21	Mund, Mun or Mond (moon); Gack (rooster) or Monde (world)	5 points
Trump 1	Pagat, Geiss (nanny goat), (Note: Geiss, spelt Geiß in German, is pronounced with a hard "g" and rhymes with "dice".) Kleiner Mann (little man), Kleiner Ma, Pfeif (pipe), Babber, Babberl, Babberle, Bäbberle, Babberli, Bagätli Batleur or Bachquakli	5 points
Remainder	Trucks, Drucks or Trocks (trumps or tarocks); Leere (empties i.e. pip cards)	1 point

The three high value trumps are known as the Trull from the French tous les trois (all three). The blind is variously known as the Blinde, Leger or Cego.

== Rules ==
=== Overview ===
Cego has no standard or official rules. Every region where it is played has established its own traditional rules and they sometimes differ even within the same village. The following rules are for four players and largely follows those by Gerhard Baumann and Gerold Blümle, of the Black Forest Club at Schopfheim, supplemented by other sources where indicated.

There is an auction in which players bid for contracts or 'games'; the winning bidder becomes the declarer and plays alone against the three defenders. In normal games, the declarer aims to take more card points than the others combined. In special games there are different aims and, in some, each plays for him- or herself. Deal, bidding and play are anti-clockwise.

=== Deal ===
The dealer deals the top 10 cards of the pack to the table, face down, as the blind, and then 11 cards to each player in turn and in a single packet.

=== Auction ===
==== Phase 1 - Hand games ====
In Phase 1 players bid for one of the two Hand games: (Note: Hand-Spiele.) Solo or Ultimo. In these games, players use their hand cards, not the blind.

- Solo. Forehand (on the dealer's right) opens the bidding and players, in turn, either pass by saying "fort" or bid "Solo!" (Note: Alternatives to "fort" are "fort Solo" or "Solofort".) If a Solo bid is not countered, its bidder becomes the declarer and plays against the three defenders. The blind belong to the Solo player but may not be seen or scored until the end.
- Counter-Solo. If Solo is bid, a later player, in turn, may call "Counter-Solo!" (Note: Called a Gegensolo and bid with e.g. "ich gehe dagegen".) which is a bid to play a Cego (see below) and cannot be overcalled. (Note: None of the rules are explicit about the bidding sequence after a call of Solo except John McLeod's description at pagat.com which makes clear that, as soon as Solo is called, the opportunity to bid a Countersolo goes first to forehand and then the others in turn, rather than continuing to the next player to the right. It makes no real difference provided all are allowed to speak, since forehand has positional priority anyway. The same applies to a bid of Countersolo in McLeod because his rules allow for further bidding as per Phase 2. However these rules follow Baumann & Blümle in which a Countersolo ends the bidding.)
- Ultimo. A player confident of winning the last trick with the Geiss may call "Ultimo!" which ends the auction immediately and is played. If the declarer succeeds, the game is won; otherwise it is lost. (Note: Baumann & Blümle call the Pagat the Kleiner Mann, the "Little Man".) Ultimo must be called before bidding begins. Under some rules, forehand must ask if anyone has an Ultimo before opening the bidding.

If all pass, players may call one of the following special games. (Note: Sometimes called a Null game or Nullspiel because the aim is to take no tricks or very few tricks.) (Note: In Baumann & Blümle, bidding for Null games takes place at the start of Phase 2, but the process is unclear. Weißauer places it here and adds Pascha, Duo, Trio, Quarto and Quinto as options.) If two or more want to play a special, positional priority applies. (Note: In effect Piccolo and Bettel are of equal ranking. In the Black Forest Championship, however, Piccolo takes precedence over Bettel and so there are two rounds of bidding at this point; first for Piccolo, then for Bettel.) The options are:

- Piccolo. The declarer must take exactly one trick or the game is lost. It ranks over all other games except Ultimo.
- Bettel. As Piccolo but the declarer must lose every trick.

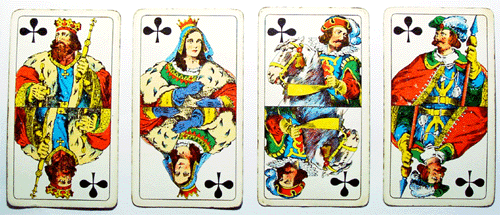
The four court cards in the suit of Clubs

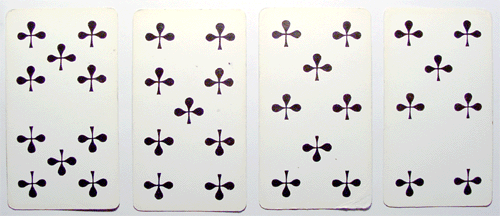
The four pip cards in the suit of Clubs

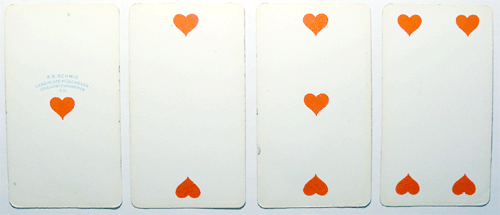
The four pip cards in the suit of Hearts

==== Phase 2 - Cego games ====
If Counter-Solo was bid, it ends the bidding and a Cego is played. If all pass in Phase 1 and no specials were bid, there is now an auction of bidding with immediate hold. Forehand opens by calling "Cego" and subsequent players, in turn, either pass by saying "good" or "fort", (Note: Or alternatively "I'm fine" or "happy"; in German: weg, mir ist recht, mir'sch wohl, Genehm or Fort are used.) or name the next higher bid; no jump bidding being allowed. If a later player overcalls a bid, the earlier bidder may hold by saying "mine" or "my game" (Note: In German: selbst or hab' ich selber.) otherwise must pass. If a bid is held, the later player must raise to the next level or pass. As soon as either passes, the next player in turn may pass or name the next game. This continues until three have passed, whereupon the successful bidder becomes the declarer and plays the announced game. It may not be raised further. Possible bids are:

- Cego. The declarer keeps 2 hand cards, setting aside the rest in a pile called the Legage, picks up the blind and discards 1 more card to end up with 11 cards in hand.
- One-er (Eine). The declarer keeps 1 card, sets aside the Legage, picks up the blind and plays with it.
- One Pip (Eine Leere). The declarer lays 1 pip card down face up, sets the Legage aside, and picks up the blind. The pip is led to the first trick.
- Two Pips (Zwei Leere). The declarer lays 2 pip cards of the same suit face up on the table, sets the Legage aside, picks up the blind, discards 1 card and leads the pips to the first 2 tricks.
- Two Odds (Zwei Verschiedene). As Two Pips, except that the 2 cards must be of different suits.
- Geiss. The highest bid. A player with the Geiss keeps it and sets the Legage aside, picking up the blind. The Geiss must be led to the first trick (which it will lose); the declarer then continues to play with the blind.

In all Cego games, the Legage and any discards count to the declarer at the end.

==== Special forehand games ====
If forehand bids Cego and the rest pass, forehand may announce a (negative) game:

- Robber (Räuber). All play for themselves and the loser is the one with the most points. The game is doubled for each player who takes no tricks. If forehand loses, the game is doubled.
- Thresher (Drescher). Whoever takes the last trick loses. If this is the declarer the game is lost double.

=== Play ===
The aim is to amass more card points than the opposition. The declarer leads to the first trick. Players must follow suit if able, otherwise must trump. Only if unable to do either, may a player discard any card. There is no compulsion to head the trick. A trick is won by the highest trump or, if no trumps are played, by the highest card of the led suit.

In Two Pips and Two Odds, the declarer also leads to the second trick, regardless of who wins the first. (Note: McLeod states that, if these tricks are made be different players, the one who won with the higher winning card leads to the third trick; if of equal rank, the card of the higher suit wins; the suits ranking in descending order: ♣ ♠ ♥ ♦. None of the other sources here mention this, so presumably the winner of the second trick leads to the third.)

=== Scoring ===
==== Normal games ====
In the normal (Solo and Cego) games, players work out their card points using the Tarock scoring system: the cards are scored in packets of three, for each packet the card points are totalled and 2 points deducted. In Solo games, the cards in the blind count to the declarer; in Cego games those laid aside in the Legage count to the declarer.

Example: K C J = 5 + 3 + 2 - 2 = 8 card points and Truck 14, Truck 11 and Truck 1 (Geiss) = 1 + 1 + 5 - 2 = 5 points. Two blanks (ordinary Trucks or pip cards) left over score 1 point; a single blank left over scores nothing. There are 70 card points in total and the declarer needs at least 36 to win; a tie on 35-35 is win for the defenders.

In social rounds, each contract has a game value in (euro) cents. This is multiplied by a factor based on the declarer's score in card points; in the table this is negative if the declarer lost. (Note: In tournaments or other games where points are reckoned, the game value is earned in plus points and paid in minus points.) Note that a Solo wins double and loses single; a Countersolo wins fourfold and loses double. The game values and factors are:

Scoring Table – normal games
Game values
Game	Cego	One-er	One Pip	Two Pips	Two Odds	Pagat	Solo won		Solo lost		Countersolo won			Countersolo lost		
Value	1¢	2¢	3¢	4¢	5¢	6¢	2¢		4¢		4¢			2¢		
Score factors
Declarer's score	0	1–5	6–10	11–15	16–20	21–25	26–30	31-35	36–40	41–45	46–50	51–55	56–60	61–65	66–69	70
Factors	-8	-7	-6	-5	-4	-3	-2	-1	1	2	3	4	5	6	7	8

Example: if Anna wins a One Pip game (game value 3¢) with 47 card points, she earns 3¢ x 3 = 9¢ from each defender i.e. a total of 27¢. If game points are used instead of money, Anna scores +27 and each defender -9 game points. If Anna loses the game with 27 card points, she pays each defender 3¢ x 2 = 6¢, paying out a total of 18¢. In soft score, she would deduct -18 games points and each defender would score +6.

==== Special games ====
In the specials a fixed score or payment is made. These vary widely; the table illustrates payments by Grupp (1994), Baumann & Blümle (2013), the Cegofreunde St. Georgen (2012), Weißauer (2017), Kastner & Folkvord (2005) and cego-online (2011).

Game values – special games (in cents, except where stated)
Game	Grupp	B&B	CSG	Weißauer	K&F	c-online	Remarks
Piccolo	30 pf	10 or 15	15	70	40	40	Take one trick.
Bettel	20 pf	15 or 10	20	80	50	30	Take no tricks.
Ultimo	–	20	20	80	80	80	Win last trick with the Geiss(1).
Robber (Räuber)	10 pf	5	10	40	30	40	Avoid most points. Doubled if anyone takes 0 tricks. If tied, pay jointly.
Thresher (Drescher)	–	–	10	80	–	–	Avoid taking last trick. Doubled if declarer loses.

The blind is ignored in special games. Note that in a Robber, card points are calculated as in normal games in order to determine the loser; in the other special games, card points are not reckoned because there is a specific objective to achieve or avoid.

=== Penalties for revoking ===
For transgressions, such as the declarer forgetting to discard and has one card too many at the end, the game is lost. By pre-agreement, such an infraction may incur an eightfold loss of the game.

== Variations ==
There are many local and regional variations in the rules. The following is a selection:

=== Solo variations ===
- Strict Solo (Geregelter Solo). If players agreed to play Solo 'with regulations', then a player with more than 8 trumps – or 7 trumps, 2 of which are higher than 16, and only 2 suits – must call a Solo. Failure to do so is called reneging (Schinden, lit. "flaying" or "flogging", but implying a 'holding back'. (Note: Schinden, also called lauern ("lurking") in card games normally means holding back a high value card in order to capture another high value one. See e.g. Castelli (1839).)) and may result in a challenge before play begins. If a renege is exposed the reneger loses eightfold; (Note: That is, eight times the last game value bid.) if there has been no renege, the challenger loses eightfold.

Schinden is not cheating, but a legal way of conduct bearing the risk of being caught.

- Held Counter-Solo. The Solo bidder may hold, and thus play, a bid of Counter-Solo.
- Counter-Solo auction. A call of Counter-Solo (which equates to a Cego) triggers part 2 of the auction in which players may bid higher. Further bidding starts with the player to the right of the Counter-Solo bidder and players must bid higher or pass by saying "good". The game values all increase by 1.
- March. A Solo bidder may also announce a March or Solo March (Durchmarsch), which is an undertaking to make every trick.

=== Special game variations ===
- Ultimo variations. In some regions Ultimos are also played with the 2- or 3-trump or with specific combinations of 1-, 2-, and 3-trumps. Other Ultimo contracts include:
  - Solo Ulti. The declarer has to win a Solo as well as taking either the last trick with the Geiss, the penultimate trick with the Truck 2 or the pre-penultimate trick with the Truck 3. The declarer may opt to go for two or even all three Ultimo feats.
  - Solo Durch. The declarer has to win all tricks.
  - Solo Ulti Durch. The declarer must take all tricks and the specified Ulti trick or tricks announced.
- Pascha. The declarer holds the three highest Trucks – Stiess, Mond and trump 20 – and must take exactly 3 tricks with them. Valued at 30 cents.
- Duo, Zwiccolo, Mord or Duccolo. The declarer must take exactly 2 tricks. Another name is Grebsler, valued at 15 cents.
- Trio The declarer must take exactly 3 tricks.
- Quarto. The declarer must take exactly 4 tricks.
- Quinto. The declarer must take exactly 5 tricks.
- Ouverte games. A special may be played ouverte in which case the game scores double.

=== Forehand special variations ===
Sometimes two versions of Robber are played:

- Strict Robber (Geregelter Räuber). The player with the Stiess must play it to the first trick. The Mund (21) must be played to the second and the Geiss (1) to the third trick. If any of these cards is in the blind, the top three trumps are led, in descending order.
- Wild Robber (Wilder Räuber). Name given to the ordinary Räuber to distinguish it from the regulated version. Weißauer adds that, if forehand ties with another player for highest points, forehand loses.

=== Cego game variations ===
- Halber (Halbe, Halber) In many places there is an intermediate bid of Halber ("Half") between Cego and One-er. The declarer adds one card to the blind and plays a pip card face up, setting aside the remaining hand cards which, as usual, count to the declarer at the end. The declarer plays with the blind and may exchange the pip card with a face card in hand. The game value is x2 and the remaining games are increased by one e.g. a One-er is x3, One Pip is x4, etc.
- Two Pips with trump discard. The declarer must also discard the lowest trump from the blind, showing it to the others first.
- Two Odds with trump discard. The declarer must also discard the highest trump from the blind.
- Viewing discards. The discarded tricks may be viewed until after the third trick of the game.

=== Scoring variations ===
In some parts of the Black Forest, a simplified card point scoring system is used which involves counting the cards in pairs. If there are no counters (court cards or Trull cards) in a pair it scores 1 point, if one card is a counter it scores the full amount and if both cards are counters, 1 point is deducted. This gives 80 points in the pack and 40 are needed for a win.

== Three-hand Cego ==
The three player game has the following key differences:

- It is played with 51 cards, the ♠7, ♣7 and ♦4 being removed.
- Each player is dealt 13 cards and 12 go into the blind.
- Because there are only 69 card points in the pack, the declarer always gets a bonus point.
- If Regulated Solo is played, a player with more than 9 trumps – or 8 trumps, 2 of which are higher than 16, and only 2 suits – must call a Solo.
- Null games, such as Piccolo and Bettel are not played.

== Two-hand Cego ==
There are two variants of two-handed Cego. The first is Officers' Cego (Offiziers-Cego). In the Unadingen version, each player receives 27 cards. In a manner reminiscent of Officers' Skat or Officers' Schafkopf, the non-dealer is given 5 cards face down on the table, followed by 5 likewise to the dealer. This is repeated before the final 14 cards are dealt, 7 to each player to form their hand cards. Any faced Trocks are picked up and added to the hand cards. Non-dealer leads to the first trick and suit must be followed if possible. If unable to follow, a player must trump with a Trock. Lacking a card of the led suit or a Trock, the player must discard any available card (i.e. one from the hand or face up on the table). The trick winner leads to the next trick. If an upcard is played from the table, the downcard beneath it is turned over at the end of the trick, any Trocks being added to the hand cards. After all cards are played, the score is reckoned using the 78-point system and the player with 40 or more wins.

A quite different version, Dorset Cego, was devised in England in 2022 in order to practise and replicate the normal three-player game. Three cards are removed from the pack and the cards dealt as in Three-hand Cego, the third player being represented by a dummy hand. Beginning with non-dealer, players bid as normal for Solo or Ultimo in Phase 1. If neither wants to play a Solo, non-dealer must bid Cego and either may overcall the other until one passes, jump bidding being allowed. If the Cego goes unchallenged, non-dealer may switch to a Robber or Thresher. After the auction is decided, the defender turns the dummy face up and plays from both hands. Scoring is as per the three-hand version.

== Traditions ==
=== Going "up the mountain" ===
One tradition in the High Black Forest is that a player who plays a Cego fails to take a single trick has to go "up the mountain". The player buys a round of schnaps and the others stand and sing the opening line of the Lake Constance Song (Bodenseelied) substituting the player's name e.g. "Auf dem Berg so hoch da droben, da steht der Karl" ("On the mountaintop so high above, there stands Karl").

== Literature ==
- _ (1907). Herders Konversations-Lexikon, Vol. 8 (Spinnerei–Zz). 3rd edn. Freiburg im Breisgau: Herder. Also Berlin, Karlsruhe, Munich, Strasbourg, Vienna and St. Louis, MO.
- Bamberger, Johannes (1999). "Cego" in Die beliebtesten Kartenspiele. Vienna, Munich: Perlen-Reihe. pp. 65–73. ISBN 3852234077
- Baumann, Gerhard and Gerold Blümle (2022). Das Cegospiel. Schwarzwaldverein Schopfheim.
- Bielefeld, A. (1868). Rheinschwäbisch. Humoristische Gedichte vom Verfasser "des weiland Gottlieb Biedermaier". Karlsruhe: A. Bielefeld.
- Birlinger, Anton and Friedrich Pfaff (1916). Alemannia. F. E. Fehsenfeld
- Boerschel, Ernst (1915). Josef Viktor von Scheffel und Emma Heim: eine Dichterliebe, mit Briefen und Erinnerungen. Hesse & Becker.
- Castelli, Ignaz Franz (1839). Freut euch des Lebens! Oder: Wollen wir lachen und fröhlich seyn ..., Volume 5. Vienna: A. Mausberger.
- Dummett, Sir Michael; McLeod, John (1975). "Cego". The Journal of the Playing-Card Society. 4 (1): 30–46. ISSN 0305-2133.
- Furr, Jerry Neill. "Cego" in Tarocchi: An introduction to the many games played with tarot cards. Philebus (2009).
- Gööck, Roland (1967). "Cego" in Freude am Kartenspiel, Bertelsmann, Gütersloh. pp. 126–128.
- Grupp, Claus D (1979) [1975]. "Cego" in Karten-spiele, Falken, Niederhausen. pp. 94–97. [Rev. edn. 2000] ISBN 3-8068-2001-5
- Grupp, Claus D (1986) [1976]. "Cego" in Schafkopf Doppelkopf, Falken, Niedernhausen. pp. 84–94. ISBN 3 8068 2015 5
- Grupp, Claus D (1994). "Cego" in Doppelkopf Schafkopf, Falken, Niedernhausen. pp. 82–92. ISBN 3 8068 2015 5
- Harder, Hans-Joachim (1987). Militärgeschichtliches Handbuch Baden-Württemberg. Militärgeschichtliches Forschungsamt (publ.), Stuttgart: Kohlhammer, ISBN 3-17-009856-X.
- Hoffmann, Detlef (1972). Die Welt der Spielkarte. Callway.
- Hülsemann, Robert (1930). "Cego-Tarock" in Das Buch der Spiele für Familie und Gesellschaft. Leipzig: Hesse & Becker. pp. 205–206.
- Kastner, Hugo and Gerald Kador Folkvord (2005). "Cego (Badisches Tarock)" in Die große Humboldt-Enzyklopädie der Kartenspiele, Humboldt, Baden-Baden. pp. 226–230. ISBN 978-3-89994-058-9
- Weißauer, Jürgen (2016). "Cego" in Modernes Skatspiel – Binokel, Cego und Vira. pp. 108–133.
- Martin, Ulf; McLeod, John (2018). "Playing the Game: Dreierles". The Playing-Card. 47 (2): 81–84.
- P.A. (1860). Historische Entwicklung der praktische Regeln des Zigo-Taroc-Spieles. Mannheim: J. Schneider.
- Pieper, Sven and Bärbel Schmidt (1994). "Cego" in Kartenspiele, Reclams Universalbibliothek, Vol. 4216, Stuttgart. pp. 98–106.
- Stolz, Aloys (1901). Geschichte der Stadt Pforzheim. Städt. Tagblatts.
- von Weech, Friedrich (1892). "Badische Truppen in Spanien 1810–1813" in Badische Neujahrsblätter, 2nd issue, 1892. pp. 3–59.
