= Bourgeois Tarot =

European card games deck

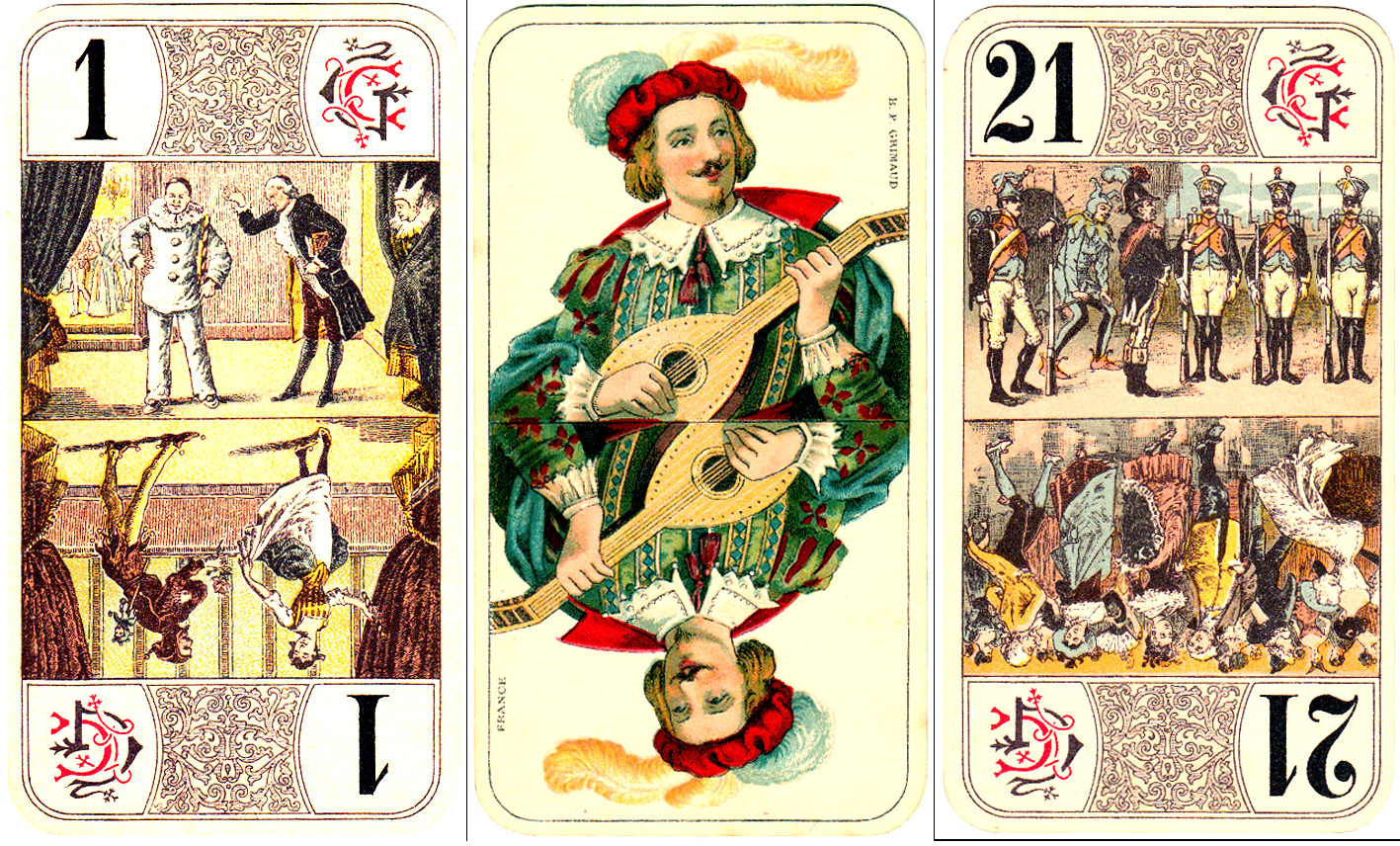
Tarot Nouveau oudlers circa 1910

The Bourgeois Tarot deck is a mid-19th century pattern of tarot cards of German origin that is used for playing card games in western Europe and Canada. It is not designed for divinatory purposes. This deck is most commonly found in France, Belgian Wallonia, Swiss Romandy and the Canadian province of Québec for playing French Tarot; in southwest Germany for playing Cego and Dreierles; and in Denmark for Danish Tarok.

The pattern is produced in two different designs: the Black Forest pack used only in southwest Germany and the Tarot Nouveau used everywhere else, but especially in France. The International Playing-Card Society (IPCS) classifies both types as Bourgeois Tarot. The pattern is also called the Domestic Scenes pattern, but the name Bourgeois Tarot is preferred by the IPCS. Simon Wintle also refers to the original design by C.L. Wüst as the Encyclopedic Tarot.

== Origin ==
An early German Tarock trump card, showing center indices

The Bourgeois Tarot pattern originated around 1865 with C.L. Wüst, cardmakers in Frankfurt, Germany. The early edition, sometimes called the Encyclopaedic Tarot, lacked the corner indices on suit cards found on the later 20th century version published by French cardmakers such as Grimaud, but the values of trumps changed from Latin numerals common on older decks to Arabic numerals used in modern writing. These numerals were placed in the centre of the panels in a Fraktur font similar to cards which are now used for the German Tarock game of Cego. In the early 1900s, French cardmakers appropriated this pattern and would later add the corner indices to suit cards now found on other modern card decks. The numerals of the tarots were also repositioned to the four corners, while a maker's initial is often found in the centre of the panel. On some editions, however, the maker's initial occupies two of the corners.

Meanwhile German cardmakers continued to follow the original design: no corner indices on the suit cards and centrally placed numerals on the tarocks (tarots).

== Cards ==
The cards bear the French suits of spades, hearts, diamonds and clubs, rather than the Italian suits of swords, cups, coins and batons (typical in tarot decks used for cartomancy) or the traditional German suits of hearts, bells, acorns and leaves (commonly seen on Tarock and Schafkopf decks in East Germany, Austria and Hungary). The "pip" and court cards of the Bourgeois Tarot are similar in format to those of the traditional 52-card deck, with the addition of the knight (chevalier) face card.

The atouts or trumps vary in design. Those of the 78-card, Fournier type depict genre scenes of whimsical early 19th-century social activities of the well-to-do European bourgeoisie, hence the name, Bourgeois Tarot. In this design, the cards have corner indices; on older packs only at the top left/bottom right, with the manufacturer's initials at the top right/bottom left. Modern packs have four corner indices.

By contrast, the tarocks of the 54-card, Black Forest Cego packs by F.X. Schmid used in southwest Germany for games such as Cego and Dreierles, have more rustic and rural scenes and the indices are placed at the top centre at both ends of the double-headed cards.

Both corner indices and the reversible art of the courts and trumps facilitate the identification of cards when fanned in a player's hand.

=== Tarot Nouveau ===
The largest manufacturers of the Tarot Nouveau pattern are Cartamundi and its subsidiaries, Ducale, Fournier and Grimaud; and Piatnik of Austria. They still produce the 78-card pack used for French Tarot and Danish Tarok; the trumps (tarots) depict typical nineteenth century French scenes of well-to-do bourgeoisie at home and in the town and country, with numerals in each corner.

==== Composition ====
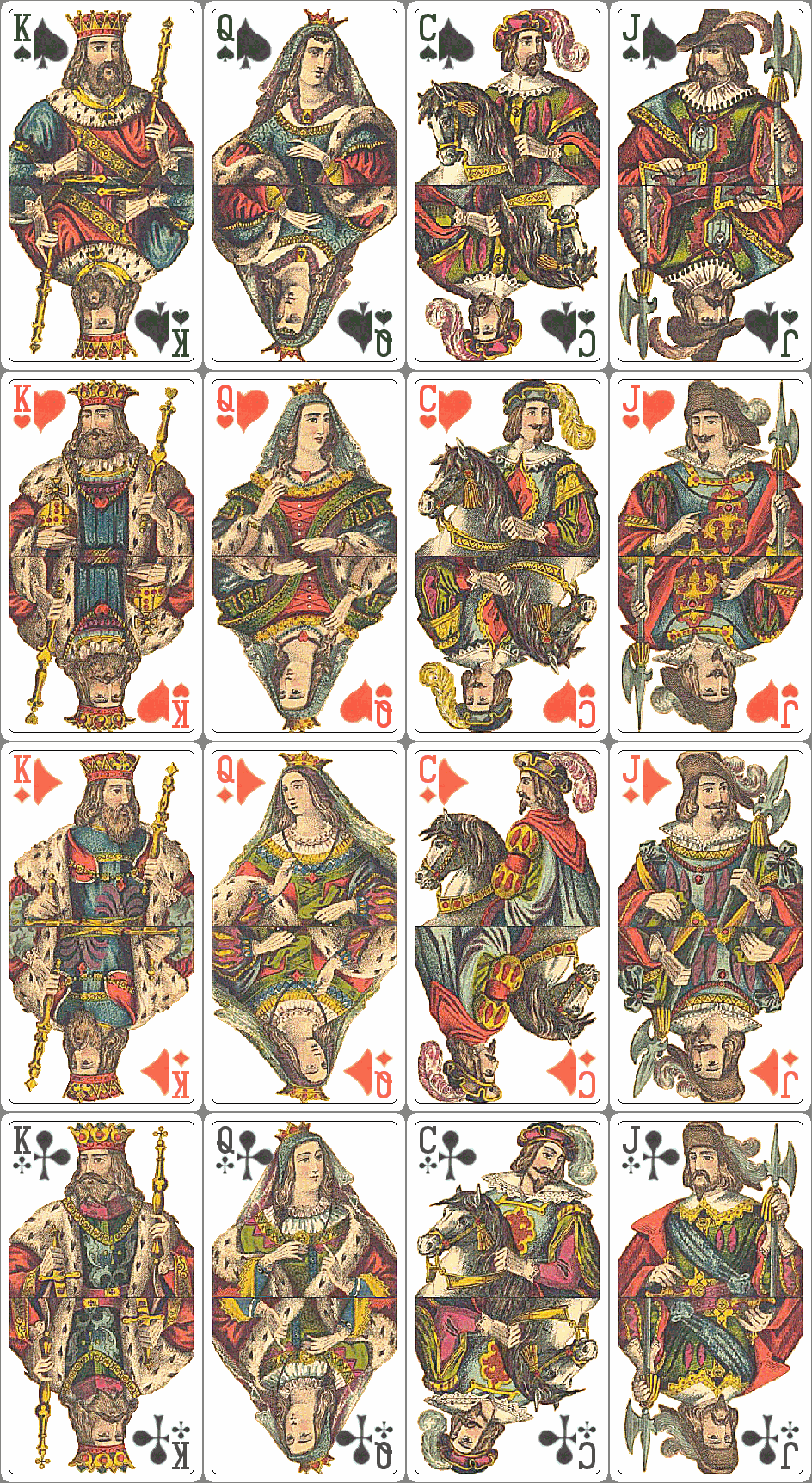
Tarot Nouveau court cards with English indices

The Fournier type of Tarot Nouveau deck, like most (but not all) tarot decks, is composed of 78 cards. 56 are suited in the traditional French suits, with 14 cards per suit; ten "pip" cards with values 1 to 10 (the ace bears the number 1 instead of the familiar "A" and usually ranks low) and four court cards: jack (valet), knight or cavalier (chevalier or cavalier), queen (dame) and king (roi). The other 22 are the 21 atouts or trumps and one fool. The deck is thus primarily different from the standard 52-card deck in the existence of the separate trump "suit" and the addition of the knight as a court card. With these cards removed the deck is identical to the 52-card deck for playing purposes. The face cards do not use the Parisian pattern (portrait officiel) but have their own unique illustrations. The fool, though similar in appearance and function to the joker card of poker decks, has differing origins (see Joker for more information).

==== Trumps ====
The 21 trumps in a Tarot Nouveau deck each have two scenes taking up the graphic portion of the card, in a roughly reversible fashion (one scene is always face-up), but unlike the court cards which have similar reversible art, most of the cards' scenes are not rotationally symmetrical. Each card has one scene show an "urban" representation of a particular trait or idea (listed below), while the other side depicts a more "rural" interpretation. These themes, instead of the historical and symbolic depictions, such as those used in the Tarot de Marseille, were chosen to represent tarot trumps in Unicode 7.0. The scenes depicted are tabulated below together with an interpretation of the seasons and themes represented by the French Tarot club of Orphin:

General theme	Card number	Unicode character	Card theme	Urban representation	Rural representation
The four ages	2	🃢	Childhood	Children playing in the park	Boys playing at the fête
The four ages	3	🃣	Youth	Group of youths in the park	Three maidens in town clothes
The four ages	4	🃤	Maturity	In the office	Women with children
The four ages	5	🃥	Old Age	Grandfather	Grandmother
The four times of day	6	🃦	Morning	Breakfast	Mowing the wheat
The four times of day	7	🃧	Afternoon	Discussion in the parlour	Rest in the field
The four times of day	8	🃨	Evening	Music room	The family reunited on the doorstep
The four times of day	9	🃩	Night	Returning home after hunting	The night watch
The four elements	10	🃪	Earth		The mine
The four elements	10	🃪	Air		Shepherd in the mountains
The four elements	11	🃫	Water		Boating on the lake
The four elements	11	🃫	Fire		The picnic
The four leisures	12	🃬	Dance	Soirée	Folk dance
The four leisures	13	🃭	Shopping	The store	The village store
The four leisures	14	🃮	Open air	Hunting	Fishing
The four leisures	15	🃯	Visual arts	Photography	Painting
The four seasons	16	🃰	Spring	Gardener in the park	Sheep shearing
The four seasons	17	🃱	Summer	At the races	Drying the wheat
The four seasons	18	🃲	Autumn	At the market	Threshing wheat
The four seasons	19	🃳	Winter	Skating	The vigil
The game	20	🃴	The game	Cards	Bowling
Folly	21	🃵	Collective	The carnival	The military parade
Folly	1	🃡	Individual	The sad clown The fool and the ballerina	

== Black Forest Cego ==
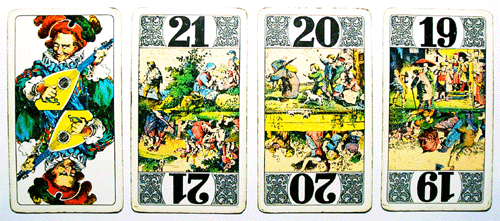
The highest trumps

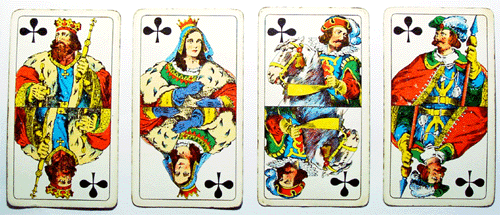
Court cards

The second type of pack in use is produced by F.X. Schmid. It dates to the 19th century and more closely follows the Encyclopedic Tarot design of C.L. Wüst. It may have originally comprised 78 cards and been used for games such as Grosstarock, but more recently it has only been produced in a shortened form used for the game of Cego. Cego is the national game of Baden and is played with two different patterns of pack: this one and an animal tarot pack known as Adler Cego. This variant of the Bourgeois Tarot depicts on its trump cards scenes of rural and town life based on woodcuts by Ludwig Richter. The same pack was produced by Bielefelder Spielkarten from 1955 to 1974 and the pattern was also manufactured by A.S.S. In the 1970s, this was the most common pattern used for playing Cego, but ASS have ceased mainstream production and as of 2022 their pack was only obtainable from a couple of outlets. (Note: For example, Fahnen Staeb and the Fürstenberg Brewery.)

=== Composition ===
This pack has the 54-cards needed for the game of Cego. There are 32 French-suited cards with 8 cards per suit. There are four court cards as in the French Bourgeois Tarot pack, but only four pip cards per suit. In the black suits these are the 10, 9, 8 and 7, ranking in their normal order (10 high); in the red suits they are the Ace, 2, 3 and 4, ranking in reverse order (Ace high). None of the cards bear index numbers. The Fool depicts a minstrel and the other 21 trump cards (known, like the Fool, as Trucks or Drucks) bear everyday rural and domestic scenes.

== Literature ==
- Dummett, Sir Michael and John McLeod (1975). "Cego" in The Journal of the Playing-Card Society, Vol. 4, No. 1, Aug 1975, pp. 30-46. ISSN 0305-2133.
