= Dobbm =

Card game played in the Stubai valley in Austria

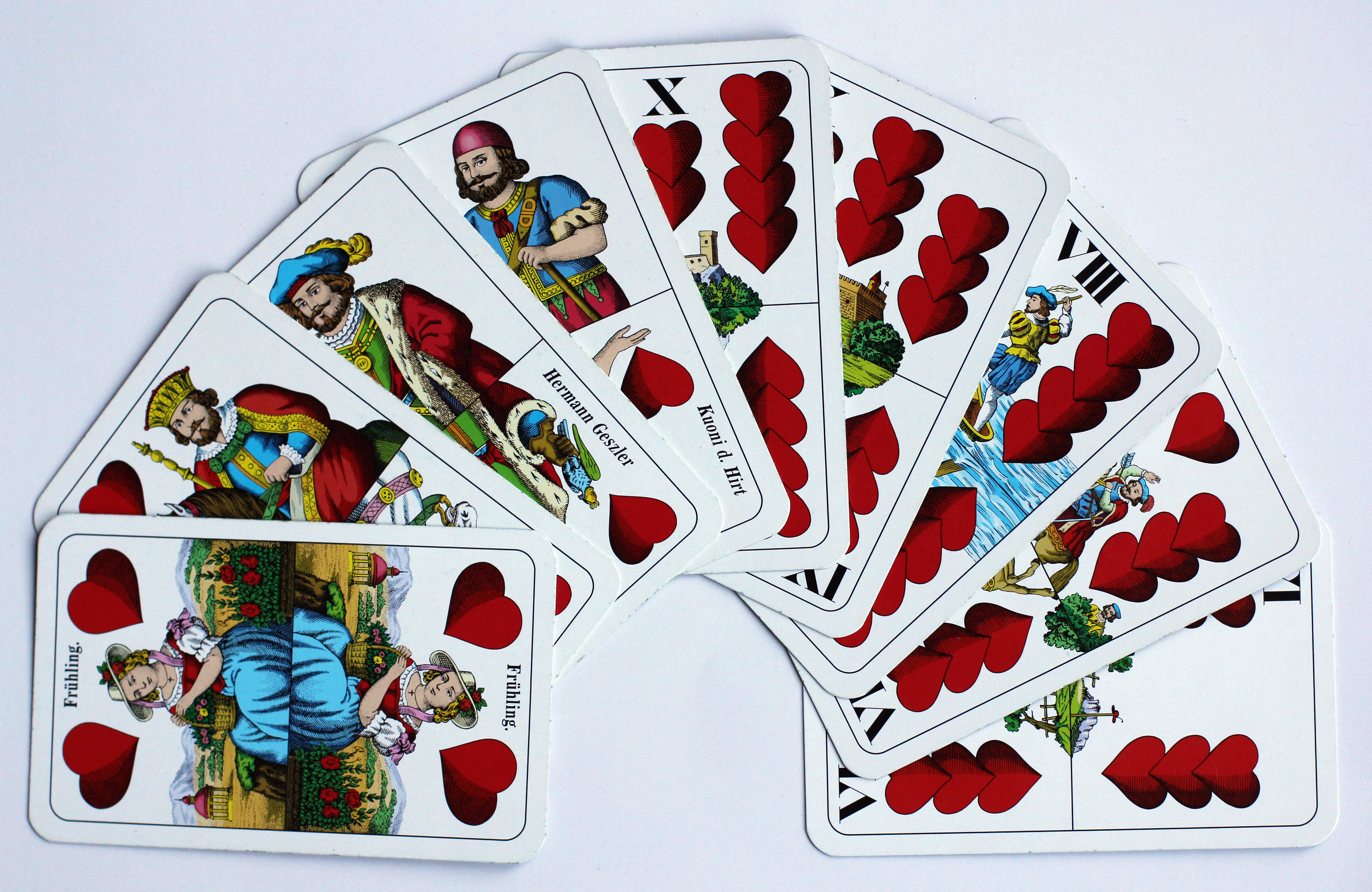
- Hearts: the permanent trump suit (but X is the second-highest trump)
- Origin: Austria
- Alternative names: Tappen
- Type: Point-trick
- Family: German Tarok group
- Players: 4
- Cards: 36
- Deck: William Tell
- Rank (high→low): S 10 K O U 9 8 7 6
- Play: Clockwise
- Chance: Moderate

Related games
- Bauerntarock • Bavarian Tarock • Tapp
- Contracts: Dobbm or Solo. Hearts are permanent trumps.

Dobbm or Tappen is a card game played in the Stubai valley in Austria and is one of a family of games derived from the Tarot game of Grosstarock by adapting its rules to a regular, shortened pack of 36 cards. The ranking and point value of the cards in Dobbm is typical of the family and, like its other members, one player always plays as a soloist against all the others. It is highly popular in the Stubai valley among card players of all generations, but is unknown in the surrounding regions.

== Aim ==
The aim of the soloist is to score more than 60 card points (Augen) in tricks, unless he has announced a higher target. The opposing team only needs to score 60 points to win.

== Players ==
There are 4 active players. Five can play, in which case the dealer takes a holiday (er feiert).

== Cards ==
Dobbm was originally played with Salzburg pattern cards until the 1960s, but now it played with a deck of 36 cards of the William Tell or Hungarian pattern, the so-called Tell cards.

=== Trick-taking strength ===
The cards’ trick-taking power broadly corresponds to their card point value. Thus the Sow (Sau) or Deuce (Daus) is the highest-ranking card. Then follow the: Ten > King > Ober > Unter > Nine > Eight > Seven > Six. This ranking is also valid within the trump suit as well as the plain suits. Hearts are permanent trumps.

Ranking of the cards
Permanent trump suit
A 10 K O U 9 8 7 6
Plain suits
Acorns	Leaves	Bells
A 10 K O U 9 8 7 6	A 10 K O U 9 8 7 6	A 10 K O U 9 8 7 6

=== Card value ===
The card values are the same as in Schafkopf or the related games of Bauerntarock, Bavarian Tarock. The ten, with 10 points, is just below the Sow (11 points) in value, but well above the King (4), Ober (3) and Unter (2). The so-called Spatzen ("sparrows" i.e. the Nines, Eights, Sevens and Sixes) only play a role during the game based on their trick-taking ability, but do not score points at the end of the hand.

Ranks and card-point values of cards
Rank	A	10	K	O	U	9	8	7	6
Value	11	10	4	3	2	–			

There are 120 card points in the deck. The Six of Bells is marked as "WELI" but has no significance in this game.

== Deal ==
The first dealer is chosen by lot. The dealer shuffles the cards and the player on the dealer's right cuts. The dealer then deals 2 packets of four cards to each player in clockwise order. The last four cards are placed face down on the table to form the Dobb. The role of dealer does not rotate; instead the last declarer becomes the dealer.

== Bidding ==
=== Contracts ===
There are basically two types of contract:

- Dobbm: A form of Exchange contract. The soloist takes the talon (called the dobb) and discards four cards of his choice. Because the points of the discarded cards count as part of the declarer's tricks, a Sow (Deuce) may only be discarded if it is accompanied by a trump card. If two Sows are discarded, two trump cards must also be discarded.
- Solo: the soloist turns down the option of exchanging cards with the talon.

Forehand opens the bidding. Each player has one chance to bid and there is no holding. Players may say "pass" (weiter), "Dobbm" or "I'll dobb" (i dob = ich tappe, "I tap") or "Solo". Players may accept a bid by saying "good" (gut) or "play on" (spiel zu). If all pass, the cards are thrown in and redealt.

=== Doubling ===
After exchanging with the Dobb, the declarer says "done" (ich liege or i lig). The defenders may then double the stake (schießen or einen Schwachen geben). This starts with the player to the dealer's left who says "good" or "play on" if happy to continue, or "Schwacher" (an Schwachn) to double the stakes. If he wants to play on, the other defenders in turn may opt to double the stakes. If one of the defenders says Schwacher, the declare may either accept it by saying "good" or double the stake again by saying "Retour". The defenders may then say "Retour" in response.

== Playing ==
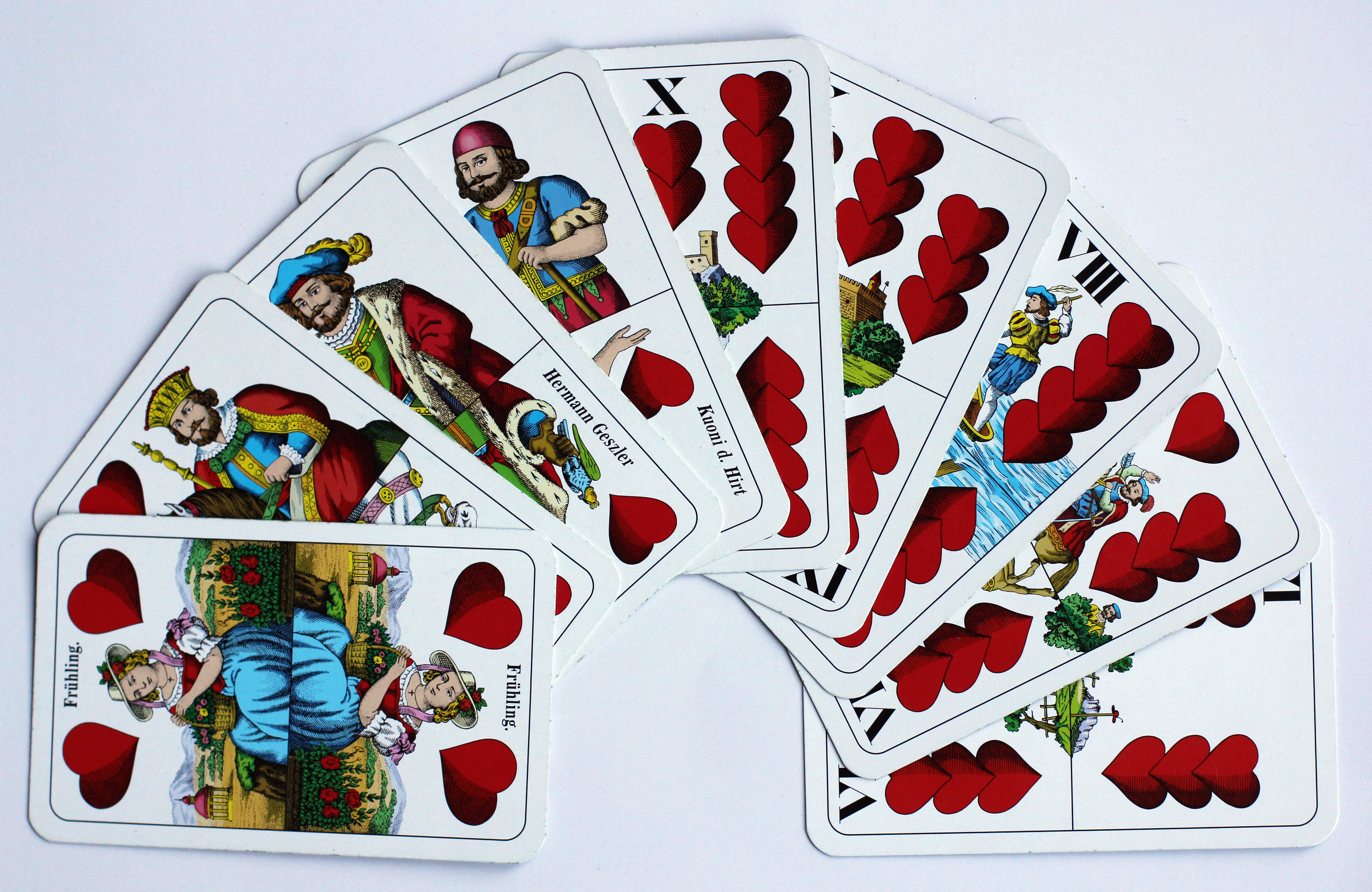
Hearts: the permanent trump suit

Play is clockwise and the declarer leads to the first trick. Each player must follow suit if possible (Farbzwang). If a player is unable to follow suit, he must trump (Trumpfzwang, i.e. play a card of the Hearts suit). The winner of the trick leads to the next trick. The defenders keep their tricks in one place.

== Scoring ==
After the last trick has been taken the sides count their card points, the declarer remembering to including the dobb. There are 120 card points in toto. If the winning side takes all tricks it is a matsch.

The stake is expressed in terms of the cost of a matsch (worth 60 points) and is typically a multiple of six e.g. 6 or 12 schillings. The winning side claims the amount of money, chips or game points based on the number of card points above 60 that they have scored e.g. if a matsch is worth 12 schillings and the declarer scores 71 points, he receives 3 schillings from each defender. (Note: That is, 1 schilling for every 5 points, or part thereof, above 60 points.) If both sides score 60 it is a draw (eingestellt). The payments are doubled for a Solo, a Schwacher and each Retour.

Revoking (failing to follow Farbzwang or Trumpfzwang) is called verleugnen or laungen and is penalised with half the value of the game being played.

== Ending ==
A session of Dobbm often ends with a Mußrunde ("must round"), which is where each player in turn (always being the one to the dealer's left) must be declarer and choose to play either a Dobbm or a Solo. It ends when every player has been a declarer.

== Related games ==
Dobbm most strongly resembles the Austrian game of Brixental Bauerntarock in that it is also played by four players, each player is dealt eight cards, four cards go to the talon and Hearts are the permanent trump suit. It is also related to a special version of Tarock also played in the Stubai valley and known as Droggn.

== Literature ==
- Michael Dummett, Sylvia Mann: The game of Tarot. From Ferrara to Salt Lake City. Duckworth, London 1980, ISBN 0-7156-1014-7.
- McLeod, John and Remigius Geiser (1999). "Stubai Droggn and Dobbm - two living fossils of the Austrian card game landscape" in The Playing-Card, Vol. XXVII, No. 6, May/June 1999 and Vol. XXVIII, No. 1, July/August 1999.
