= C.L. Wüst =

German playing card manufacturer

C.L. Wüst was a German playing card manufacturer that was founded by Conrad Ludwig Wüst in 1819 and was active until 1927.

== History ==
Conrad Wüst was born around 1783. In 1811, he was granted a licence to start up a cardmaking business in Frankfurt that was to last over a century. Initially the company made card products for numerous purposes, but over time the manufacture of playing cards became dominant and Wüst used his connexions with the theatre scene in Frankfurt to create cards incorporating images of well-known actors and actresses which further boosted sales.

Conrad Wüst capitalised on new technology by upgrading his works with a steam-powered printing press to increase the rate of production, by the use of lithography and by taking advantage of new gas street lighting to extend working hours.

Wüst died in 1843 and his son, Caspar Ludwig, took over the business. His works were displayed at the 1851 Great Exhibition at Crystal Palace, England and the 1854 Paris Exposition. By this time he was by exporting to the Netherlands, the Rhineland, Switzerland, Hamburg and Bavaria.

The popular Badenese tarot game of Cego gave Caspar Wüst the opportunity to design a new pack of cards with scenes illustrating the "sharp divide between rich and poor". This was the progenitor of the Bourgeois Tarot pattern of tarot cards that is still produced in derivative forms today, not just for Cego but also for France's national game of French Tarot. To meet the demand for the hugely popular game of Skat, Wüst also introduced the first double-ended card pack split diagonally, a pattern which became a house standard.

Wüst continued to expand worldwide during the late nineteenth century capturing markets in South America, China and India. The company stayed in the hands of the family, continuing to prosper, until the economic decline of the post war years made it unprofitable to continue. In 1927, the company was absorbed into Altenburger VSS in 1927, the factory in Frankfurt was shut down and all rights transferred to VSS.
