= Gerold Blümle =

German economist

Gerold Blümle (born 1937) is a German economist.

== Life ==
Blümle was born on 30 January 1937 in Lörrach, Württemberg and, from 1972 to 2002, he was the Professor of Mathematical Economics at the University of Freiburg and a leading German exponent of the theory of income distribution and external trade theory.

Blümle's brother is the Swiss-German economist Ernst-Bernd Blümle. During his studies, which he spent in Freiburg im Breisgau and in Freiburg im Üechtland, among other places, he joined the Catholic Student Associations, K.St.V. Germania-Hohentwiel and K.St.V. Carolingia-Friborg, in the Kartellverband.

From 1985 to 1990 he was a member of the Advisory Board of the Friedrich Naumann Foundation for Freedom of economic-liberal party Free Democratic Party in Germany. For many years, Blümle has also researched, lectured, taught and written on the subject of Baden's national game of Cego.

== Science ==
In his research, Blümle integrates economic history with theory, advocating that political economics should fundamentally support life, with theoretical and historical perspectives interconnected.

Gerold Blümle developed a business cycle model as a predator-prey relationship. In this model, there is a cyclical relationship between the investment ratio and the spread or variance of the profits, which is represented by Lotka-Volterra equations.

== Works ==
- Theorie der Einkommensverteilung. 1975.
- Fortschritt und Schöpfungsglaube oder Die Machbarkeit des Glücks. 1984.
- Wirtschaftsgeschichte und ökonomisches Denken, Ausgewählte Aufsätze. 2008.
- Das badische Nationalspiel Cego, 2018.
