= Detlef Hoffmann =

Detlef Hoffmann (2 October 1940 – 10 June 2013) was a German art historian.

== Life ==
Detlef Hoffmann was born on 2 October 1940 in Hamburg. He studied art history and philosophy at the University of Hamburg, the University of Freiburg, Goethe University Frankfurt, LMU Munich, and the Free University of Berlin. He was commissioned in 1968 at the University of Freiburg by Willibald Sauerländer with a thesis on the Charlemagne frescoes of Alfred Rethel doctorate. From 1968 to 1971, he did research on the cultural history of playing cards. From 1971 to 1980, he worked at the Historical Museum Frankfurt and as a lecturer at Goethe University Frankfurt.

In 1981, Hoffmann received a professorship for art and design history at the Hamburg University of Applied Sciences, from 1982 until his retirement in 2006 he taught as a professor for art history at the University of Oldenburg. There, on his initiative, the master's degree in museums and exhibitions was set up. From 1991 to 1994 he was on leave from the Institute for Advanced Studies in the Humanities in Essen (KWI), from 1994 to 1995 to the Bielefeld Centre for Interdisciplinary Research, where he researched and taught on the culture of remembrance. In 2007/2008 he was a member of the expert commission for museum registration in Lower Saxony and Bremen. From 2006, in addition to his busy publishing and exhibition activities, he worked as a consultant for the reorientation of the Lüneburg museums. On 1 March 2015 he was posthumously honoured with the Medal of the Hanseatic City of Lüneburg.

For twenty years (1984-2004), he designed and moderated public colloquia with art historians and scientists from other disciplines at the Evangelical Academy of Loccum and published a total of 19 conference volumes of the Loccum Protocols.

Hoffmann married to psychological psychotherapeutist Maria Hoffmann-Lüning in 1965, with whom he had two sons. He last lived in Munich and in Heidedorf Wesel.

== Works ==
Detlef Hoffmann is considered one of the reformers of art history after 1968. He understood art history as intellectual and social history and advocated the reconciliation of high and pop culture in art history, which also addressed the mass production of photography, film, advertising and comics.

During his time in Frankfurt, he was involved in the reorientation of the Historical Museum against strong resistance, in which the history of everyday life, women and workers was included and the exhibition didactics were redesigned. From 1973 he was a member of the board of the Ulmer Verein and temporary co-editor of the Kritische Berichte ("Critical Reports").

Hoffmann published numerous essays on photography and the history of photography since 1970. His research focused in particular on the discussion of the medium as a historical document and on its function in the field of tension between reality and memory.

From 1973 to 1995, Hoffmann was the scientific advisor to the German Museum of Playing Cards in Leinfelden-Echterdingen. From 1974 to 1977, he was president of the International Playing-Card Society (IPCS), curator of numerous exhibitions and published more than 50 publications on playing cards.

From the 1990s, Detlef Hoffmann researched the politics of remembrance about the crimes of the Nazi era with particular interest. Together with Jonathan Webber he led the EU project "Civil Society and Social Change after Auschwitz" in Oświęcim and Kraków. He curated inter alia the exhibition "Representations of Auschwitz", Kraków in 1995 and worked on the scientific advisory board of the touring exhibition Vernichtungskrieg. Crimes of the Wehrmacht 1941–1944. Hoffmann was a member of the board of trustees of the Buchenwald and Mittelbau-Dora memorial foundation and acted in an advisory capacity for the Neuengamme and Wewelsburg memorials. He was a member of the Guernica Society.

His last major exhibition Lawrence of Arabia was shown as a special exhibition in the State Museum of Nature and Man and in the Rautenstrauch-Joest-Museum in Cologne.

He died on 10 June 2013 in Hamburg, at the age of 72.

== Publications (selection) ==
Monographs

- with Mamoun Fansa (ed.): Lawrence von Arabien. Genese eines Mythos. Oldenburg Exhibition Catalogue 2010
- Zeitgeschichte aus Spuren ermitteln. Ein Plädoyer für ein Denken vom Objekt aus, in: Zeithistorische Forschungen/Studies in Contemporary History, online edition, 4 (2007) H. 1+2, URL
- Das Gedächtnis der Dinge: KZ-Relikte und KZ-Denkmäler 1945-1995. Frankfurt: Campus, 1997 (as editor)
- Kultur- und Kunstgeschichte der Spielkarte. Marburg: Jonas-Verl., 1995
- with Karl Ermert (ed.): Kunst und Holocaust: bildliche Zeugen vom Ende der westlichen Kultur. Rehburg-Loccum: Evangelische Akademie Loccum, 1993.
- with Almut Junker: Laterna magica. Lichtbilder aus Menschenwelt und Götterwelt. Berlin: Frölich und Kaufmann, 1982
- with Doris Pokorny; Albrecht Werner-Cordt: Arbeiterjugendbewegung in Frankfurt, 1904-1945: Material zu einer verschütteten Kulturgeschichte. Lahn-Giessen: Anabas-Verlag 1978
- with Sabine Rauch (ed.): Comics: Materialien zur Analyse eines Massenmediums. Texte und Materialien zum Literaturunterricht, Frankfurt: Diesterweg 1975
- Die Karlsfresken Alfred Rethels. Freiburg i. B., 1968 (Diss. Freiburg 1968)

Anthologies

- Welt – Kunst – Pädagogik – Kunstvermittlung zwischen westlichen Kunst-Konzepten und globalen Fragestellungen, in: Loccumer Protokoll No. 29/04, Rehburg-Loccum 2005, ISBN 978-3-8172-2904-8
- Kunst nach dem Krieg, in: Loccumer Protokoll No. 72/03, Rehburg-Loccum 2004, ISBN 978-3-8172-7203-7
- Kunst der Welt oder Weltkunst? Die Kunst in der Globalisierungsdebatte, in: Loccumer Protokoll No. 21/01, Rehburg-Loccum 2003, ISBN 978-3-8172-2102-8
- Vermächtnis der Abwesenheit – Spuren traumatisierender Ereignisse in der Kunst, in: Loccumer Protokoll 22/00, Rehburg-Loccum 2001, ISBN 978-3-8172-2200-1
- "Die Bildnerei der Geisteskranken" – Kunst von Außenseitern im Spannungsfeld der modernen Kunst, in: Loccumer Protokoll 70/99, Rehburg-Loccum 2001, ISBN 978-3-8172-7099-6
- Der Traum vom Gesamtkunstwerk, in: Loccumer Protokoll Nr. 09/98, Rehburg-Loccum 1998, ISBN 978-3-8172-0998-9
- Trauer und Klage, in: Loccumer Protokoll No. 66/97, Rehburg-Loccum 1998, ISBN 978-3-8172-6697-5
- Haltung - Gestik – Körpersprache - Der menschliche Körper in der Kommunikation, in: Loccumer Protokoll No. 75/96, Rehburg-Loccum 1997, ISBN 978-3-8172-7596-0
- Der Angriff der Gegenwart auf die Vergangenheit – Denkmale auf dem Gelände ehemaliger Konzentrationslager, in: Loccumer Protokoll Nr. 05/96, Rehburg-Loccum 1996, ISBN 978-3-8172-0596-7
- Das Opfer des Lebens – Bildliche Erinnerung an Märtyrer, in: Loccumer Protokoll No. 12/95, Rehburg-Loccum 1996, ISBN 978-3-8172-1295-8
- Orte der Erinnerung – Wie ist heute sichtbar, was einmal war?, in: Loccumer Protokoll No. 18/94, Rehburg-Loccum 1996, ISBN 978-3-8172-1894-3
- Deutschlandbilder – Oder doch nur Bilder von Deutschland?, in: Loccumer Protokoll No. 65/90, Rehburg-Loccum 1991, ISBN 978-3-8172-6590-9

== Literature ==
- Manfred Kittel: 'Marsch durch die Institutionen? Politik und Kultur in Frankfurt nach 1968. Oldenbourg, Munich 2011, ISBN 978-3-486-70402-0, pp. 125-160, especially pp. 133-134.
- Kia Vahland: Ein Spurenleser. Der Kunsthistoriker Detlef Hoffmann ist gestorben. In: Süddeutsche Zeitung, 13 June 2013
