= John McLeod (card game researcher) =

British mathematician, author, historian and card game researcher

John McLeod (born 28 November 1949) is a British mathematician, author, historian and card game researcher who is particularly well known for his work on tarot games as well as his reference website pagat.com which contains the rules for over 500 card games worldwide. He is described as a "prominent member" of the International Playing Card Society and is Secretary of the British Skat Association.

== Life ==
John McLeod was born in 1949. He attended King's College School, Wimbledon, and then studied mathematics at Trinity College, Cambridge before entering industry. During his time at Cambridge, he came across a pack of tarot cards and "as I opened the box, I was immediately fascinated by the cards. They looked totally different from anything I had seen before". He was then a research student in the mathematics department of the university and spent many evenings playing the Austrian tarock game of Königrufen with his students.

Later McLeod toured Europe to study the individual variants of tarock games and captured his findings in the monumental 2-volume work A History of Games Played with the Tarot Pack which he co-authored with Professor Sir Michael Dummett, the "leading authority on the history of the Tarot". According to McLeod, Tarock belongs to one of the largest and perhaps most interesting families of card games in the world.

In 2005/06 McLeod and fellow researcher, Sally Prime, travelled to Vienna to participate in the international Tarock Cup where McLeod came 35th out of 100 participants.

== pagat.com ==
McLeod created the website www.pagat.com in 1995. It has been described by card game historian, David Parlett as the "most important" card game website, its "intrinsic authority [being] constantly enhanced by the contributions of interested and knowledgeable players from all over the world". The website describes the rules of over 500 contemporary card games world wide. It also categorises games by mechanism, objective and equipment used. The website is in English and German.

== Works ==
=== Books ===
McLeod's magnum opus is the two-volume set on the history of tarot card games which he co-authored with Michael Dummett. Volume One deals with games in which the Fool is used to excuse the player from following suit or playing a trump to a trick; Volume Two deals with games played in Central Europe from the late 18th century onward, in which the Fool is used as the highest trump.

- A History of Games Played with the Tarot Pack: The Game of Triumphs, Vol. 1 (2004), Lewiston, PA: Edwin Mellen, pp. 1-402. Co-authored with Sir Michael Dummett. ISBN 978-0-7734-6447-6.
- History of Games Played with the Tarot Pack: The Game of Triumphs, Vol. 2 (2004), Lewistown, PA: Edwin Mellen, pp. 403-910. Co-authored with Sir Michael Dummett. ISBN 978-0-7734-6449-0.
- A History of Games Played with the Tarot Pack: The Game of Triumphs, Supplement (2009), Maproom, Oxford.
- "Mechanics of Card Games" (2009). www.pagat.com. Co-authored with Nick Wedd.

=== Articles (selection) ===
- "Rules of Games series 3: Cego" in The Journal of the Playing Card Society ed. by Sylvia Mann, Vol IV, No. 1, Aug 1975, pp. 31-46 (with Michael Dummett).
- "Rules of Games No. 5: Reversis" in The Journal of the International Playing Card Society, Vol. V, no. 4 (May 1977): 23-30.
- "Rules of Games: No. 8. Schafkopf" in The Journal of the Playing-Card Society, Vol. VII, No. 2. ISSN 0305-2133, November 1978, pp. 38–39 & 40–47.
- "Playing the Game: Styrivolt, Vorms and Cicera" in The Playing-Card, Vol. 25, No. 2, ed. George Beal, Sep–Oct 1996, pp. 54-55.
- "Playing the Game: Black Kings in Greenland and Black Maria in Finland" in The Playing-Card, Vol. 27, No. 1, ed. Dr. Michael Cooper, July-August 1998, pp. 14-15.
- "Playing the Game: Zwickern" in The Playing Card, Vol. 27, No. 4, ed. Michael Cooper, Jan–Feb 1999. pp. 128-131.
- "Playing the Game: king-ten-five or ace-ten-five" in The Playing-Card, Vol. 27, No. 6, ed. Dr. Michael Cooper, May-June 1999, pp. 238-239.
- "Stubai Valley Droggn and Dobbm–Two living fossils of the Austrian card game landscape"
  - "Part I: Discovery and Historical Context" in The Playing-Card, Vol. 27, No. 6, ed. Dr. Michael Cooper, May-Jun 1999, pp. 269-276 (with Remigius Geiser).
  - "Part II: Droggn (Tarock in the Stubai Valley with 66 Cards)" in The Playing-Card, Vol. 28, No. 2, ed. Dr. Michael Cooper, Sep-Oct 1999, pp. 40-49 (with Remigius Geiser).
  - "Part III: Dobbm" in The Playing-Card, Vol. 28, No. 1, ed. Dr. Michael Cooper, Jul-Aug 1999, pp. 96-100 (with Remigius Geiser).
- "Playing the Game: The Survival of Hombre" in The Playing-Card, Vol. XXIX, No. 1, July-August 2000. pp. 18–20.
- "Playing the Game: Tulip Grower's Pandoeren" in The Playing-Card, Vol. 31, No. 1, ed. Dr. Michael Cooper, Jul–Aug 2002, pp. 42-47.
- "Playing the Game: Owl or Eagle? The Uhu in Austrian Tarock" in The Playing-Card, Vol. 32, No. 1, ed. Dr. Michael Cooper, Jul-Aug 2003, pp. 33-36.
- "Playing the Game: Tarocco Ticinese" in The Playing-Card, Vol. 33, No. 1, ed. Dr. Michael Cooper, July-September 2004, pp. 18-20.
- "Playing the Game: The Benelux Games of Trumps" in The Playing-Card, Vol. 33, No. 2, ed. Dr. Michael Cooper, October–December 2004, pp. 91-95.
- "Playing the Game: Kaiser, Joffre and the Lost Heir" in The Playing-Card, Vol. 34, No. 1, ed. Dr. Michael Cooper, Jul–Sep 2005, pp. 68-72.
- "Playing the Game: Truf" in The Playing-Card, Vol. 35, No. 1, ed. Peter Endebrock, Jun-Sep 2006, pp. 64-66.
- "Playing the Game: Compendium Games" in The Playing-Card, Vol. 36, No. 1, ed. Peter Endebrock, Jul-Sep 2007, pp. 67-72.
- "Playing the Game: Origin of Königrufen" in The Playing-Card, Vol. 39, No. 1, ed. Peter Endebrock, Jul-Sep 2010, pp. 12-13.
- "Playing the Game: Polish Taroki" in The Playing-Card, Vol. 40, No. 4, ed. Peter Endebrock, Apr–Jun 2012, pp. 257-260.
- "Playing the Game: Perlaggen – the first UNESCO recognised card game" in The Playing-Card, Vol. 45, No. 1, ed. Peter Endebrock, Jul–Sep 2016, pp. 25–30.
- "Playing the Game: Dreierles" in The Playing-Card, Vol. 47, No. 2, ed. Peter Endebrock, Oct–Dec 2018, pp. 81-84.

== Literature ==
- McLeod, John (2003). "Erinnerungen an Tarockreisen in Europa". In Alscher, Hans-Joachim (ed.). Tarock – mein einziges Vergnügen… Geschichte eines europäischen Kartenspiels. Vienna: Verlag Christian Brandstätter.
- Parlett, David (2008). The Penguin book of card games. London: Penguin. ISBN 978-0-141-03787-5.
