= Pagat.com =

Card rules website

- Website type: static contextual advertising
- Available in: 2 languages
- List of languages * English language: German language
- Founded: 1995
- Owner: John McLeod
- Creator: John McLeod
- Founder: John McLeod
- Editor: John McLeod
- Services: database of card games
- Website: https://www.pagat.com/
- Commercial: No
- Registration: None
- Launched: 1997-07-07
- Current status: Active

Pagat.com is a website containing rules to hundreds of card games from all over the world. Maintained by John McLeod, it contains information for traditional, commercial, and newly invented card games from all over the world. It has been described by writer David Parlett as the most important site of its kind on the Internet and the "only authoritative web site for all rules of card games and associated material."

The site does not provide official rules to "folk games" as none generally exist, but rather reports how the games are actually played. As a consequence, the game articles provide many variants for the described games. The site relies on volunteer contributors from all over the world, and the game articles provide information on where the games are played as described and who has contributed the rules. The site also describes games that are played with domino-style tiles, which, although similar in spirit, are not strictly speaking card games. In addition, the site contains many pages related to card games in general, including a page on the general mechanics of card games.

The word "Pagat" in the website's name is derived from the term given to the lowest ranking trump in Tarock card games such as Königrufen.

David Parlett's book Teach Yourself Card Games recommends the site as the first and probably the only place one needs to seek for rules of card games, and his A-Z of Card Games refers to entries in pagat.com for the rules of those games that are only mentioned in the book.

While the website provides rules for an immense number of card games, some card games can be found on wikipedia that are not listed at pagat.com; it also has links to external game rule sites.
