= Wilhelm Brückner (disambiguation) =

Wilhelm Brückner (1884–1954) was Adolf Hitler's chief adjutant.

Wilhelm Brückner may also refer to:

- Wilhelm Brückner (luthier) (1932–2025), German violin maker
- Wilhelm Brückner-Rüggeberg (1906–1985), German conductor
- Wilhelm Brückner, (c. 1894–1925), German mass murderer, perpetrator of the 1925 Hassenberg murders
