= Karl Denke =

German serial killer (1860–1924)

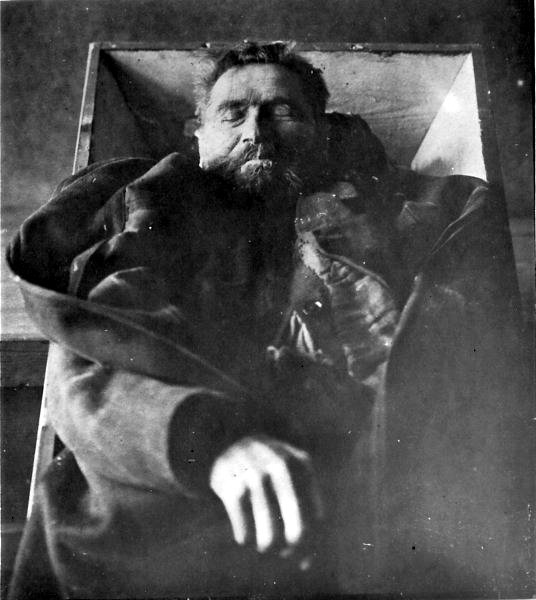
- Denke, photographed shortly after his suicide
- Born: 11 February 1860; Oberkunzendorf, Silesia, Prussia (now Kalinowice Górne, Poland)
- Died: 22 December 1924 (aged 64); Münsterberg, Lower Silesia, Prussia, Weimar Republic (now Ziębice, Poland)
- Cause of death: Suicide by hanging
- Other names: Father Denke; Papa Denke; The Cannibal of Münsterberg; The Forgotten Cannibal
- Motive: Unknown

Details
- Victims: 30–42+
- Span of crimes: 21 February 1903 – 20 December 1924
- Country: German Empire, Weimar Republic
- Date apprehended: 20 December 1924

Karl Denke (11 February 1860 – 22 December 1924) was a German serial killer and cannibal who killed and cannibalized dozens of homeless vagrants and travellers from 1903 to 1924. He has been nicknamed the Cannibal of Münsterberg and the Forgotten Cannibal.

== Early life ==
Denke was born on 11 February 1860 in Oberkunzendorf, north-east of Münsterberg, Silesia, in the Kingdom of Prussia (now Ziębice, Poland), to a family of German farmers. Little is known of Denke's childhood, but it is known that he was often described as a quiet and soft-spoken child who was difficult to raise, being noted as one of the worst students at his elementary school. At the age of 12, Denke ran away from home.

== Later years ==
After graduating from elementary school, Denke became the apprentice of a gardener and made a life for himself. At the age of 25, Denke's father died and his older brother inherited their childhood home, while Denke received a portion of money, which he used to buy a piece of land. Denke tried farming, but this failed and Denke sold it as a result. Denke purchased a house to rent out on what is now Stawowa Street, but inflation forced him to sell it. Denke still refused to move out and lived in a small apartment to the right of the house's ground floor. He acquired a vending licence and ran a nearby shop where he sold goods made from leather and boneless meat (which most speculate to have contained human remains). Denke volunteered as a cross-bearer and organist at the local Lutheran church, and was well-liked in his community, often affectionately referred to as "Papa" by the community. Denke quit his membership in the church in 1906.

== Murders ==
Karl Denke, for unknown reasons, began murdering homeless vagrants and poor travellers. His first known victim was Ida Launer in 1903. Six years later, in 1909, he killed 25-year-old Emma Sander. Eduard Trautmann was found guilty of her murder, but was released in 1926 after the truth was discovered. Denke’s last known victim was Rochus Pawlick. He kept a ledger recording his murders. He is also believed to have sold the pickled flesh of his victims to unsuspecting customers in nearby Breslau, advertised as pork.

== Arrest, suicide, and aftermath ==
On 21 December 1924, Denke lured a homeless drifter named Vincenz Olivier into his home with the promise of twenty pfennig if he wrote a letter for him. Olivier had been directed to Denke by a townswoman, as Denke was known for his charitable nature. According to Olivier, he had sat down at a desk after being handed a pen and paper, but turned to his host after becoming perplexed when Denke dictated "Adolph, du fetter Wanst!" ("Adolph, you fat slob!"), just in time to see him in the process of raising a pickaxe to strike Olivier's head. The victim managed to duck, receiving a deep gash (8 cm in length and 2 cm wide) to the temple before he was able to wrestle the weapon from Denke in the ensuing struggle. Olivier escaped through the front door, screaming that a "madman" was trying to kill him attracting the attention of neighbours, who then alerted the authorities. Initially, Olivier's testimony was disregarded due to Denke's reputation among the townsfolk, leading to his arrest for vagrancy and panhandling. The judge, however, insisted on further investigation of Olivier's claims, whereupon Denke was taken in for questioning. He was placed in a holding cell, where he hanged himself just hours later with an unspecified ligature (the exact nature of which varies from account to account, but most commonly a handkerchief and/or shoelace) before an interrogation could take place. In light of this, Denke's home was searched and police found the gruesome truth of his murders and cannibalism, discovering unidentified flesh that was being cured inside of two tubs filled with brine, a box with an assortment of human bones and human fat stored inside pots. They also discovered several items, including shoes, belts, braces, and shoelaces, that analysis determined were made with tanned human skin. While the exact number of his victims is unknown, Denke's ledger had 31 names recorded (including Olivier, who had escaped), confirming at least 30 victims. However, due to the large number of body parts found in his home, Denke's body count was estimated to be as high as 42 or even higher.

A detailed report of what was found includes:

- sixteen femurs, with one pair of remarkably strong ones, two pairs of very thin ones, six pairs and two left femurs
- fifteen medium-sized pieces of long bones
- four pairs of elbow bones
- seven heads of radii
- nine lower parts of radii
- eight lower parts of the elbow
- a pair of upper shinbone
- a pair of lower elbows and radii, of which extremities still remain well connected
- a pair of upper arms and a pair of upper arm heads
- a pair of collarbones
- two shoulder blades
- eight heels and ankle bones
- 120 toes and phalanx
- 65 feet and metacarpal bones
- five first ribs and 150 pieces of ribs

Decades later, Denke's case remains mostly forgotten. Still much about Denke's life, motives, methods, and the exact number of victims remains unknown. Only two photographs of Denke are known to exist, with the only clear one having been taken after his death.

Spree killer Wilhelm Brückner was found to have had an interest in Denke and Fritz Haarmann's cases, with a note in his workplace reading "Massenmörder Haarmann! Massenmörder Denke! Massenmörder ? ? ?" (Mass murderer Haarmann! Mass murderer Denke! Mass murderer ? ? ?).

== In media ==
- Fritz Lang said in an interview that Denke was among several inspirations for his 1931 thriller film M.
- The film Motel Hell has a resemblance to Denke's case, featuring a farmer who entraps and kills tourists to harvest their flesh for his smoked meats.
- Author Lydia Benecke published a psychological profile of Denke in 2013.
- Casefile covered Denke's case in its 212th episode titled "The Forgotten Cannibal" on 21 May 2022.
- German progressive rock band RPWL mentioned Denke on their track "Another Life Beyond Control" from their 2023 album Crime Scene.
- The German Neue Deutsche Härte band Heldmaschine published a song called "Karl Denke", released as a single.

== See also ==
- List of German serial killers
- List of serial killers by number of victims

== Sources ==
- Sieveking, P. (ed.) (1979) Man bites Man: The Scrapbook of an Edwardian Eccentric, Jay Landesman Limited: London. ISBN 0 905150 15 5.
