= Karl Friedrich Müchler =

German writer

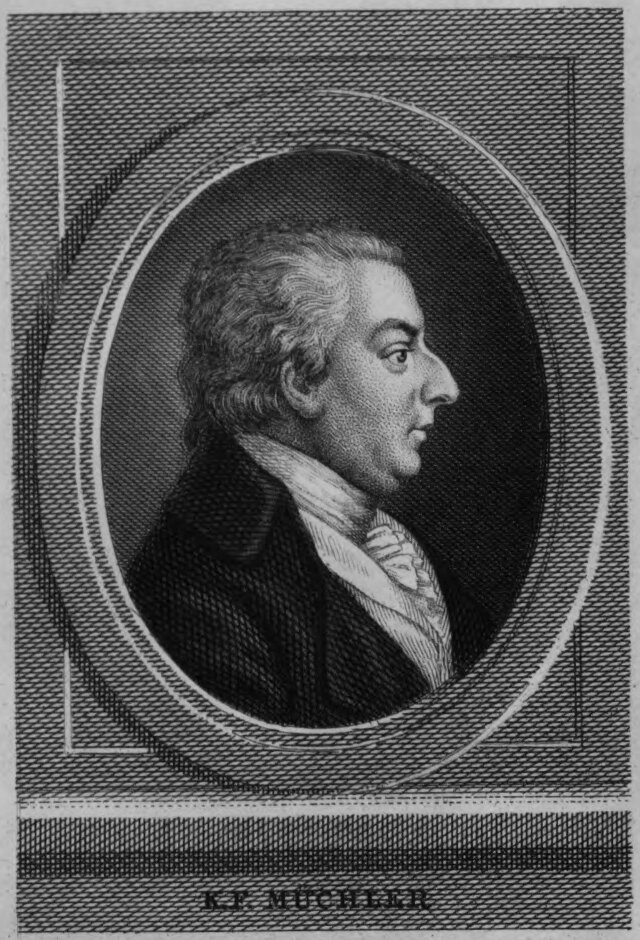
Karl Friedrich Müchler

Karl Friedrich Müchler (2 September 1763 in Stargard in Pommern – 12 January 1857 in Berlin) was a German writer.

== Biography ==
Karl Friedrich Müchler was the son of educator and publicist Johann Georg Müchler. He studied law in Berlin and started a career in the Prussian justice system in 1785. In 1794 he was appointed as a war advisor.

After Prussia's defeat against Napoléon Bonaparte's forces in 1806, Müchler dedicated himself to writing. A convinced Prussian patriot, he wrote educative lyrical poetry and prose. He joined a Masonic Lodge in Berlin.

In 1814, Müchler became the marshal of the general government of Dresden. In the same year, he edited the periodical Das erwachte Europa. He wrote anecdotes, posies, and other educative comical content addressed to youth and women. From 1799 to 1804, he was the husband of author Karoline von Woltmann, née Stosch.

Karl Friedrich Müchler died in 1857 aged 93. He was buried at the Luisenstadt Cemetery in Berlin. His grave has not been preserved. A private school in Dortmund was named after him (the Karl-Müchler-Schule).

== Works ==
- Taschenbuch für alle deutsche Frauen, 1801
- Gedichte, niedergelegt auf dem Altar des Vaterlandes, 1813
- Sittenbilder in Fabeln und Erzählungen für die Jugend, 1829
- (Karl Friedrich Müchler): Anekdotenlexikon für Leser mit Geschmack. 2 vol., 1 supplement vol. Berlin: Siegismund Friedrich Hesse, 1784–85
- Kriminalgeschichten. Aus gerichtlichen Akten gezogen, afterword edited by Alexander Košenina, Hannover: Wehrhahn Verlag, 2011

== Bibliography ==
- Franz Brümmer (1885). "Müchler, Karl". Allgemeine Deutsche Biographie (in German). Vol. 22. Leipzig: Duncker & Humblot. pp. 438–439.
- Ernst Weber (1997). "Müchler, Karl Friedrich". Neue Deutsche Biographie (in German). Vol. 18. Berlin: Duncker & Humblot. pp. 261–262. (full text online).
- Hamberger, Georg Christoph; Meusel, Georg, eds. (1821). "Müchler (K. F.)". Das gelehrte Teutschland – Lexikon der jetzt lebenden teutschen Schriftsteller. Vol. 18. Lemgo. pp. 745–747..
- Košenina, Alexander (2013). Bies, Michael; Gamper, Michael; Kleeberg, Ingrid (eds.). "Kriminalanekdote. Literarisiertes Rechtswissen bei Kleist, Meißner und Müchler". Gattungs-Wissen. Wissenspoetologie und literarische Form (in German). Göttingen: 96–108. doi:10.5771/9783835323346-96..
- Košenina, Alexander (2011). Košenina, Alexander; Zelle, Carsten (eds.). "Anthropologische Kriminalfallgeschichte. Karl Müchlers Diebstahl aus kindlicher Liebe und Goethes Ferdinand-Erzählung". Kleine anthropologische Prosaformen der Goethezeit (1750–1830). Hannover: 255–270.
