= 1925 Hassenberg murders =

Familicide in Thuringia, Germany

- Location: Hassenberg, Bavaria, and Lindenberg, Thuringia, Germany
- Date: 6–7 June 1925 c. 23:00 – c. 4:00 (CET)
- Target: Family members
- Attack type: Mass stabbing
- Weapons: Axe; Kitchen knife Iron rod
- Deaths: 10 (including an unborn child)
- Injuries: 1
- Perpetrator: Wilhelm Brückner
- Motive: Delusions, possibly infamy

On the night of 6–7 June 1925, a mass stabbing took place in Hassenberg, Bavaria, Germany. After murdering his wife in nearby Lindenberg, the perpetrator, 31-year-old Wilhelm Brückner, killed eight members of his family, including his mother, before committing suicide.

An investigation determined that Brückner was mentally ill and had likely acted out due to delusional beliefs and imagined conflicts regarding his family.

== Murders ==
=== Lindenberg ===
In the late hours of 6 June 1925, Brückner rode his bicycle from Hassenberg to Lindenberg, arriving there at about 23:00 after a two-hour trip to lurk outside the house of his separated wife Karoline Birnstiel and her parents. Brückner had followed his brother-in-law, 19-year-old Hugo Birnstiel, to the house, presumably observing him and Karoline for a while there, before returning to the road to intercept Hugo. Brückner accompanied him for a while until they arrived at a wooded area, when Brückner ordered Hugo to check out a noise he claimed to have heard while passing by earlier. Just after stepping into the treeline, Brückner took out a piece of iron and severely injured Hugo by hitting him in the back of the head. Hugo was able to escape and find shelter in the grain mill of Rotheul.

Brückner then returned to Lindenberg and lured Karoline out into the yard, where he deeply slashed her throat. Brückner fled, but the attack was overheard by Karoline's father, with Karoline running back inside and dying of the neck wound in her father's arms. Lindenberg's gendarmerie was notified and quickly identified Brückner through a jacket he left behind, recognised as belonging to him by Karoline's father.

=== Hassenberg ===
Brückner passed through Wörlsdorf at around 1:30, arriving back in Hassenberg a few minutes later, where he entered his residence at the house of his sister Wilhelmine and her husband Eduard Rosenbauer. On the ground floor, Brückner killed all five of their children – four girls aged 2, 10, 16 and 19 years, and a boy aged 8 – by crushing the top of their skulls and stabbing some of them as the siblings were sleeping in a shared room. On the first floor, Brückner killed his sister, brother-in-law and his own mother in their sleep, bludgeoning them in the same manner and also slitting their throats in two rooms. Eduard Rosenbauer was described as having been mutilated. Brückner then washed his hands clean off blood with a bowl and a rag, also washing the bodies of his mother and Ilse Brückner. Afterwards, Brückner committed suicide by hanging himself at his mother's bed.

Gendarmerie arrived in Hassenberg by car shortly before 4 a.m. and after a brief stop at the police station, the police vehicle stopped in front of the house. Finding the front door locked, the officers entered through a window on the ground floor and found all eight inhabitants and Brückner dead. The murder weapons were found to have been an axe taken from the house and a kitchen knife hidden in one of Brückner's boots.

=== Victims ===
The victims consisted of Brückner's ex-wife, his mother, his sister, his brother-in-law, four nieces and a nephew.

- Karoline Birnstiel
- Margarete Barbara Brückner, 71
- Wilhelmine Karoline Rosenbauer, 41
- Eduard Rosenbauer, 44
- Ilse Brückner
- Emmy Brückner

== Perpetrator ==
Brückner had been a life-long resident of Hassenberg, formerly an independent village in Saxe-Coburg and Gotha, now part of Sonnefeld. Around 1905, when he was about 10 years old, Brückner and his father were struck by lightning. His father was killed while he himself was left unconscious, and it was said that the incident caused a change of his character. During World War I, he was conscripted repeatedly, but was discharged each time due to suspicions of mental illness, the last and final time in 1917. Through prolonged observation, evaluators had ruled out the possibility of malingering. Brückner worked as a basket maker, the most widespread occupation in his village, and was described as an irritable but otherwise tidy and diligent worker.

Brückner's first wife divorced him several years earlier, citing "religious differences". His second wife Karoline no longer wanted to live with Brückner and refused requests to return to him. Two days before the murders, she had confided in friends of her fears that her husband would kill her someday. Karoline related a possible poisoning attempt several week earlier, when she ate chocolate given to her by Brückner, which caused her abdominal pains and made her rule out a continued relationship with him. It was also found that he had already stalked the house of his wife a few days earlier in late May. Neighbours stated that he had lingered outside at midnight for one-and-a-half hours while wielding an axe before returning to his bike while loudly uttering obscenities. In another stalking incident, Brückner had poisoned his wife's dog. In the past, Brückner was suspected of having killed his sister-in-law in 1923.

At the time of the murders Brückner lived, together with his mother, at the house of his sister and her husband, and was said to have argued with them frequently. However, he apparently kept a good relationship with his mother and another relative, Ilse Brückner. Brückner's one-year-old daughter was living with her grandparents.

== Investigation ==
The Landeskriminalamt of Thuringia took jurisdiction over the case. The investigation was completed by the state prosecutor's office of Landgerichtsbezirk Coburg in late July. In a trouser pocket of Brückner's body, officers found black peppercorns, commonly used by criminals at the time to contaminate crime scenes, leading them to believe that Brückner initially planned to escape and hide traces of his presence. Police assume that the suicide was a spontaneous decision made to avoid criminal prosecution, with Neuste Zeitung noting that Brückner's body was still warm on arrival and speculating that he killed himself when hearing the police car. A search of Brückner's belongings found a second blackjack, some handgun bullets, and literature about "wizards and witches, devilish hauntings and ghost evocations". A closet also contained books in 14 languages and an "oracle book", while hidden underneath the floorboards were two Himmelsbriefe, described as letters written by mediums to be carried near one's chest as a charm.

Mental imbalance was immediately suspected. Although his family lacked a history of psychiatric illness, locals confirmed that Brückner was always seen as an outsider and loner prone to daydreaming. However, outside of his temper and argumentative nature, he was not considered mentally abnormal. Brückner left a letter on a table in his room, voicing a hatred for his brothers-in-law Hugo Birnstiel and Eduard Rosenbauer. He accused Hugo of having an incestuous relationship with his own sister (Brückner's wife) and implied that her pregnancy was a result of this, also claiming that Eduard "lived like a savage" and had been regularly in conflict with Brückner over some geese. However, authorities did not believe that the contents of the letters had any foundation in reality since both men had good reputations in the area.

Another motive discussed was attention seeking, specifically a "lust for sensationalism". Police discovered after the murders that Brückner had an interest in contemporary murderers, with a particular preoccuaption with serial killer Fritz Haarmann, who had recently been executed. It was stated that he had sketched the murderer's head and studied crime magazines about the case in detail. Police also found a note at his workplace reading "Massenmörder Haarmann! Massenmörder Denke! Massenmörder ? ? ?" ("Mass murderer Haarmann! Mass murderer Denke! Mass murderer ? ? ?") in reference to Fritz Haarmann and Karl Denke, another serial killer whose crimes made headlines at that time. Media also noted parallels to a similar familicide in Haiger in neighbouring Hesse, perpetrated by Fritz Angerstein, six months earlier. Local Hassenberg residents recalled that Brückner had already made foreboding comments for a longer period of time, once saying "Dieses Haus bekommen einmal fremde Leute" ("This house will one day belong to strangers") and on the day before the murders, Brückner told his nieces, who wanted to attend the Sunday Kirchweih, "Ihr geht mir morgen nicht aus dem Haus" ("You're not leaving the house tomorrow").

The investigation concluded that Brückner was affected by hysteria, epilepsy, and feeble-mindedness, based on the findings in his military medical record. It is thought that these conditions caused Brückner to build up rage and feelings of vengeance, misconstrue minor conflicts into personal attacks, and experience non-existent stimuli. His motive was vengeance for the reasons listed in Brückner's final letter, which were fabrications of his own mind, having mostly likely heard imaginary conversations between his wife and her brother that made him believe they had a relationship. His minor arguments with Eduard Rosenbauer were believed to have been real, but exaggerated in significance by Brückner. Investigators believed that Brückner saw the murder of his family as a method of redemption for the supposed incest and adultery as well as other imagined transgressions. However, it could not be determined if Brückner was aware of his actions or acted in a postictal state, though the statements made by Brückner before the murders indicated premeditation. Brückner's brain was given to the University of Erlangen for study and possible confirmation of physical anomalies.

=== Misinformation ===
An early slightly erroneous account of the events in Lindenburg claimed that Brückner first killed his wife in Lindenberg, inaccurately describing that her death was initially unnoticed. The attempted murder on Hugo Birnstiel is also described differently, taking place after Karoline Birnstiel's murder and has Hugo left unconscious from the attack, also describing the police response as coming from Neuhaus rather than Lindenberg.

While the investigation was still ongoing, Neuste Tageblatt claimed that there were suspicions about potential accomplices in the murders. The newspaper wrote that witnesses recalled seeing light in an upper floor room at about 1:30, only achievable through the carrying of a hand-held lamp. Since it was assumed that Brückner was already in the house by then and in the process of killing his family, it was considered unlikely that he could have held the axe, with which most of the victims were killed, and a lamp at the same time, thus it was theorised that a second person was holding the lamp during this time. Neuste Tageblatt claimed that Brückner's mother Margarete would be the most likely accomplice, despite having also been killed by her son, claiming that unlike the other victims, she had been found lying across her bed and that her body was still warm when found, noting that she wore an underskirt instead of nightwear. The newspaper also implicated an unspecified, still-living relative as also being suspected of involvement. Neuste Tagebatt retracted the previous claims as incorrect the following week, stating that neither Margarete Brückner or any living person was involved, denouncing the spread of unfounded rumours, and publishing the correct crime scene details. The newspaper also addressed another claim that Ilse Brückner was shot in the head, clarifying that while Brückner owned a gun, it was found unused in his room.

Coburg officials stated in their ultimate findings that Brückner acted alone. Investigators had always ruled out the unnamed relative and also confirmed that none of the dead could have aided Brückner in the murders. Regarding the details about Brückner's mother, the report specified that she was found in the same position in bed as the other victims and that two other of the women were also wearing extra clothing in a manner consistent with common habit. The investigation was not able to determine if Brückner had actually used the lamp found on the scene, but noted there was space to set down the lamp inside the rooms.

== Aftermath ==
The perpetrator's remains were buried in an unmarked grave behind a morgue. The eight Hassenberg victims were buried on 10 June on a cemetery in Gestungshausen. The funeral was observed by hundreds of attendants, both locals and those who had travelled over to pay their respects. Sonnefeld's school, which most of the deceased children attended, honored their former students in a wreath ceremony by their teachers while the burial was accompanied by funeral hymns sung by the choirs of the village and the school. Most of the remaining members of the three affected family were also present, including survivor Hugo Birnstiel and another Brückner sister, who fainted during the service. During the eulogy, Gestungshausen chapel superintendent Alwin Sellner held a speech urging community members to remember the victims and see the killings as a call to self-reflection. Coburger Zeitung commented on the potential motive of infamy, writing "a glorious memory won't be granted to the fiend".

In addition to the already highly publicised serial killings of Fritz Haarmann and mass murder in Haiger, the Hassenberg murders occurred during a heightened political climate amidst negotiations with the UK for the Locarno Treaties and increasing hostilities against Germans and other foreign nationals in China during the Thirtieth May movement. Coupled with a general increase in violent crime, interest in the Hassenberg murders was waning by 12 June, when it was overshadowed by the apparent lust murder of Alma Söllner, followed by suspicions of serial killings after the additional discovery of the bodies of Rosa Reis and two other women in nearby Sonneberg, which were later tied to a mentally disabled man, Bruno Lüdke, who became regarded as an innocent scapegoat framed by the later Nazi government.

On 17 June, a master tailor from Kölleda offered to buy the former Rosenbauer residence to use as his studio.

Freies Wort wrote in 2021 that despite initial widespread reporting, the Hassenberg murders ultimately became only a "talk of the day" event in both the news cycle and local history.

== See also ==
- List of mass stabbings in Germany
