= Damen Conversations Lexikon =

German conversation lexikon

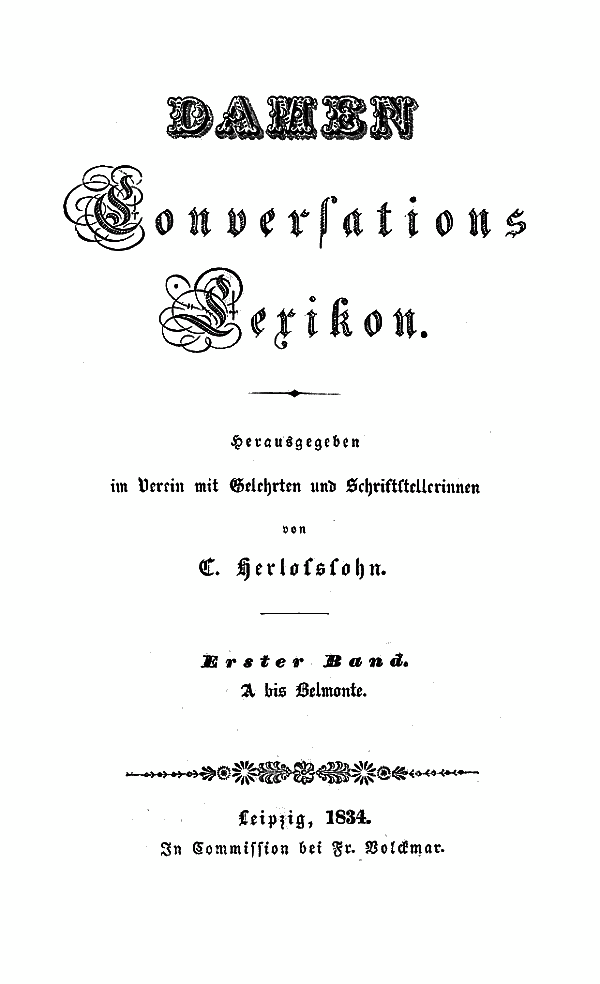
Title page of the first volume

The Damen Conversations Lexikon is a 10-volume Konversationslexikon (de; a type of dictionary, with encyclopedic explanations) from the 19th century, which at the time of publication was aimed primarily at German women of the bourgeoisie who were interested in education.

== History ==
At the beginning of the 1830s, the German book market offered around 50 encyclopaedic works that dealt with a wide range of special subjects and were aimed at different target groups. For example, there was the Große Conversations-Lexikon by Joseph Meyer, which was aimed at the educated classes and was distributed in individual volumes. The writer Carl Herloßsohn, who came from a poor background, relied on a similar concept by starting to publish the Damen Conversations Lexikon in 1834. In doing so, he counted on the interest of women of the bourgeoisie who were hungry for education. Each volume consisted of four issues. In 1838, the tenth volume was completed. The contributors included Karoline von Woltmann, who, for example, wrote an article on "Marriage". Contributions from the field of music are said to have come from Robert Schumann in the first two volumes. The side pages of the title pages to the individual volumes were decorated with steel engravings of famous women, which were by Moritz Retzsch.

In the preface to the first volume it says:

- To grasp the female interest in all its aspects, to examine the useful, the beautiful, the worth knowing in the minds of women and to make it vivid, to let it pass in a lighter, more tasteful garb than in other lexicographical works, to choose a form that would satisfy the judges of taste without sacrificing anything to the most noble and dignified position that the work is destined to occupy, this was the task that we intended to solve.

A digitized version appeared (in new typesetting and facsimile) in the Digital Library series and was made available free of charge on the Zeno.org portal. This reproduces the full text of the printed edition unchanged with a word-for-word page concordance. In 1856, the work Neuestes Damen-Conversations-Lexikon: ein Inbegriff des Gesammtwissens für die Frauenwelt appeared, which was also printed in Leipzig and aimed at the same target group.

== Volumes ==
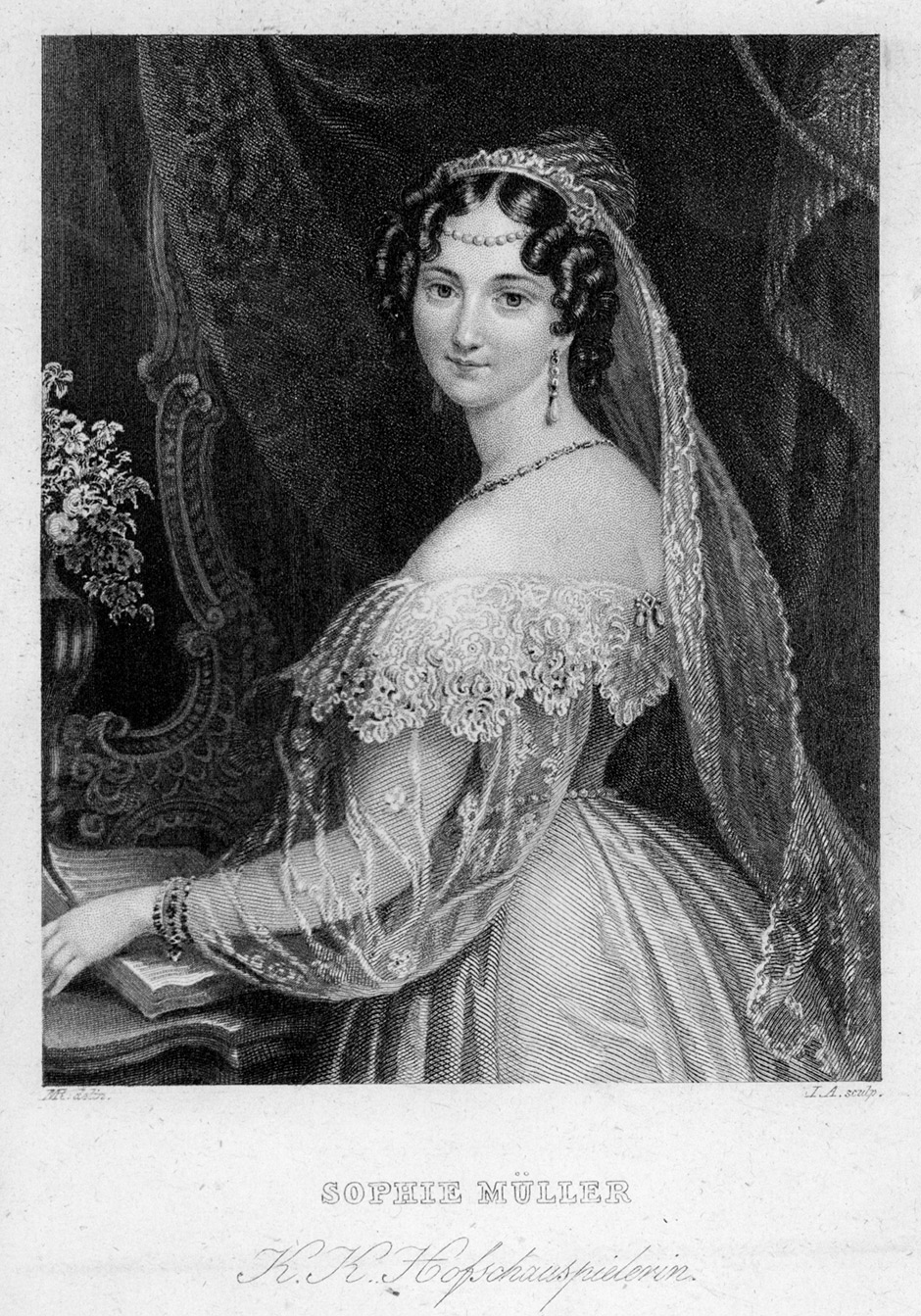
Hofschauspielerin Sophie Müller (Moritz Retzsch) vol.7

Published in association with women scholars and writers

- Vol 1: A bis Belmonte. 1834 (zeno.org or books.google.com).
- Vol 2: Belt bis Corday (Charlotte). 1834 (zeno.org or books.google.com).
- Vol 3: Cordilleras bis Esel. 1835 (zeno.org or books.google.com).
- Vol 4: Eskimo bis Grätz. 1835 (zeno.org or books.google.com).
- Vol 5: Graubündten bis Italien (Geschichte). 1835 (zeno.org or books.google.de).
- Vol 6: Italien (Frauen) bis Majo. 1836 (zeno.org or books.google.de).
- Vol 7: Majoran bis Ohrenzwang. 1836 (zeno.org or books.google.de).
- Vol 8: Ohrringe bis Rübe. 1837 (zeno.org or books.google.com).
- Vol 9: Rubens bis Tabernakel. 1837 (zeno.org or books.google.com).
- Vol 10: Tableaux bis Zwischenact. 1838 (zeno.org or books.google.com).
