= Viennese Grosstarock =

Austrian three-player card game

Viennese Grosstarock is a modern, three-player Austrian card game of the Tarock family that emerged in Vienna during the 1950s and 1960s. The game died out in the 1970s, but was revived in 2004 and further developed.

== Description ==
Viennese Grosstarock is a Tarock card game for three-players played with a 54-card Tarock pack. The name, which means 'big tarock', refers to the size of the pack which was larger than the 40-card pack used for the more common game of Zwanzigerrufen. In the same way, the name 'Grosstarock' was used in the 19th-century to refer to the original 78-card game at a time when the 54-card game was introduced and spreading throughout Austria and into Germany. However, the two games are not directly related.

Unique features of the Viennese Grosstarock include its "idiosyncratic method of counting the cards" and the ability of an opponent to pick up the declarer's discards and play a higher contract.

== Bibliography ==
- Dummett, Michael; McLeod, John (2009). A History of Games Played with the Tarot Pack: Supplement. Oxford: Maproom.
