= Void (cards) =

Card game terminology

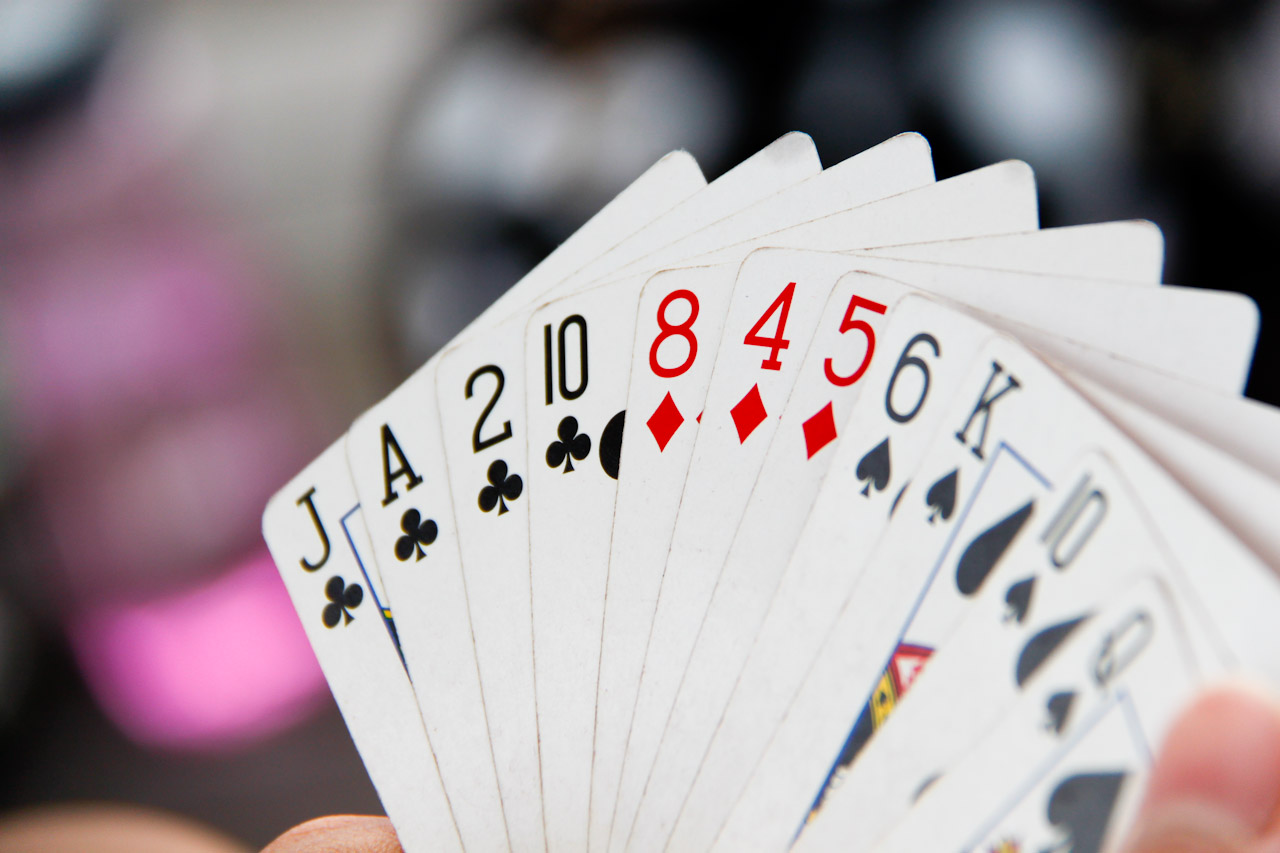
A hand void of hearts

In card games, to be void in a suit of cards is to not have cards of that suit in one's hand. This is useful in games such as bridge. For instance, one player can lead with the suit in which his partner is void so as to give a ruff.
