= Carl Herloßsohn =

German author, journalist and encyclopaedist

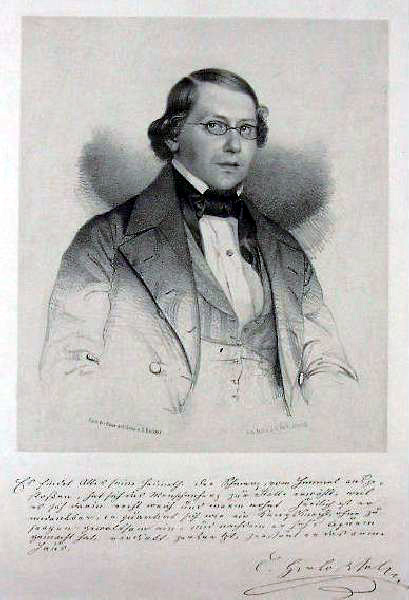
Carl Herloßsohn

Carl Herloßsohn or Karl Herloßsohn (actually Borromäus Sebastian Georg Carl Reginald Herloß, 1804–1849) was a German author, journalist and encyclopaedist.

== Life ==
Herloßsohn was born on 1 September 1804 at the Kleinseite in Prague into a poor background as the son of a tailor. He attended Kleinseite Grammar School from 1813, went to Prague University in 1820 and then to Vienna in 1821 to find a better life there. Zacharias Werner tried in vain to persuade Herloßsohn to join the order of the Redemptorists. Herloßsohn returned to Prague at the beginning of 1822, continued his law studies and published his first poetic works in the Dresden daily, the Dresdner Abend-Zeitung. In November 1823, he became tutor to Johann Prochaska, director of the Propsteigut Dejwitz near Prague, and worked temporarily in the Dejwitz judicial office. In November 1825, he moved to Leipzig to secure his livelihood as a writer. Herloßsohn became a translator, worked for the Brockhaus Literarisches Conversationsblatt, a literary journal, and wrote for various, mainly belletristic, papers. In 1826 his first work was published, Die Fünfhundert vom Blanik, und die Sylvesternacht. In 1830, he founded the magazine Der Komet, "an entertainment journal for the educated literary world", which with its numerous supplements (including the Zeitung für Reisen und Reisende, 1830–1836; Der Dampfwagen, 1834; Der Luftballon, 1835–1836; Telescop, 1843–1847) is one of the influential and critical works of literature in the pre-revolutionary period known as the Vormärz. Herloßsohn edited the magazine for nineteen years, finally having to give up in the revolutionary year of 1848. Herloßsohn died impoverished in the St. James' Hospital in Leipzig on 10 December 1849.

Herloßsohn wrote numerous poems and songs, some of which became very popular in the 19th century. His poem Wenn die Schwalben heimwärts ziehn was set to music several times including by Robert Schumann. He also wrote numerous novels and short stories, including several historical novels from the period of the Thirty Years' War and the Hussite Wars, which were translated into Czech because of their Hussite-friendly sentiments. His satirical, critical prose is remarkable. Like Wilhelm Hauff, Herloßsohn parodied Heinrich Clauren by publishing the novel Emmy oder der Mensch denkt, Gott lenkt under his name in 1827. He also mocked Clauren's plays in 1827 in Der Luftballon oder die Hundstage in Schilda. His Löschpapiere aus dem Tagebuch eines reisenden Teufels (2 vols., 1827/28) or the almanac Mephistopheles, a political-satirical paperback for the year 1833, published with Johann Peter Lyser, caused a stir.

From 1834 to 1838, Herloßsohn published the Damen Conversations Lexikon (10 vols.) together with the publisher von der Lühe. He was able to win over Robert Schumann to edit the musical entries. From 1839 to 1842, he published together with Hermann Marggraff and Robert Blum the Allgemeines Theaterlexicon or encyclopedia of "everything worth knowing for stage performers, amateurs and theatre fans with the participation of Germany's most knowledgeable writers" in seven volumes.

In Leipzig, a street is named after Herloßsohn, which leads from the district of Gohlis-South to the Rosental area. The small bridge that crosses the Parthe here is called Herloßsohnsteg.

== Works ==
- Vier Farben, das heißt: die deutschen Spielkarten in ihrer symbolischen Bedeutung beschrieben und erklärt von Susanna Rümpler, Kartenschlägerin. Leipzig, 1828.
- Hahn und Henne. Liebesgeschichte zweier Thiere. Leipzig, 1830.
- Kometenstrahlen. Eine Sammlung von Erzählungen, ernsten und humoristischen Aufsätzen. 2 vols. Leipzig, 1833 and 1847.
- Zeit und Lebensbilder. Novellen, Humoresken, Ironien und Reflexionen. 6 vols. Leipzig, 1839–1843
- Wanderungen durch das Riesengebirge und die Grafschaft Glatz. Leipzig, 1840.
- Böhmen von 1414 bis 1426. Historisch-romantisches Gemälde in 2 Abtheilungen. 4 vols. Leipzig, 1841 (later title: Die Hussiten oder Böhmen von 1414 bis 1426)
- Buch der Liebe. [Gedichte.] Leipzig, 1842.
- Fahrten und Abenteuer des M[agisters] Gaudelius Enzian. Komischer Roman. 2 vols. Leipzig, 1842.
- Wallensteins erste Liebe. 3 vols., Hanover, 1844.
- Die Tochter des Piccolomini. 3 vols. Altenburg, 1846.
- Arabella oder Geheimnisse eines Hoftheaters. 2 vols. Leipzig, 1846.
- Die Mörder Wallensteins. 3 vols. Leipzig, 1847.
- Buch der Lieder. Leipzig, 1848.
- Historische Romane. Erste Gesammtausgabe. 8 divisions each of 2 vols. Prague, 1863–1865.
- Gesammelte Schriften. Erste Gesammtausgabe. 12 vols. Prague, 1865–1868.

== Literature ==
- Constantin von Wurzbach: "Herloßsohn, Georg Karl Reginald." In: Biographisches Lexikon des Kaiserthums Oesterreich (Biographical Lexicon of the Empire of Austria). Part 8 Kaiserlich-königliche Hof- und Staatsdruckerei, Vienna 1862, p. 370–377 (digitalised).
- Ernst Kelchner (1880). "Herloßsohn, Georg Karl Reginald" . Allgemeine Deutsche Biographie (in German). Vol. 12. Leipzig: Duncker & Humblot. pp. 118–120.
- Jan Patrick Müller: Literaturmarkt, Schreiben und Publizieren im Prosawerk Karl Herloßsohns (1802–1849). Bielefeld: Aisthesis Verl. 2015. (Forum Vormärz Forschung. Vormärz-Studien. XXXVII.) ISBN 978-3-8498-1085-6
