= Karoline von Woltmann =

German writer

Karoline von Woltmann, née Stosch (6 March 1782 – 18 November 1847 in Berlin) was a German author who also wrote under the pseudonym Luise Berg. She was regarded by her contemporaries as "the German Genlis".

== Biography ==
Born in Berlin, Karoline was the eldest daughter of physician and Prussian secret advisor Karl Wilhelm Stosch and of Auguste Stosch, née Hönig. She developed an interest in literature at an early age.

At the age of 17, she married poet and war advisor Karl Müchler. They separated in 1804, but in the same year Karoline met the author Karl Ludwig von Woltmann, whom she married on 25th October 1805. Around 1804, she wrote her first novel, Euphrosyne, which was later reworked with Karl Ludwig von Woltmann and published under the title Heloise. Then she wrote a few works and worked with her husband. In 1813 they moved to Prague, where Karoline translated several works of Maria Edgeworth. After Karl Ludwig von Woltmann stopped writing because of a right-arm paralysis, his wife edited his works. He died in 1817.

In the same year, Karoline von Woltmann wrote a supplement to Karl Ludwig's autobiography and started publishing his Sämmtlichen Werke in 14 volumes until 1827. In 1824, she became an editor of the Prague-based periodical Der Kranz, where her works were also published. Two years later she went back to Germany and lived in Berlin, where she died in 1847. She travelled to Italy and Switzerland in 1832 and 1833.

== Published works ==
- Euphrosyne (1804, re-worked and published as Heloise in 1809)
- Karl und Karoline von Woltmanns Schriften (5 volumes, 1806–07)
  - Band 1: Erzählungen (1806)
  - Band 2: Erzählungen (1806)
  - Band 3: Blätter der Liebe (1806)
  - Band 4: Gedichte (1807)
  - Band 5: Lebensbeschreibungen (1807)
- Orlando (1815)
- Volkssagen der Böhmen (2 volumes, 1815) online
- Maria und Walpurgis (1817)
- Neue Volkssagen der Böhmen (1820) online
- Historische Darstellungen zu mehrerer individuellen Kenntniß der Zeiten und Personen (1820)
- Über Beruf, Verhältnis, Tugend und Bildung der Frauen (1820)
- Die weissen Hüthe (1822)
- Der Ultra und der Liberale (1824)
- Spiegel der großen Welt und ihrer Forderungen (1824)
- Die Bildhauer (1829)
- Die weiße Frau (1832)
- Das Erbe (1832)
- Deutsche Briefe. Woltmanns Briefwechsel mit Goethe und anderen Freunden (as editor, 1834)
- Menschen und Gegenden. Vol. 1: Deutschland und die Schweiz (1835)

=== Newspaper and magazine articles ===
- Frühlingsgesang der Deutschen (in Kronos, 1813)
- Genebald (in Berliner Damenkalender auf das Jahr 1816)
- Das Glück der Entfernten (in Morgenblatt, 1820)
- Des Tages Wiederkehr (in Aglaja, 1822)
- Ein Fragment aus Byron Childe Harold, Mai, Fragment aus dem Werke über Natur, Bestimmung, Tugend und Bildung der Frauen, Über Freundschaftsverhältnisse und Gedichte (in Der Kranz, 1823)
- Sinnigkeit (in Abendzeitung, 1824)

=== Translations ===
- Maria Edgeworth: Denkwürdigkeiten des Grafen von Glenthorn (1814)
- Maria Edgeworth: Schleichkünste (1814)
- Jean-Nicolas Bouilly: Geschichten für junge Frauen (1820)

== Bibliography ==
- Carl Wilhelm Otto August von Schindel (1825). Die deutschen Schriftstellerinnen des 19. Jahrhunderts (in German). Leipzig: F. A. Brockhaus. pp. 452–457.
- Constantin von Wurzbach (1889). "Woltmann, Karoline". Biographisches Lexikon des Kaiserthums Oesterreich (in German). Vol. 58. Vienna: Kaiserlich-königliche Hof- und Staatsdruckerei. pp. 100–102.
- Max Mendheim (1898). "Woltmann, Karoline von". Allgemeine Deutsche Biographie (in German). Vol. 44. Leipzig: Duncker & Humblot. pp. 190–191.
- Brigitte Leuschner, ed. (1999). Der Briefwechsel zwischen Therese Huber (1764–1829) und Karoline von Woltmann (1782–1847). Ein Diskurs über Schreiben und Leben (in German). Marburg: Tectum.
