= Coburger Zeitung =

Defunct German newspaper

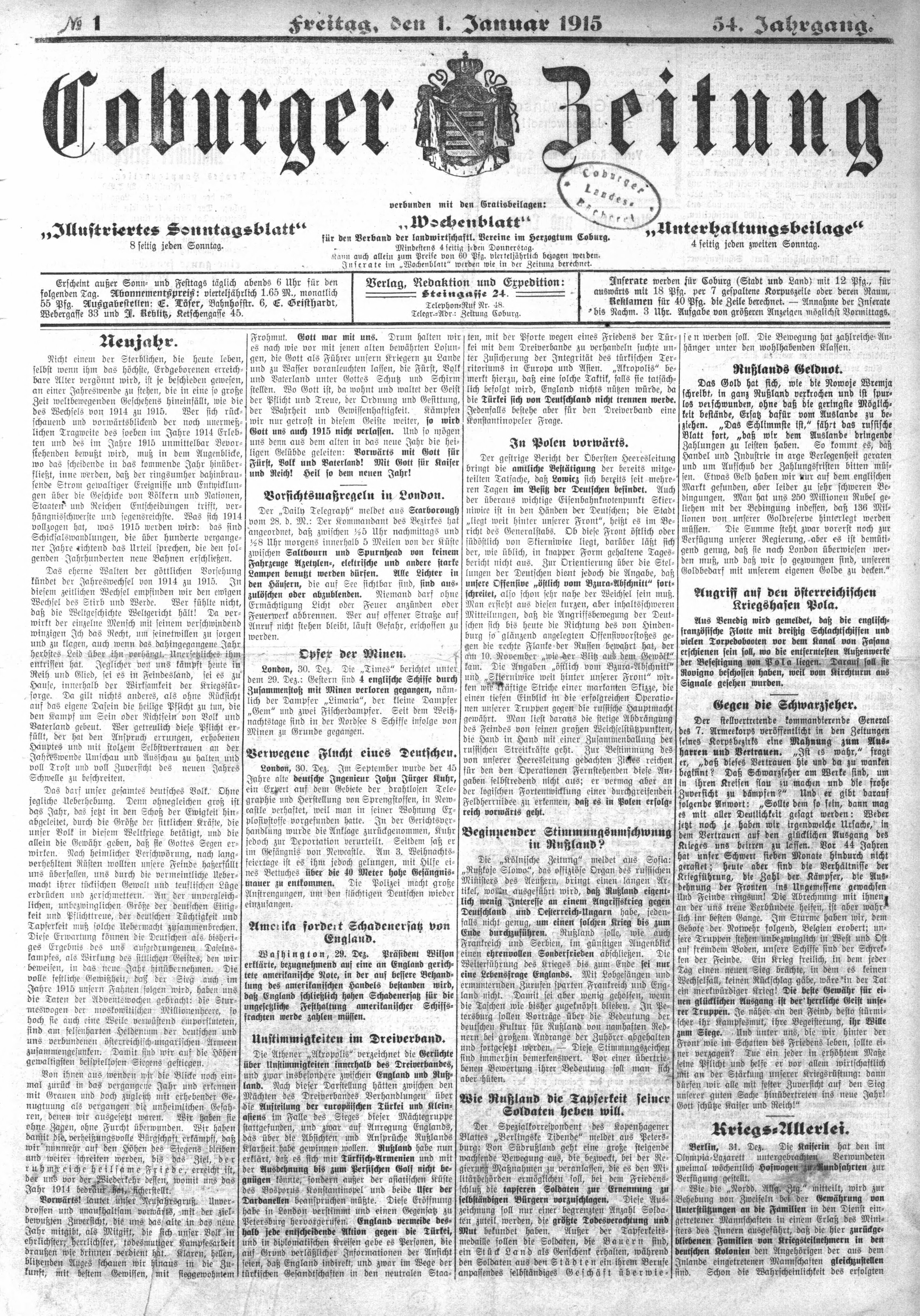
- The first page of the 1 January 1915 issue of the Coburger Zeitung
- Type: Daily newspaper
- Founded: 1851
- Ceased publication: 1935
- Political alignment: Conservative
- Language: German
- City: Coburg, Bavaria, Germany
- OCLC number: 163639829
- Free online archives: Munich Digitalization Center

The Coburger Zeitung was a German-language daily newspaper servicing Coburg, Bavaria, Germany. It was first published in 1854, and then again from 1861 to 1935. Its issues were printed in Dornheim. It was described as being politically conservative. The newspaper ceased publication in 1935 after competition with the Coburger Nationalzeitung, a Nazi-affiliated newspaper. It and all other Coburg newspapers were either closed down or incorporated into that paper during the process of Gleichschaltung.

== History ==
The paper was first published in 1854, before ceasing. It began again in 1861. During its existence, the paper serviced the German city of Coburg. It was a daily newspaper, and its issues were printed in Dornheim. It was described as being politically conservative. Its description of itself was Vereinsorgan der Verbandes der landwirtschaftlichen Vereine für das Coburger Land. German historian and author Rudolph Genée was an editor of the paper from 1861 to 1864.

During the Weimar era, the paper functioned as a something of a mouthpiece for the German National People's Party; the paper was nationalist leaning, and after the signing of the Treaty of Versailles bemoaned it as "the crushing peace treaty". During the rise of the Nazi party in Germany, the paper enthusiastically reported on the nationalist atmosphere in Germany at the time and relevant events; it, with the Coburger Tageblatt (also center right) focused more on the cultural aspects and not the disorderly elements of the Nazi influence in Coburg, compared to socialist papers.

In 1924, the Völkische Block (an alliance of several right leaning nationalist groups) announced its political aims in the paper, declaring their desire for the removal of civil rights from Jews and decrying miscegenation. The newspaper ceased publication in 1935 after competition with the Coburger Nationalzeitung, a newspaper affiliated with the Gau Bayreuth. It and all other Coburg newspapers were either closed down or incorporated into the Coburger Nationalzeitung during the process of Gleichschaltung.
