= Cancellation Hearts =

Card game

- A variant of Black Lady for 6 or more players
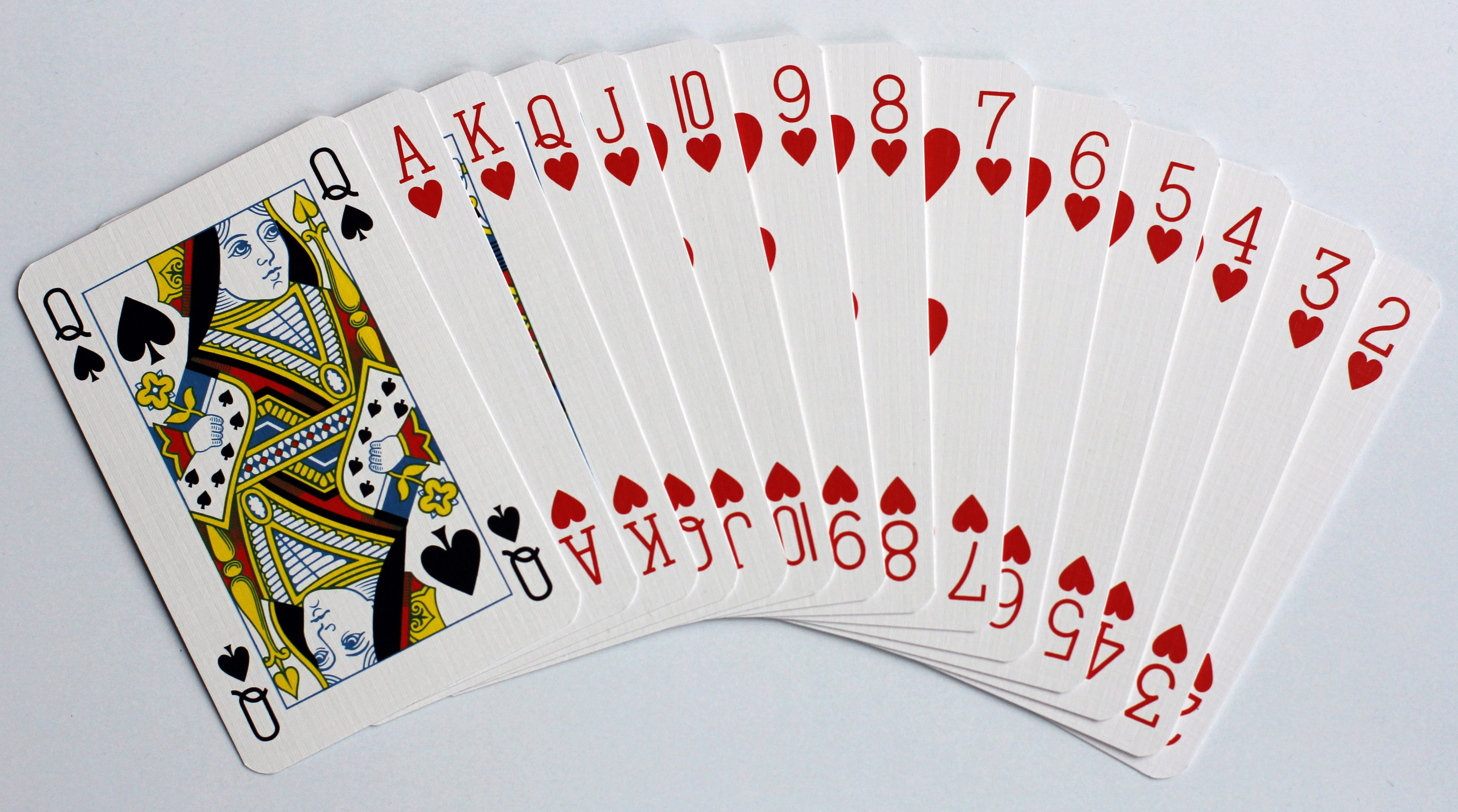
- The penalty cards in Cancellation Hearts (each card occurs twice)
- Origin: Polignac, Reversis, Four Jacks
- Type: Trick-taking
- Players: 5-11
- Skills: Card counting, Tactics, Teamwork
- Cards: 2 packs of 52 cards each
- Deck: French
- Rank (high→low): A K Q J 10 9 8 7 6 5 4 3 2, no trump
- Play: Clockwise
- Playing time: 10 minutes per hand
- Chance: Low – moderate

Related games
- Black Lady, Black Maria, Hearts
- Aim: Avoid capturing Hearts or the Q♠

Cancellation Hearts is a variant of Hearts for six or more players.

With a large number of players Hearts can be played with two packs. This allows each player to hold more cards and gives a four-person feel to the game. However, this means that there are two of each card and can lead to confusion about which is the highest card to take the trick. The normal convention when playing with two decks is that identical cards cancel each other out. For example, if hearts is lead, and both Aces (of Hearts) are played, then they cancel each other out (yet still count as points) and the next highest card takes the trick. If all the cards on that trick are either cancelled out or do not follow the suit, the whole trick is cancelled and the cards are given to whoever takes the next trick. If the trick happens to be the last one of the hand, then the trick is won by the player who led it (regardless of the card he/she played).

This double-pack variation also adds a strategy often called "The Aardvark", in which a player leads the queen of spades hoping that the other player holding the queen of spades will also play it, thus cancelling them out from being the highest cards, and giving 26 points to the unfortunate player who takes the trick.

== Rules for different numbers of players ==
Each player must have exactly the same number of cards, and there must be a unique card to determine who leads the first trick. These two requirements mean a joker must be added and/or one or more deuces removed, depending on the number of players.

| Rules No. of players | Cards | | | | First trick led by |
| Rules No. of players | Added | Removed | Total no. | Per player | First trick led by |
|---|---|---|---|---|---|
| 5 | one joker | - | 105 | 21 | joker |
| 6 | - | one 2♣, one 2♦ | 102 | 17 | 2♣ |
| 7 | one joker | - | 105 | 15 | joker |
| 8 | one joker | one 2♣ | 104 | 13 | joker |
| 9 | - | one 2♣, both 2♦, both 2♠ | 99 | 11 | 2♣ |
| 10 | - | one 2♣, both 2♦, one 2♠ | 100 | 10 | 2♣ |
| 11 | - | one 2♣, both 2♦, both 2♠ | 99 | 9 | 2♣ |

Alternatively, an 11-player game could be played with 154 cards (three packs of 52, excluding two 2♣). Each player gets 14 cards and the first trick is started with the remaining 2♣.

When the joker is in play, it is usually treated like a "zero of clubs" (i.e. the lowest club); this means that when the joker is played, all other players must follow in that suit, and the joker itself cannot win the trick due to its low value (unless all the other cards in the trick cancel out).

There is no general rule about the number of cards passed before the start of the hand. A possible rule is to pass no more than a quarter of the total number of cards in hand (i.e. five for 5 players, four for 6 players, three for 7-8 players and two for 9-11 players).

== Kitty variation ==
Instead of adding a joker, or removing specific cards from the deck, some players of Cancelation Hearts prefer to deal a number of cards facedown to the center of the table until the deck splits evenly between all players. This "Kitty", sometimes known as the pot, or the blind, is won with the first trick.

Only the winner of the first trick player may look at those cards. The knowledge of what cards to count out of the round, counterbalances the risk of taking points blindly.

Because there are 2 2♣ in the deck, and asking who has them could reveal information about the Kitty, play instead starts to the left of the dealer, and that player deals the following round.
