= Reversis =

Card game

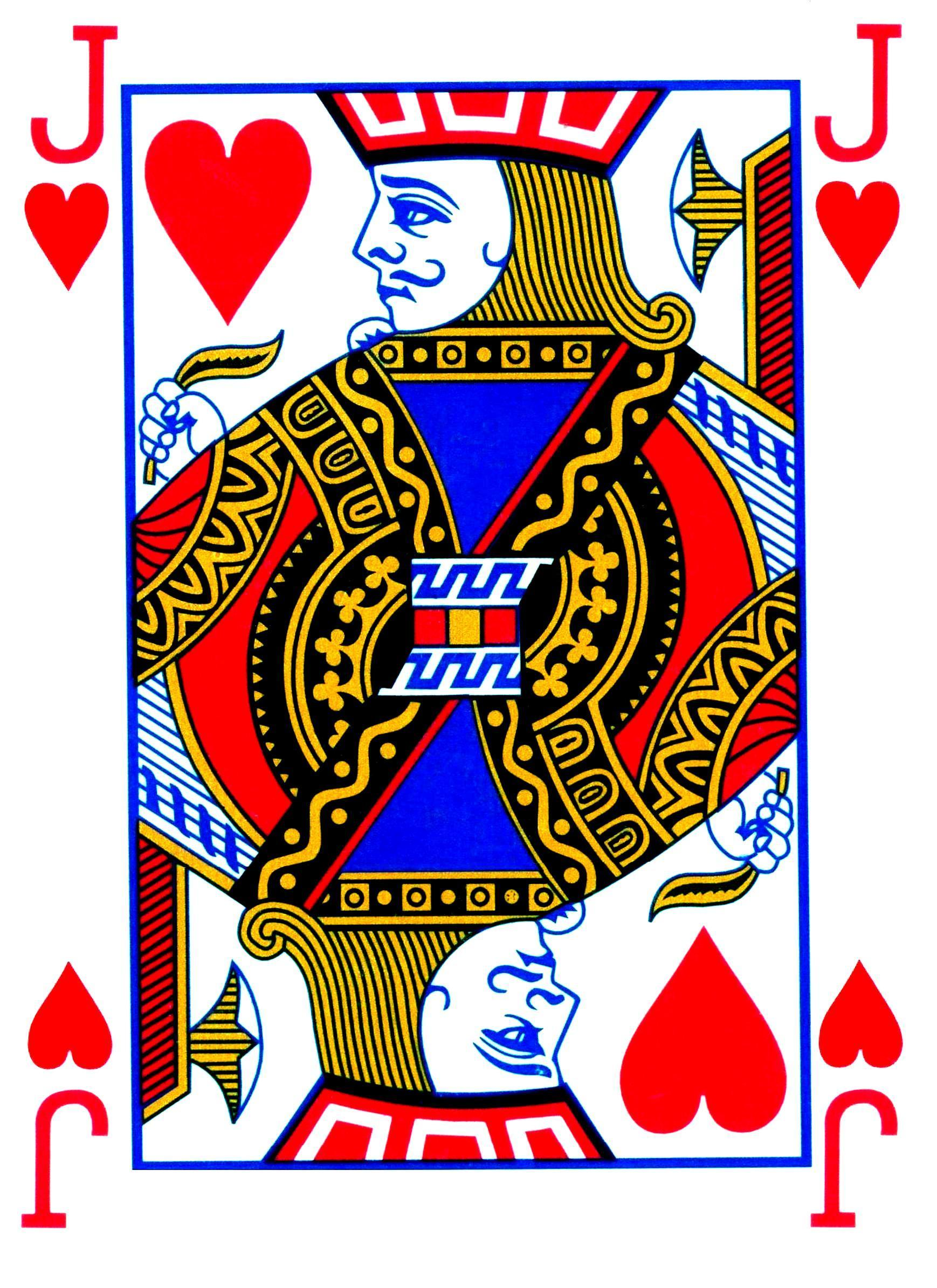
- The Quinola
- Origin: French or Italian
- Alternative names: Réversi, Réversis, Reversin, Reversy
- Family: Trick avoidance
- Players: 2–6
- Skills: Strategy
- Cards: 48
- Deck: French
- Play: Clockwise
- Playing time: 30 min.
- Chance: Difficult

Related games
- Polignac • Hearts

Reversis, or more rarely Réversi, is a very old trick-avoiding card game in the Hearts family. Its origin is uncertain, but it may have emerged in Italy before spreading to Spain and France. It is considered one of the two probable ancestors of Hearts, Black Lady and Black Maria, the other being Coquimbert or Coquinbert. It was very popular with the French aristocracy in the 17th and 18th centuries, and much played elsewhere, except in Britain. Initially quite simple, the game eventually developed more complex mechanics such as vast quantities of counters and a system of pools and side-payments. Its name may have possibly come from the reverse order and construction of the game itself, or even from its exceptional slam which, like "shooting the moon" in Black Lady, reverses the entire aim of the game.

== History ==
The game of Reversis was first mentioned in France in 1601, under the name Reversin, played with a 52-card pack and is the subject of a poem written around 1611 by Antoine du Brueil. Jean-Baptiste Bullet suggested it was invented in the Court of Francis I. In the earliest version of the rules there was no Quinola nor was there a pool or other embellishments that appeared later. The game was won and lost based on the points taken in tricks – the player with the fewest points being paid by every other player – but a player 'making the reversis i.e. a slam, won outright. It may have been this latter feature that distinguished it from Coquimbert or La Gana Perde with which it is sometimes equated in the literature. By 1634, it had given a special role to the ♥J, known as Quinola, and added the features such as trading Aces, a pool and points for successfully discarding key cards. Further important additions were made to this otherwise subtle game; in particular towards the end of the 18th century in the form of options. In the 19th century, the increasingly popular game of Reversis saw its rules becoming more and more complex with the exclusive use of preceding options making it a high-tension kind of game. It was long thought to be a game of Spanish origin, once a 48-card pack was used, besides its counter-clockwise rotation and the words Quinola, name of a 17th-century Spanish admiral, and Espagnolette, but it more probably originated in Italy where a negative variety of Tressette called Rovescino is still played.

In most games the highest cards were best in the usual method of play, but in Reversis the lowest had the preference. The Jack was a better card to play than the King, and one of them, the Jack of Hearts, was called the Quinola, just as at Primero. The strange incongruity of this inverted order of things made the Spaniards, when this game became known to them, give it the appropriate denomination of La Gana pierde, that is, the winner loses.

== Common rules ==
Reversis is a trick-avoidance game where each player normally attempts to avoid taking tricks, especially those with counting cards (A K Q J) in them. However, in the rare event of having a very strong hand, a player may attempt to 'make the reversis', i.e. take all tricks. The game is normally played by four players with a 52-card, French-suited pack, in later rules lacking the 10s, and ranking A K Q J (10) 9 8 7 6 5 4 3 2, Aces being high. There are no trumps. The traditional, higher, card values were: Ace 5 points, King 4, Queen 3 and Jack 2, remainder 0, making a total of 56 in the game. However, from the middle of 18th century, lower card values were introduced, being reduced to Ace 4, King 3, Queen 2 and Jack 1, giving a total of 40, while the ♥J or Quinola scored 4 if in the discard pile or partie.

Deal and play are anticlockwise beginning with first hand. Each player plays one card to each trick. Players must follow suit if able, otherwise may play any card, some rules placing restrictions on what may be discarded. The player with the highest card of the led suit takes the trick and leads to the next.

At the end of each deal, players add up their card points and the one with the fewest points wins and is paid the agreed amount by the one with the most points. However, if a player takes every trick, called 'making a reversis', this takes precedence and that player wins the deal.

== Ancient Reversis ==
Le Plaisant Jeu du Reversis des Dames or LPJR (1634), describes the "ancient game of Reversis" played by "our fathers" alongside the contemporary rules. This "languid and sleepy" game was only played by four players, never five. There was no trading of Aces and the ♥J was just an ordinary Jack. No pool was used and there was no talon in the sense of a fixed payment for winning and losing.

There was a tariff for each card point which could be as little as 1 denier or 1, 2, 3 or 10 sols. The one with the fewest card points was the winner and was paid by all three opponents; each one paying the number of points personally taken. Counters called jetons were used to keep score and players settled at the end.

== Reversis (early 17th century) ==
Much of LPJR is devoted to a newer variant which, compared to Ancient Reversis, is "full of action and fire". Additional features include bonuses and penalties associated with the Aces and the Quinola (♥J), a fixed payment for winning, called the talon, and the feature of trading Aces. There was a five-hand variation in which players received 10 cards and discarded one.

=== Preliminaries ===
A card is thrown on the table and further cards dealt individually to the players. The first to receive a card of the same suit as the table card deals first. The dealer shuffles and offers the pack to the left for cutting, before dealing 13 cards each, either individually or in packets (e.g. 3–3–3–4). Players view their hands and make a single discard, face down. (Note: Presumably Quinola and possibly other key cards could not be discarded, but this is nowhere stated.) Alternatively, 12 cards are dealt and 4 laid aside.

Trading. Before play begins, a player with an unguarded Ace may call for another Ace and trade it with the player who holds it. By agreement, the unguarded Quinola may also be traded for an Ace. Cards may not be re-traded. (Note: LPJR does not state a procedure for this e.g. whether players could only call for an Ace in turn beginning with first hand.)

=== Play ===
See common rules of play.

=== Winning ===
Normal game. In a normal game (i.e. not a successful reversis), players count up the points in their tricks and the player with the most points is talon. That player has lost and pays the talon to the winner. If two or more players tie with the most points, the one with the most tricks loses; if points and tricks are equal, the number of counting cards decides. The score was kept in jetons which were converted to hard score at the end, the usual tariffs (then in sols) being: Ace 1, Quinola 2, talon 3 and reversis 4. A common alternative scheme was 2–3–6–9.

Quinola. The owner of Quinola aims to discard it onto another suit in which he or she is void. There is normally no payment for this. An alternative rule is that its holder sweeps a pool (Poule) into which all players – or just the dealer – have paid an agreed amount at the start of each deal. If Quinola is forced out by a Heart lead, the player who led to the trick is paid 2 jetons by its holder. (Note: The scoring scheme implies that Aces were paid for in the same way, but at a rate of 1 jeton.)

Reversis. A player making the reversis wins and earns the agreed rate from each other player. All payments made by the reversis winner during the deal are repaid. If the reversis is lost on the last trick, the player who broke it wins the talon and not the one who scored the fewest points. Payments made during the deal by the person who broke the reversis are returned.

== Reversis (mid-17th–early 18th century) ==
By the mid-17th century, trading Aces has gone, but a pool is now standard and could now be won by a successful reversis as well as by a successful discarding of Quinola. The first lead had to be a heart if the player had one and players were not allowed to discard hearts when void in the led suit, with the exception of the K, Q and Quinola.

The rate for Quinola was now 4 jetons if forced out but still 1 for an Ace. If Quinola was successfully discarded on another suit, its holder swept the pool and was also paid 2 jetons by the trick taker. A reversis winner swept the pool and earned 2 jetons from each opponent, as well as having any payments during that deal returned.

In a normal game, the loser 'paid the talon' to the winner, which was an amount equal to the pool.

== Reversis (late 18th century) ==
By the late 18th century, Four Aces, the feature that was later to become known as the espagnolette, a bid to lose every trick, had been added along with an elaboration of the side payments and the lower card values. In the 1785 edition of Almanach des Jeux were the following changes or additions to the common rules:

=== Preliminaries ===
A 48-card pack, lacking 10s, is now standard. Each player has a box of, typically, 30 counters: 10 contrats and 20 fiches. (Note: A contrat may have been worth 10 fiches but the source is unclear.) They each put 4 fiches into a small basket, except the dealer who antes 8. Thereafter, if the basket becomes empty, it is replenished; otherwise the dealer alone added 4 fiches. The first dealer is chosen by dividing the pack into four roughly equal piles, one per player, and the player with the Quinola deals first. Cards are dealt in three rounds of 3, 4 and 4 cards each, except that the dealer always receives 4 cards. The remaining three are placed face down on the table to form the talon. In turn and beginning with first hand, players may now exchange with the talon, laying the discard under the basket before picking up the top talon card. If they choose not to exchange; they view the talon card before laying it away. The dealer, who has 12 cards to begin with, simply discards one. The four cards under the basket form the partie.

=== Play ===
As per the common rules with the following additions:

Aces. An Ace 'placed', i.e. discarded on another suit when unable to follow suit, earns its holder 1 fiche from the trick taker or 2 if it is the ♦A. If the Ace is forced, the holder pays double to the one who forced it out. Payments are doubled on the last trick. A player who leads an Ace to a trick pays 1 fiche to the eventual winner of the partie or 2 if it was the ♦A. But the winner must claim this before cards are cut for the next deal or it is forfeited.

Quinola. If the Quinola is successfully placed, its holder sweeps the contents of the basket and earns 4 fiches from the player who took the trick. If it is forced out, its holder pays a bête equal to the contents of the basket, as well as 8 fiches to the player who forced the Quinola; the latter also receives a consolation of 2 fiches from each of the other two players. If the Quinola is led to a trick, its holder pays the bête.

Reversis. A player is committed to making the reversis having taken the first 9 tricks. If successful it earns 16 fiches from each opponent, but all side payments during the deal are returned. The partie does not count. If the reversis is broken, 16 fiches are paid to the one who broke it. During the last two tricks, there are no side payments.

Quinola with Reversis. A successful reversis player may draw the contents of the basket for placing Quinola on any of the first 9 tricks or if it is forced on the first trick, in which case 8 fiches are earned from the one who forced it. A player who fails to make the reversis and has played Quinola in the first 9 tricks pays a bête in addition to the reversis.

Four Aces. This is an early form of what later became the espagnolette contract. A player with four Aces at the start of play may legally renounce at any time, but in doing so commits to losing every trick. Failure to do so means loss of the deal and paying the winner as normal or, if another player makes the reversis, paying on behalf of all three losers i.e. 48 fiches to the winner.

=== Winning ===
There are three ways of resolving a normal game. In each case the loser is the player with the most points in cards and the winner the one with the fewest. In the event of a tie for loser, the one with the most tricks loses; if points and tricks are equal, the one nearest the dealer's right loses. Similarly, if players tie for winner, the one with fewest tricks wins, if points and tricks are equal, the one nearest first hand's left wins. The Quinola is worth 2 card points in tricks, but 4 in the partie.

- Simple partie (Partie simple). The loser pays 4 fiches to the winner
- Partie under the basket (Partie sous le panier). The loser pays a fiche for every card point in the partie plus 4 additional fiches.
- Partie with the mat (Partie avec le tapis). Ditto but an additional 4 fiches are paid, called the 'mat' (tapis).

== Reversis (mid-19th century) ==
Reversis reached its greatest complexity in the mid-19th century by which time it had passed its peak in France. The following rules are based on an 1850 English source: The Hand-book of Games by Henry George Bohn.

=== Preliminaries ===
Each player starts with a box of counters containing 66 counters and 2 dishes called 'pools'. The counters comprise 36 fish (fiches), 24 jetons (Note: Confusingly Bohn calls the jetons 'counters'. They are all counters.) worth 6 fish each, and 6 contracts (contrats) worth 8 jetons each, with a total value of 468 fish. (Note: The ratio of counters in Reversis is unusual for French games of the time. A typical ratio, for example, in Mouche was that a fiche was worth 5 jetons and a contrat 20 jetons. Usually the jeton was the lowest unit.) The two pools are always placed at the dealer's right hand. The game requires a standard pack of cards with the Tens removed. Cards rank as normal and the lower card values are used.

The two pools receive the stakes (remises) as follows:

- The Great Quinola pool holds 26 fish and is refreshed whenever it is cleared or contains fewer than 26. This stake is attached to the ♥J or Great Quinola, which cannot be put to the discard pile, unless there are three stakes, or 100 fish in the pool.
- The Little Quinola pool, consists of 13 fish and is attached to the ♥Q, Little Quinola. It is replenished in the same manner. The Little Quinola cannot be put to the discard pile, unless there are 3 stakes, or 50 fish in the pool.

The dealer antes 2 fish into the Great Quinola pool, and 1 into the little; besides which every player, at the start, puts 6 into the former and 3 into the latter. Each time a pool is cleared, or when there are fewer fish in a pool than the original stake, it must be replenished as at the start. The great pool was always placed under the little one.

The deal proceeds as in the late 18th century rules, except that the talon cards are separated and placed opposite each non-dealer who puts a hand card under the pools, and replaces it with the card on the table. The dealer, likewise, discards one, but does not pick up. If three stakes are in the pools, then players may opt not to exchange, in which case they view the card before it is placed to the discard pile. Before play begins, each pair of opposite players exchange a card. The points in the discard, which form the 'party', the amount paid by the loser to the winner, score as in the tricks, except that ♦A is worth 5 points, and ♥J, Great Quinola, 4.

=== Play ===
Rules of play are as per the common rules above with the addition of the following:

Reversis. A player taking the first 9 commits to making the reversis and is obliged to win the remaining 2 or lose the game. The party does not count, nor the Quinolas unless the reversis player has played one or both before the last 2 tricks. If the reversis is broken, the player pays for the broken reversis and the stakes to the pools for any Quinola played before the reversis was undertaken. All side payments for Aces or Quinolas by the player undertaking the reversis are to be returned on winning it.

Espagnolette. An espagnolette is a bid to lose every trick and may only be undertaken by a player with four Aces, three Aces and a Quinola, or two Aces and two Quinolas. A player with such a combination is called the Espagnolette. The Espagnolette has the right to renounce in every suit and, if successful in making no tricks and there is no reversis, wins the party in preference to the player who is better positioned in the game. But if forced to win a trick, Espagnolette pays the party to the other and returns anything received for Aces or Quinolas. If a Quinola is held, Espagnolette must pay the stake to the pool instead of receiving it. During play, Espagnolette can exercise the renouncing privilege or play a normal game, but playing a renounce is a commitment to the contract. Espagnolette receives the stake in any part of the game, if another player forces the Quinola.

Reversis and espagnolette. It may be that one player is attempting a reversis, while another seeks to win an espagnolette. If so, whether the reversis is won or broken, Espagnolette pays singly for all the company. If Espagnolette can break the reversis, he or she is paid by the reversis player. If Espagnolette has placed Quinola, and there is a reversis, made or broken, the stake is not paid because, when a reversis is attempted, stakes are neither received nor paid, except by the reversis player. If, by another player having the Ace or King of Hearts, Espagnolette has, in any part of the game, either Quinola forced, he or she pays the stake and consolation to the one who forces, unless there is a reversis.

Bonuses.

- Each time a Quinola is placed, its holder is entitled to the stakes attached to them, except when there are three stakes in the pool, then Great Quinola earns 100 fish and Little Quinola 50. However, each time a Quinola is forced, the stakes are paid in the same proportion, except if the player makes the reversis, having played the Quinola before the last two tricks.
- The Great Quinola placed receives 6 fish and the Little Quinola 3, and if either of them is forced, the player who forces receives the same from each player: and these payments are made immediately.
- One or more Aces, or a Quinola led to a trick, incurs the same payment as if they had been forced, but to the player who eventually wins the party. The latter must remember to request payment before cards are cut for the next deal or forfeits the payment. If an Ace or Quinola is placed, forced or led during the last two tricks – called la bonne – payments are doubled to the player opposite.

=== Winning ===
In a normal game, players total the value of counting cards contained in the tricks they took and the loser pays the party to the winner. If two players tie, the one with the fewest tricks has preference. If points and tricks are equal, the one who dealt last wins, but a player with no tricks has preference over a trick without points.

- Espagnolette. If an espagnolette is played and won, the winner gains the party in preference to the last dealer.
- Reversis. When a player makes the reversis, there is no party.
- To the points in the discard, 4 are to be added for the party. The player who gives an Ace upon a renounce, receives 1 fish from the player who wins the trick, and if it happens to be the Ace of Diamonds, receives 2. The player who forces an Ace, receives the same payments from all the players.
- The payment for the reversis made or broken is 80 fish, each player paying 20, and the opposite party 40 when the reversis is made. If it is broken, the whole is paid by the player whose reversis is broken, that is, the reversis player pays the player breaking it the same number of fish that would have been received had it been won.

=== Game rules ===
Bohn lists extensive game rules mainly covering infractions of the rules, for example, stipulating that a player who misdeals, loses the chance to deal, or that a player who throws down his or her hand in anticipation of taking the remaining tricks, must pay for any Ace or Quinola held that can be placed or led.

== See also ==
- Polignac

== Bibliography ==
- _ (1634). Le Plaisant Jeu du Reversis des Dames. Paris: Claude Gourault.
- _ (1718). Académie Universelle des Jeux. Paris: Le Gras. pp. 96 ff.
- _ (1777). Rules for the Game of Reversis: For the Use of the Ladies and Gentlemen of the Reversis Society. Dublin: Hallhead.
- Bohn, Henry G. (1850). The Hand-Book of Games. London: Harrison.
- Bullet Jean-Baptiste (1762). Recherches Historiques Sur les Cartes à Jouer. Lyon: J. Deville. pp. 145 ff.
- de la Marinière, E. (1859). La Maison Académique. Paris: Estienne Loison. pp. 308 ff.
- Du Brueil, Antoine (1611). "Contre Le Reversis" in Les Muses Gaillardes, Recueillies des Plus Beaux Esprits de ce Temps. Paris: Brueil. pp. 128–132.
- Good, John Mason, Olinthus Gregory & Newton Bosworth (1813). Pantologia. Vol. X, Q-SOY. London: Kearsley.
- Lasserre, Lebrun and Leroy (1853). Nouveau Manuel Complet des Jeux de Calcul et de Hasard. Revised, corrected and augmented edn. Paris: Roret.
- Parlett, David (1996). A Dictionary of Card Games, Oxford: OUP. ISBN 0752518496
- Singer, Samuel Weller (1816). Researches into the History of Playing Cards. London: Bensley.
