= Pelmanism =

Pelmanism may refer to:

- Pelmanism (system), a system of brain training
- Concentration (card game), also known as Pelmanism
