= Gong Zhu =

Four-player trick-taking card game

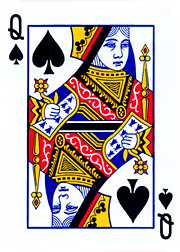
- Origin: Chinese
- Alternative names: Chinese Hearts
- Type: Trick-taking
- Players: 4
- Age range: All ages
- Cards: 52
- Deck: French
- Rank (high→low): A K Q J 10 9 8 7 6 5 4 3 2
- Play: Anticlockwise
- Playing time: 15 min
- Chance: Easy

Related games
- Black Lady

Gong Zhu (拱猪) is a Chinese four-player trick-taking card game that is similar to Black Lady, the leading member of the Hearts family. However, it differs in that it assigns quite different point values to cards. The objective of the game is to score positive points and avoid penalty points. Gong Zhu means: Push Out the Pig, for "pig" is the name given to the Q♠.

All players start with 0 points. The goal is to not be the first person to go past -1000 points (thus losing the game) and in some variations, also not more than 1000 points. The loser(s) becomes the pig, as Gong Zhu means "push out the pig" in Chinese. All points accumulate until any player(s) have lost, for which the game ends and all points will be reset to 0.

Unlike the Western game of Black Lady, there is no passing of cards prior to each round in Gong Zhu.

== Point values ==
- Point cards:
  - The J♦ (goat) is worth -100 points.
  - The Q♠ (pig) is worth +100 points.
  - The 10♣ (transformer) counts as zero points, but doubles a player's points at the end of a round and adds it to the accumulated points. If at the end of a round, a player has the 10♣ and no other point cards, it is worth +50 points (or +100 if exposed: see below).
  - The Hearts are worth +200 points in total:
    - Ace +50 points;
    - King +40 points;
    - Queen +30 points;
    - Jack +20 points;
    - 10 through 5 are worth +10 points each;
    - 4 through 2 are worth no points.
    - There is also another variant, where 10 to 5 and 3 to 2 are scored negative of their face value, and 4 is scored +10. The total remains +200.
- All other cards are worth 0 points and do not play a part in scoring.

=== Exposure of cards ===
A player may expose ("sell") the Q♠, J♦, 10♣ or A♥ before each round. An exposed card may not be played the first time its suit is led, including the lead itself, unless it is a singleton.

Exposing a card doubles its effect. For example, if the Q♠ is doubled, it will be worth -200 instead of -100. Exposing A♥ doubles all heart values, and the player capturing an exposed 10♣ scores quadruple for all other point cards collected.

For example, a player with exposed Q♠, 10♣ and A♥ gets 4×(100×2+50×2) = 1200 negative points. A player with all hearts except an exposed A♥ gets 2×150 = 300 negative points.

== Playing ==
In each trick, the suit is determined by the dealer who produces the first card. Players take turns to play a card in an counterclockwise direction and whoever produces the card of the largest value in the same suit collects all four cards and becomes the next dealer. In many variants, the holder of 2♣ starts the first trick, and any card can be played during the first trick other than exposed ones. In online games, it is also common that the player who got the Q♠ (pig) in the last round starts the first trick.

At the end of a round, all players' points are totaled up and added to their accumulated points for that game. Player(s) who have accumulated -1000 or lower points immediately lose that game (called "chulan"(出栏), meaning "being driven out of the pigsty (and ready for slaughter)"). After which, a new game begins and all points are reset to 0.

=== Scoring ===
Legend

- Point addition (Non-exposed cards)
- Point addition (Exposed cards)
- Point deduction (Non-exposed cards)
- Point deduction (Exposed cards)
- Not involved cards

Case	All Hearts	Value	Q♠ (Queen of Spades)	Value	J♦ (Jack of Diamonds)	Value	10♣ (10 of Clubs)	Value	Total Value
1	4,5,9,J,K	-160				+200		×2	+80
2	All	+200							+200
2	All	+400							+400
3	All	+200						×2	+400
3	All	+200						×4	+800
3	All	+400						×2	+800
3	All	+400						×4	+1600
4	All	+200		+100					+300
4	All	+200		+200					+400
4	All	+400		+100					+500
4	All	+400		+200					+600
5	All	+400		+200		+200		×4	+3200
6	5-A	-400		-200				×4	-2400

Points calculated are on an accumulative basis; usually, players will be given the points that are assigned to whatever point cards he collected after one round. There are multiple ways to shoot the moon, a player gaining points by doing so, rather than making other players lose points. In some cases, the J♦ and the Q♠ switch values, giving negative points to unsuspecting players.

1. In the general case (case 1) described in the table above, for example, a player has collected the cards 4♥, 5♥, 9♥, J♥ and K♥ (ace exposed), J♦ (exposed) and 10♣ (not exposed). Hence, he will get +80 (2*((-160)+(100*2))) points.
  A player who adds up the value of all of the hearts gets -200 points. Hence,
2. A player who gets all the hearts has shot the moon and are awarded +200 points, +400 points if the ace has been exposed.
3. A player who gets all the hearts AND the 10 of clubs can be awarded +400, +800 or +1600 points, depending on the cards that have been exposed.
4. A player who gets all the hearts AND the queen of spades makes it so the queen of spades counts as positive and he/she can be awarded between +300 and +600 points, depending on the cards that have been exposed.
5. The greatest win in Gong Zhu occurs when a player collects all hearts (ace exposed), 10♣ (exposed) and both the exposed J♦ and Q♠: +3200 points.
6. The greatest defeat in Gong Zhu occurs when a player collects all hearts between 5♥ and A♥ (ace exposed), Q♠ (exposed) and 10♣ (exposed): -2400 points.
7. In some variations, if a player gets the queen of diamonds, every trick won after the trick in which the queen of diamonds was won is worth 10 points.
8. In some variations, collecting all point cards grants the player an instant win, regardless of previous point standings and whether the cards are exposed or not.

== Terms & Jargon ==
- Cards
  - Pig's sty: meaning K♠ and A♠ for their ability to capture the pig.
  - Sheep's sty: meaning Q♦, K♦, and A♦ for their ability to capture the goat.
- Results
  - Small slam: collecting all cards of hearts (A♥-2♥). In this case, all hearts become positive in point calculations.
  - Grand slam: collecting all point cards. In this case, all hearts and Q♠ become positive in point calculations.
- Playing (many in this category was derived from bridge)
  - Lead: to be the first player in a new trick. The lead of the first trick is the dealer.
  - Last: to be the first player in a trick. Players usually try to be in this position to discard unwanted cards such as K♠, A♠, and large cards of hearts and played suits to avoid gaining negative points.
  - Shot down(击落): to deplete a player of a suit and capture the guarded honor (usually J♦) or small hearts (when trying to shoot the moon).
  - Self get(自得) or self eat(自吃): to capture a trick using J♦ or Q♠ and capture itself
  - Discard(垫): to play a card different from the color of the trick. This card is captured by the largest card of the correct trick. (This can only happen if a player have no cards of the correct trick)
  - Declare(摊牌): similar to its counterpart in bridge, it means to expose the remaining hand and explain the plan and result for playing. Other players may agree or disagree to this statement.
    - All-get(全大): Declaring that the player will continue to capture all remaining tricks and therefore all point cards remaining.

== See also ==
- Black Lady
- Black Maria
- Hearts
- Polignac
