= Black Bitch =

Black Bitch may refer to:

- Black Bitch, the working title of Australian TV series Total Control
- A person from the Scottish town of Linlithgow, deriving from the black dog on the coat of arms
- A slang name for the Queen of Spades in the card game Hearts
