= Black Lady =

American card game of the hearts group for three to six players

Black lady
- A trick-avoidance game
- The black lady
- Origin: United States
- Alternative names: American hearts, black lady hearts, black Maria, black widow, slippery Anne, rickety Kate
- Type: Trick-avoidance
- Players: 3–6 (4 best)
- Skills: Card counting, tactics
- Cards: 52 cards (4 players)
- Deck: French
- Rank (high→low): A K Q J 10 9 8 7 6 5 4 3 2
- Play: Clockwise
- Playing time: 10 minutes per hand
- Chance: Low–moderate

Related games
- Hearts • Black Maria
- Aim: avoid capturing hearts or the Q♠

Black lady is an American card game of the hearts group for three to six players and the most popular of the group. It emerged in the early 20th century as an elaboration of hearts and was initially also called discard hearts. It is named after its highest penalty card, the queen of spades or "black lady". It is a trick-avoidance game in which the aim is to avoid taking tricks containing hearts or the black lady. American author and leading bridge exponent Ely Culbertson describes it as "essentially hearts with the addition of the queen of spades as a minus card, counting thirteen" and goes on to say that "black lady and its elaborations have completely overshadowed the original hearts in popularity".

The game is often called hearts in America, although that is the proper name for the basic game in which only the cards of the heart suit incur penalty points. It is known by a variety of other names including American hearts, black lady hearts, black widow and slippery Anne. In Australia it is known as rickety Kate. It is sometimes misnamed black Maria which, however, is the British variant of hearts played with additional penalty cards.

== History ==
Black lady was developed in America in the early 20th century from hearts. It is first mentioned by R. F. Foster in 1909 who describes a variant called "Discard hearts which is sometimes called black jack or black lady". In black jack, the jack of spades was worth "ten hearts"; in black lady the queen of spades was worth "thirteen hearts". Discarding three cards was already part of the game as the name discard hearts suggests. The discards were passed to the left. Scoring was simple: one penalty point for every heart captured and thirteen for the queen of spades.

The slam known as "shooting the moon" first appeared in Britain in 1939 in a variant of hearts called hitting the moon. This was essentially black lady with the addition of a slam. Today this feature is a common element in the game.

Black lady was incorporated into Microsoft Windows under the name "Microsoft Hearts", starting with Windows 3.1.

== Aim ==
The aim of black lady is to avoid capturing heart cards or the queen of spades.

== Earliest rules – Foster (1909) ==
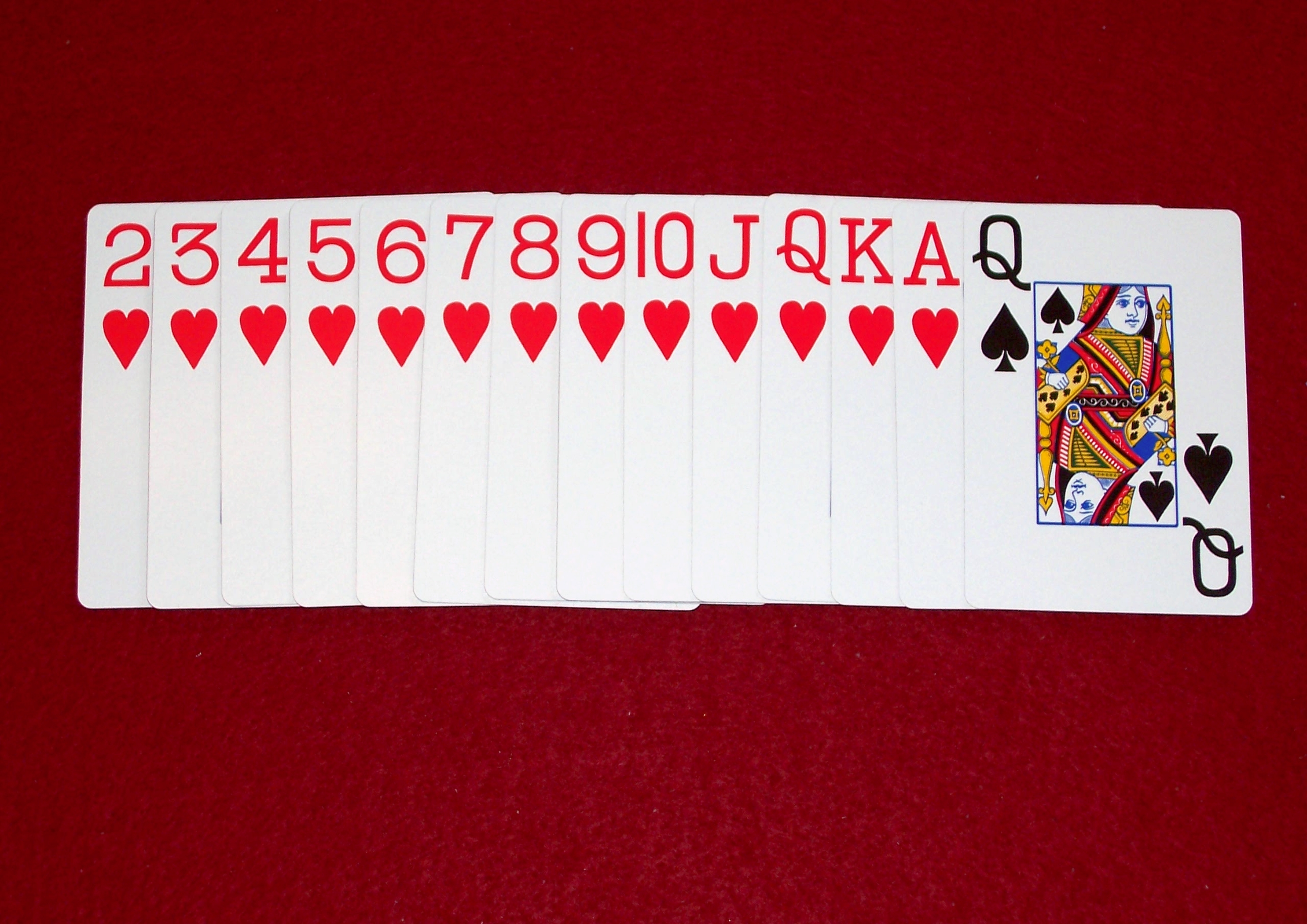
The penalty cards in black lady

The following rules are based on the earliest known rules – those by R.F. Foster (1909) – in which black lady was an alternative name for discard hearts, itself a variation of classic hearts.

=== Preliminaries ===
The game is designed for three to six players, although "four is the usual number." A standard 52-card deck of Anglo-American pattern cards is used in which cards rank in their normal order, aces high. If three play, the 2♠ is removed, if five play, the two black deuces are removed and, if six play, all four deuces are discarded. It was usual practice to play with two decks, one being shuffled while the other was being dealt. Players cut for the choice of seats (aces low), lowest becoming the first dealer and choosing a seat first and then others choosing their seats in their order. Players tying must cut again.

Any player has a right to shuffle, the dealer last. Dealer offers the cards to pone (to the right) for cutting, before dealing all the cards, clockwise and one at a time, to each player starting with eldest hand (to the left). The deal always rotates to the left. After the deal, each player discards three cards to the left-hand neighbour. Players may not view the cards they receive before selecting their discards.

=== Playing ===
The aim is to avoid taking any hearts or the black lady (Q♠) in the tricks. Eldest hand leads any card to the first trick. Players must follow suit if they can; otherwise may discard. There is no trump suit. The winner of a trick leads to the next.

=== Scoring ===
Foster's scoring scheme for basic hearts is that players start with a fixed number of counters (50 or 100) and pay one counter into the pool for each heart captured; the Black Lady being worth thirteen. The pool is claimed by the person or people winning it. There are two ways of deciding a winner. In the sweepstake method, the pool may only be claimed by a player or players who takes no hearts at all. If everyone takes at least one, the pool stays and forms a 'jack' (hence 'jackpot') until someone eventually takes no hearts at the end of a deal. If more than one player takes no hearts, they divide the pool, any odd counters staying put. In the 'Howell' method, at the end of each deal, players pay into the pool per opponent as many counters as they took hearts. So in a four-player game, if Andy takes the Black Lady and a heart i.e. 14 hearts, he pays 3 × 14 = 42 counters into the pool. Once everyone had paid up, players claim as many counters as they did not hold at the end (26 minus the number of penalty points scored). So Andy may claim 26 − 14 = 12 counters. This exhausts the pool and is designed to be a fairer reflection of the players' ability. The Black Lady ranks as a spade within the spade suit and so may be discarded if any other suit is played.

== Culbertson's rules (1950) ==
The following rules are based on those by American bridge expert, Ely Culbertson, where it is described as a separate game that is "essentially Hearts with the addition of the queen of spades as a minus card, counting thirteen". However, he omitted to mention that it also differed in retaining the discard or passing feature of Black Lady/Discard Hearts. The main change from the earliest rules is a much simplified scoring system. Culbertson includes a slam, first introduced by Phillips in 1939, but this time no points are scored for it. (Note: When the slam was introduced by Hubert Phillips in 1939, it incurred a penalty of 26 penalty points for everyone except the slam winner.)

=== Preliminaries ===
According to Culbertson, black lady may be played by three to seven players, individually, the best number being four. The standard 52-card deck is used and, in order to ensure each player gets the same number of cards, twos are discarded in the order: 2♣, 2♦, 2♠ and 2♥. Aces are high. Again, players may pass any three cards face down and to the left. As an alternative rule, however, players may pass cards alternately to the left and then right from deal to deal.

=== Playing ===
Eldest hand leads to the first trick with any card. Players must follow suit if they can; otherwise may discard any card. A trick is won by the highest card of the led suit and the winner of the trick leads to the next.

=== Scoring ===
When all the tricks are played, players total up their scores. Each heart card captured scores one penalty point and the black lady scores thirteen. If one player takes all the penalty cards, no scores are recorded for that deal. When the first player reaches 100 points, the game ends and the winner is the player with the lowest score.

== Modern rules – Morehead (2001) ==
Glenn and Denton (2003) state that this version "is nearly universal in the United States." These rules are based on Morehead (2001), except where stated. The major differences are the rules on passing and the scoring scheme for shooting the moon which reflects the earliest rule by Phillips.

=== Preliminaries ===
Three to six may play, but the game is best for four. There are no partnerships and no trumps. The standard deck is used and an even distribution of cards is achieved by removing as many of the following as are needed: 2♣, 2♦, 3♣ and 2♠. Cards rank in the normal order with Aces high. Alternative rule: any cards left over after the deal are put into a kitty and the winner of the first trick adds them to his or her tricks. Some rules allow the winner of the first trick to view the kitty as well. (Note: This is known elsewhere as Heartsette.)

Players cut for the deal, the player drawing the lowest card becoming the first dealer. Cards are dealt clockwise beginning with eldest hand. After the deal each player selects three cards to discard and passes them to the left-hand neighbour. This must be done before viewing the cards received from the right. Alternative rule: In the American version of this game, called American Hearts by Glenn and Denton, the cards are passed differently in successive deals. For the first deal, cards are passed to the left. For the second deal, cards are passed to the right. In the third deal, cards are passed across the table and in the fourth deal, players 'hold' i.e. do not pass any cards.

=== Playing ===
Card play follows the normal rules: eldest hand leads to the first trick. Players must follow suit if able; otherwise, they may play a card from any suit. The highest card of the led suit wins the trick, and the trick winner leads to the next. Alternative rules: The player holding the 2♣ leads with that card. Some rules state that neither hearts nor the Black Lady may be led until the first heart has been discarded. According to Morehead, in club play, the player with the Q♠ may be required to play it at the first opportunity by discarding or following a higher spade.

An innovation in modern black lady is the take-all or shooting the moon, whereby a player may aim to capture all the penalty cards; i.e., the black lady and all hearts. In this event the player scores zero, while each opponent scores twenty-six penalty points. In a failed attempt, penalty points are scored as normal. Morehead gives the old scoring rule that no players score for the deal and the other alternative that the player who successfully shoots the moon scores twenty-six plus points.

=== Scoring ===
Apart from shooting the moon, the usual scoring system is employed with players scoring one penalty point for each heart card taken and thirteen for taking the Black Lady. Game is 100 points. When the first player reaches this score, the game stops and players settle their scores.

== Variations ==
=== Passing cards ===
Unlike the basic game of hearts, card passing has always been a feature of black lady. It is also referred to as discarding, hence the earliest alternative name for black lady was discard hearts. The idea is that, before each hand begins, each player chooses three cards and passes them to another player. Cards are usually passed to the left, unlike the British game of Black Maria, where cards are passed to the right. Passing cards to the left is easier because you know something about the hand of the player who follows you whereas, in passing cards to the right, you have no information about the hand of the player to your left.

In the earliest rules, passing was always to the left. Today, there are many variations of passing:

- Four-way passing. The most common method, popularized by computer versions, rotates passing through four deals; on the first deal, players pass to the left, the second deal to the right, the third across the table. On the fourth deal no cards are passed; alternatively players may pass one card to each opponent ("scatter pass"). The cycle of four deals is then repeated.
- Left and right. The discarded cards are passed alternately left and right with each deal.
- Star passing. With an odd number of players, passing across is not possible. If five play, players choose two cards and pass one each to the two players opposite. The pattern of passing routes forms a five-point star.
- Shuffle passing. Players choose three cards and discard them to a central pile. The dealer then gathers, shuffles, and re-deals these cards.
- Two cards. When there are more than four players, only two cards can be passed.
- Dealer's choice. The dealer chooses the number of cards to be passed and the direction of passing.
- Rotating pass. Players pass in the following cycle: one player to the left, two players to the left, three players to the left, etc. This method accommodates any number of players. Additionally, if the cycle ends with a "no pass" round, one player (the one to the first dealer's right) will always pass to the dealer; this can assist in remembering where to pass cards.

Some versions prohibit passing some combination of 2♣, Q♠ or A♥.

=== Trick play ===
There are some common variants to this play:

- The player holding 2♣ must lead it to begin the first trick. In variations with 2♣ removed, play starts with 3♣.
- Hearts cannot be led until either they have been "broken" (discarded on the lead of another suit), or the player who must lead has nothing but Hearts remaining in hand. In some variations, any penalty card, including Q♠, can break Hearts.
  - In a sub-variation of the above, if a player's hand contains nothing but Hearts and other penalty cards, even if Hearts have not been broken, the player can lead a heart. Hearts are broken by this play.
- If jokers are used, rules must be defined concerning their play. Common conventions include:
  - Two distinct jokers are designated as the zero of clubs and the zero of diamonds, and behave just like ordinary clubs and diamonds.
  - Non-distinct jokers are valueless cards that cannot take tricks. They may be played at all times (except to lead tricks), or perhaps only when following suit is not possible.
  - Jokers may also be considered as penalty cards. They may behave as normal penalty cards, or they might only score if played to a hearts trick.
  - Jokers may be allowed to lead. If they are, the leading player calls a suit which must be followed, or the lead suit may be determined by the next card played.
- If the game uses multiple decks, and two identical cards tie for taking the trick, the most recently played card takes precedence. Cancellation Hearts (see the Variations section) defines different behavior involving identical cards.
- Booster nines. If a nine is played, the trick is extended by one round.

=== Shooting the moon ===
Shooting the moon is a very common scoring variation. If one player takes all the penalty cards on one deal, that player's score remains unchanged while 26 penalty points are added to the scores of each of the other players. This is known as playing by "old moon" rules. In the "new moon" rules, the player subtracts 26 points from their own score instead of adding 26 to the others.

There are several sub-variations to these rules:

- A player who shoots the moon may have a choice between old moon or new moon.
- A player who shoots the moon can choose new moon only if applying old moon for the hand would end the game with the shooter losing by points. For example, in a 100-point game, if the shooter has 90, a second player 95, and the leader 63, the shooter and the second player would lose the game since the second player would be on 121 points, the shooter on 90, and the leader on 89. Alternatively, the old moon stands, but the game continues (even though, in the example, the second player is on 121 points) for as long as there are no successful shoot the moon outcomes. At that point, the winner is the player with the lowest score, even if this is over 100.
- A player who shoots the moon may only use new moon after he or she, or perhaps another player, has reached a predetermined score.
- A player who takes all thirteen tricks may add 52 points to the other players' scores, subject to the other variations listed above. This is known as shooting the sun.
- A player who shoots the sun may add 52 points to the player who passed to him or her at the beginning of the round, while the others each receive 26. This is known as the "punishment rule".
- A player who takes all thirteen tricks reverts their score from the entire game to 0. This is known as "cleaning the slate".
- A player who takes all of the penalty cards but fails to shoot the sun scores normally instead of shooting the moon.
- The first trick of a hand does not count for shooting the sun; only the following twelve tricks are required. This allows a player who holds the two of clubs to shoot the sun, in the variant where the two of clubs is required to be the first lead.
- If a player receives 260 points (26 points every round) over ten rounds, all other players may receive 260 points and the player finishes with a score of 0, or all other players receive 100 in a normal game. This variant is called "shooting the big moon".
- A game cannot end immediately when a player shoots the moon or sun. Play continues for at least one more hand.

=== Scoring ===
A player who takes no tricks scores –5 penalty points.

A player that achieves a score of exactly 100 has their score reduced to zero. In this variant a score of 101 or greater is required to end the game.

== Variants ==
The main variants of black lady are cancellation hearts, omnibus hearts and pink lady.

=== Cancellation hearts ===
Cancellation hearts is first described in 1950 by Culbertson and is a variant designed for larger numbers of players, typically 6 to 11 players, using two decks shuffled together. If exactly the same card is played twice in one trick, the cards cancel each other out, and neither can take the trick. If two such pairs appear in the same trick, the whole trick is cancelled and the cards are rolled over to the winner of the next trick.

=== Omnibus hearts ===
In 1950, Culbertson reported that omnibus hearts was "rapidly becoming the most popular of hearts games" and was so called because it included all the features found in different members of the hearts family and Arnold states that it is "sufficiently different and popular" to justify being described as a separate game." In effect, omnibus hearts is really a variant of black lady to which has been added the bonus card of the 10♦ which earns 10 plus points for the player who takes it in a trick. If a player takes all fifteen counters (10♦, Q♠ and thirteen hearts), 26 plus points are scored for the deal and the rest score zero (noting that in Culbertson's black lady rules, what is now called shooting the moon results in no player scoring for that deal). Arnold (2011) states that omnibus hearts is considered the best version of hearts by many players. He refers to the capture of all counting cards as "hitting the moon, take-all or slam". The game ends when a player reaches or exceeds 100 penalty points, whereupon the player with the lowest score wins.

=== Pink lady ===
Pink lady is an "almost forgotten variant" that "doubles the fun of black lady", "adding interest and intensity." Its key feature is the addition of an extra high penalty card, the Q♥ or pink lady, which scores 13 penalty points like her counterpart, the Q♠. There are now 38 penalty points to be avoided per deal. The presence of the pink lady makes the A♥ and K♥ as dangerous as their spade counterparts and forms a counter to the black lady, enabling a player saddled with one 'lady' the opportunity to even the score by offloading the other. Spadaccini, like Gibson, recommends playing to 100 points.

=== Black jack ===
Black jack is recorded by Foster as early as 1909 and has appeared sporadically in the literature since. (Note: See, for example, Foster (1922), Wood and Goddard (1940), Culbertson (1950 and 1957) and Moss (1995).) The J♠ takes the place of the black lady but is worth 10 hearts or penalty points instead of thirteen. Moss (1995) calls it black jack hearts. In early rules, the black jack may be discarded if its holder is void in the suit led. In later rules, the black jack must be discarded before any other card if the player is void in the led suit.

=== Other variants ===
- Complex hearts. A variant by game designer Richard Garfield using the complex number system. Hearts are worth 1 each, Q♠ = 13i, J♦ = −10, and 10♣ multiplies the score for the given hand by 2i. The first player to reach an absolute value of 100 is the loser.
- Danger hearts. Ten rounds are played using standard scoring, and each player has three lives. If a player receives 15 or more points in a round, he or she loses a life.
- Royal hearts A game produced by Parker Brothers, but which may easily be played with an ordinary card pack. The Q♠ is worth 26 points instead of 13, Q♥ doubles the point value of all Hearts taken by that player, Q♦ is worth −10 points, and Q♣ negates the Q♠'s point value if both are captured by the same player.

=== Regional variants ===
- Gong Zhu ("Push Out the Pig") is a Chinese version. The aim is to take tricks containing bonus cards and avoid those with penalty cards. The counters are: 5♥ to 10♥ = −10, J♥ = −20, Q♥ = −30, K♥ = −40, A♥ = −50, Q♠ = −100, J♦ = +100 and 10♣, which doubles the score for the round.
- Likha or Leekha. Middle Eastern partnership variant. Play is anticlockwise and suit must be followed if possible. Q♠ and the 10♦ are the likha. If a player holds both (talyeekh) and cannot follow suit, one of them must be played. Q♠ is worth 13 penalty points, 10♦ 10 and every heart 1. Game is 101. The team of the first player to individually score 101 or more loses. If two or more players from opposing teams reach or exceed 101 in the same deal, the one with the higher score loses. Shooting the moon incurs a 37-point penalty.

== Strategy ==
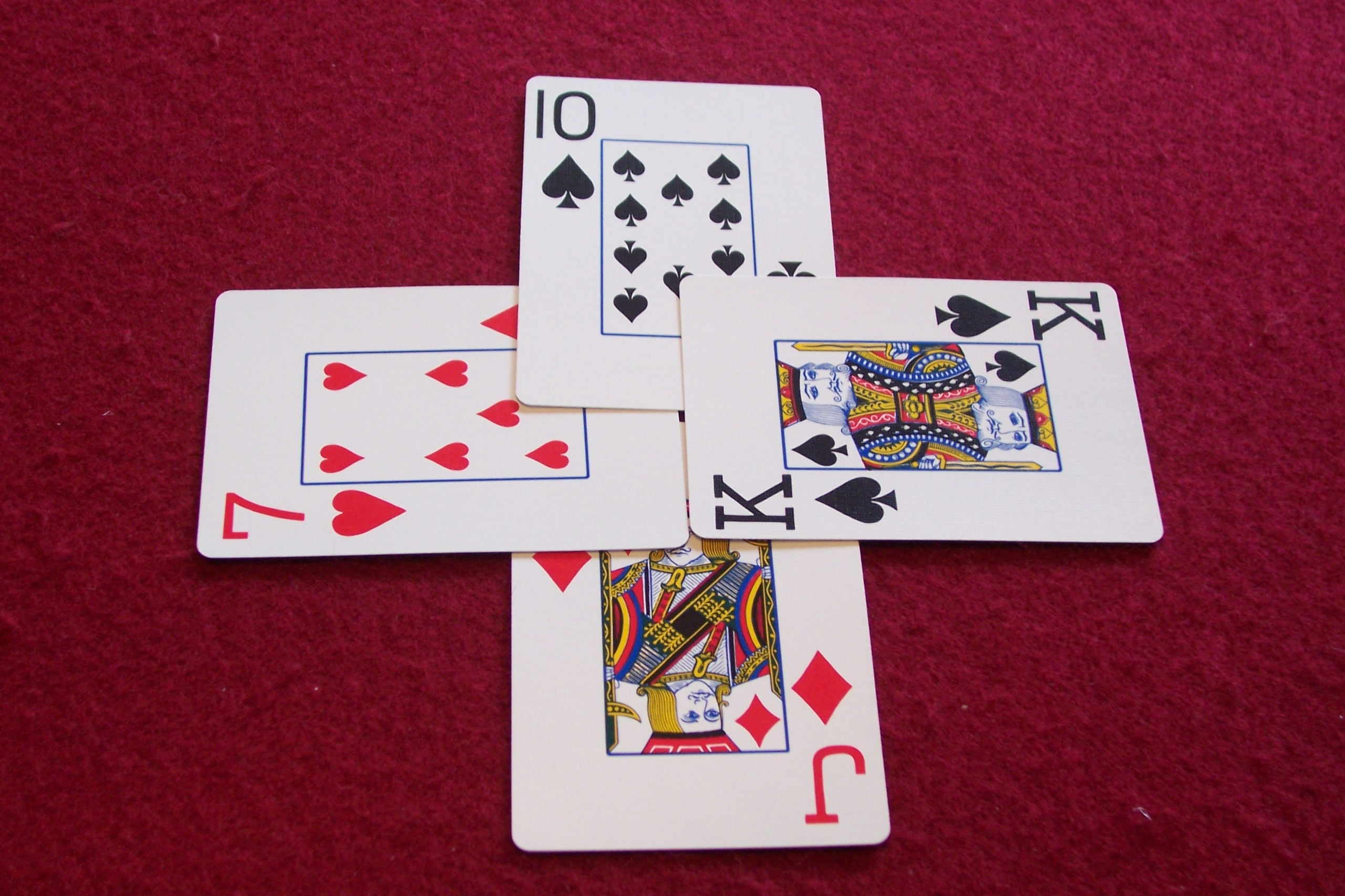
An example trick. South has led J♦ and takes this trick (which includes a 1-point penalty heart). In this case, no other player had any diamonds.

=== General ===
With the exception of trying to shoot the moon, players attempt to discard high cards, especially high hearts or spades, and try to avoid winning points. This can either be accomplished by creating a void or playing a high card last in a trick that has no points. Generally speaking, it is advantageous to play the highest card possible without winning the trick. Players particularly concentrate on getting rid of high cards in suits that they do not have padding low cards in. For example, if a player had ♠ A 5 4 3 2 the A♠ would not be much of an issue; they can play the four lower cards and hopefully exhaust another player's spades before being forced to play the A♠. In contrast, if they only had A♠, then they would be forced to play the A♠ the first time spades were led, with the risk that another player will respond with Q♠.

=== Passing ===
The main objectives of passing are to try to become "short" or "void" in a suit, and thus able to play off-suit when that suit is led; or to rid one's hand of "dangerous" cards that could force a player to take a trick containing penalty points, such as the ace, king, or queen of any suit (especially spades and hearts). A♠ and K♠ are two of the most important cards to get rid of, because they are not worth any points themselves but are ranked higher than Q♠ and as such would force players to take the queen if ♠ are lead. In addition, high hearts can leave the player defenseless once hearts are broken. When creating voids, it is best to do that in either clubs or diamonds, because players want to avoid receiving high hearts or spades without having any padding. For this reason, spades lower than the queen are typically not passed unless the player is attempting to shoot the moon. Care must be taken in passing too many high cards which could allow the player receiving the cards to shoot the moon. A simple passing strategy to keep a recipient from shooting the moon is to pass them a single low-value heart, this is especially effective when holding on to the A♥, because when a player has at least one heart it is impossible to shoot the moon without it. As such, it is often wise not to pass the A♥ at all.

=== Voids ===
A void is when a player does not have any cards of a certain suit. Generally, this is a highly advantageous situation, because it prevents the player from winning any points in that suit, and provides a means to dispose of poor cards. These can be intentionally created with good passing strategy, or appear by themselves.

=== Bleeding spades ===
If a player does not have A♠, K♠, or Q♠, it is to that player's advantage to lead spades to try to force Q♠ onto another player. This is also referred to as "smoking the lady/queen", in reference to the combat action of creating smoke in a closed area so that any enemy combatants hiding there would be forced to come out into the open (the Q♠ is forced to be played by its bearer, thus causing the Q♠'s points to be taken by that bearer, and thus evaded by the player actuating the smoking). A player who has A♠ or K♠ but not Q♠, and with a large number of other spades, may feel insulated from being forced to play A♠ or K♠ in any subsequent smoking play, and thus could also participate in smoking. Even the player that has the Q♠, provided he or she similarly has a lot of other spades may decide to "smoke himself" to empty all the other players of their spades, thus ironically insulating himself from being smoked in the future – or perhaps to get the game into the situation in which another player(s) has a "dry" (i.e., solitary) spade that is A♠ or K♠, in which case a trick could be started with Q♠ in the full knowledge that some other player has this dry A♠ or K♠ and will be forced to play it, taking the Q♠'s points.

=== Shooting the moon ===
Attempting to shoot the moon is often a risky strategy, as failure to capture every single penalty card will result in the remaining penalty points (as many as 25, if only one heart is missed) being added to one's score. Shooting the moon can rapidly change the direction of a game in a player's favour. A good hand for shooting the moon should contain significant high cards, in addition to a long run of a single suit that can be used to keep the lead once the other players have run out of that suit. Furthermore, it is necessary to either have no hearts, or most/all high hearts (A♥, K♥, Q♥, J♥), as shooting the moon requires a player to win every trick they lead with hearts. Even with K♥, Q♥ and J♥ a moon attempt will invariably fail, because savvy players will not discard the A♥ before multiple people have scored at least one point, so the A♥ will ensure them at least one trick containing points.

=== Teaming up ===
Because black lady is generally understood to have only one winner when the game ends, some of the general strategies change when one or more players are at risk of reaching 100 points. In such scenarios it becomes strategical for players to work together to ensure the Q♠ goes to the lowest score player, in order to close the gap before the game ends. Similarly, when a player is at 87 points or more and receives the Q♠, everyone but the lowest score player can assist that player in shooting the moon (as long as the new moon rule is in play) so that the game does not end immediately, giving everyone a chance to catch up.

== See also ==
- Hearts
- Polignac

== Literature ==
- Little Giant Encyclopedia. New York/London: Sterling. 2009.
- Arnold, Peter (1995). The Book of Card Games. Barnes & Noble. ISBN 1-56619-950-6.
- Arnold, Peter (2011). Chambers Card Games. London: Chambers Harrap. ISBN 978-0550-10179-2.
- Culbertson, Ely (1950). Culbertson's Hoyle. Greystone Press.
- Foster, Robert Frederick (1909). Foster's Complete Hoyle. New York: Frederick A. Stokes.
- Foster, Robert Frederick (1920). Foster's Complete Hoyle. New York: Frederick A. Stokes.
- Gibson, Walter Brown (1971). Hoyle's Simplified Guide to the Popular Card Games. Doubleday.
- Glenn, Jim; Denton, Carey (2003). The Treasury of Family Games. Reader's Digest Association. ISBN 978-07621-0431-4.
- Kansil, Joli Quentin, ed. (1999). Bicycle official rules of card games. Cincinnati, OH: United States Playing Card Company. ISBN 1-889752-06-1.
- Morehead, Philip D., ed. (2001). Hoyle's rules of games : descriptions of indoor games of skill and chance, with advice on skillful play : based on the foundations laid down by Edmond Hoyle, 1672-1769 (3rd rev. & updated ed.). New York: Plume. ISBN 0-451-20484-0.
- Moss, William A. (1995). 10-Minute Card Games. New York: Sterling.
- Parlett, David (1987). The Penguin Book of Card Games. London: Treasure Press. ISBN 1-85051-221-3.
- Phillips, Hubert; Westall, B.C. (1939). The Complete Book of Card Games. London: H.F. & G. Witherby.
- Sackson, Sid (1 June 1994). Card Games Around the World (reprint ed.). Courier Corporation. ISBN 978-0-486-28100-1.
- Seymour, Paul Henry (1958). Hoyle Standard Games. A. Whitman.
- Spadaccini, Stephanie (2005). The Big Book of Rules. Plume.
