= Concentration (card game) =

Memory-based card game

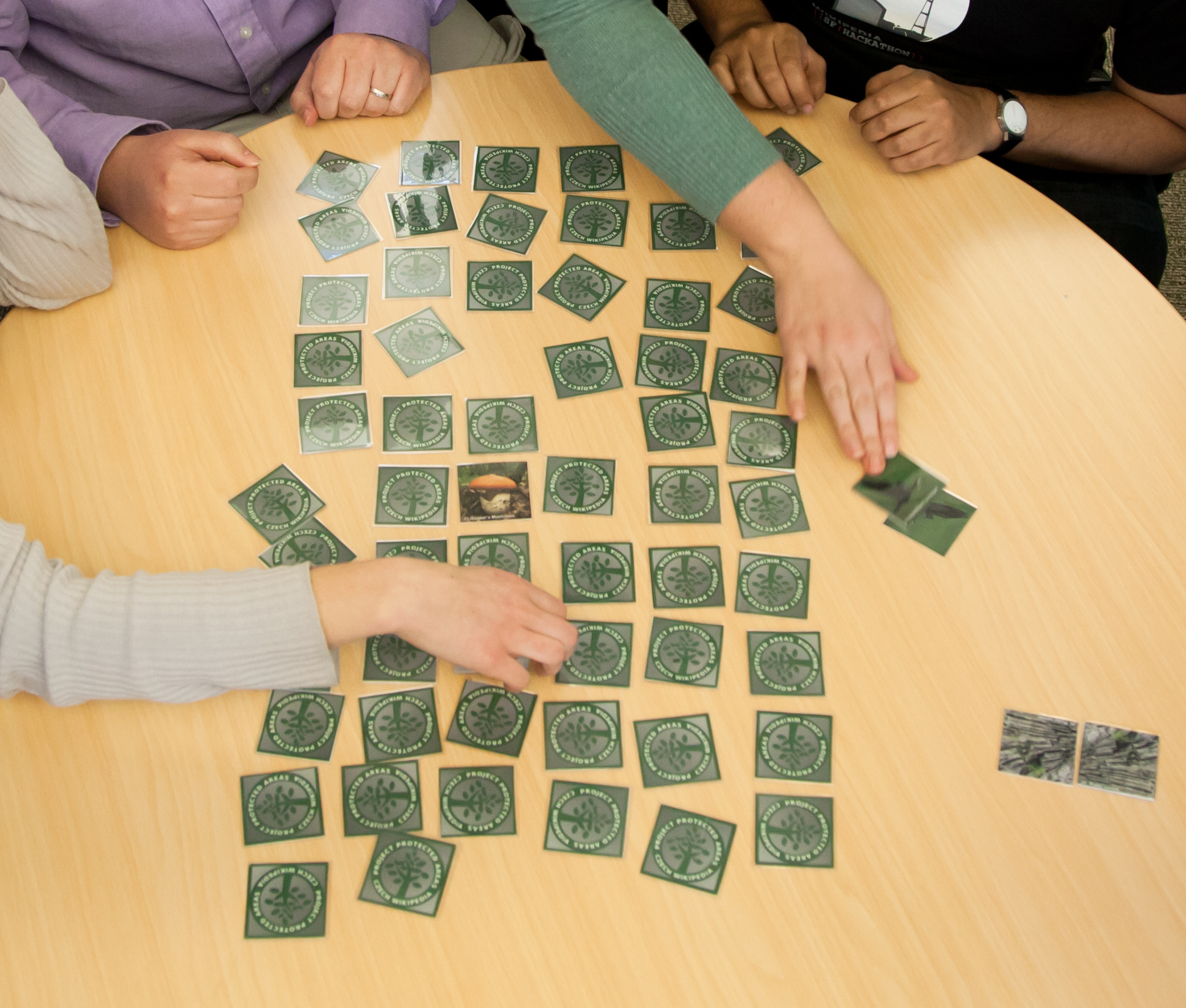
Matching cards are removed from the game when paired

Concentration is a round game in which a set of cards are all laid face down on a surface and two cards are flipped face up over each turn. The object of the game is to turn over pairs of matching cards.

Concentration can be played with any number of players or as a solitaire or patience game. It is a particularly good game for young children, though adults may find it challenging and stimulating as well. The scheme is often used in quiz shows (in fact, several game shows have used its name in their titles) and can be employed as an educational game.

== Names ==
Concentration is also known by a variety of other names including Memory, Matching Pairs, Match Match, Match Up, Pelmanism, Pexeso or simply Pairs.

== Rules ==
Any deck of playing cards may be used, although there are also commercial sets of cards with images. The rules given here are for a standard deck of 52 cards, which are normally laid face down in four rows of 13 cards each. The two jokers may be included for a total of six rows of nine cards each.

Additional packs can be used for added interest. Standard rules need not be followed: the cards can be spread out anywhere, such as all around a room.

In turn, each player chooses two cards and turns them face up. If they are of the same rank and color (e.g. six of hearts and six of diamonds, queen of clubs and queen of spades, or both jokers, if used) then that player wins the pair and plays again. If they are not of the same rank and color, they are turned face down again and play passes to the player on the left. Rules can be changed here too: it can be agreed before the game starts that matching pairs be any two cards of the same rank, a color-match being unnecessary, or that the match must be both rank and card suit.

The game ends when the last pair has been picked up. The winner is the person with the most pairs. There may be a tie for first place.

== Solitaire ==
Concentration may be played solo either as a leisurely exercise, or with the following scoring method: play as normal, but keep track of the number of non-matching pairs turned over (this may be done using poker chips, pennies or by making marks on a sheet of paper). The object is to clear the tableau in the fewest turns, or to get the lowest possible score.

With perfect memorization and using an optimal strategy, the expected number of moves needed for a game with $n$ cards converges to $(3-2\ln 2)n/2+7/8-2\ln 2\approx 0.8 n$, with $n \to \infty$. For a standard deck of 52 cards, the expected value is $\approx 41.6$ moves.

== Strategy ==
Over the course of the game, it becomes known where certain cards are located, and so, upon turning up one card, players with good memory will be able to remember where they have already seen its pair.

It is common for many players to think they know where pairs are, and turn over the one they are sure of first, then be stumped finding its mate. A better strategy is to turn over a less certain card first, so that if wrong, one knows not to bother turning a more certain card over.

An ideal strategy can be developed if one assumes the players have perfect memory. For the One Flip variation below, this strategy is fairly simple. Before any turn in the game, there are t cards still in play, and n cards still in play but of known value. The current player should flip over an unknown card. If this card matches one of the known cards, the match is next chosen. Less obviously, if the card does not match any known card, one of the n known cards should still be chosen to minimize the information provided to other players. The mathematics follow:

If a remaining unknown card is chosen randomly, there is a 1/(t−1−n) chance of getting a match, but also a n/(t−1−n) chance of providing opponents with the information needed to make a match.

There are some exceptions to this rule that apply on the fringe cases, where n = 0 or 1 or towards the end of the game.

Concentration (card game)

== Variations ==
Many of these may be played in combination with one another:

- Any Color: A version especially good for young children where matching pairs need only be of the same rank, not the same color. When playing with jokers, these count double because they are more difficult to match.
- One Flip: Players who make a successful pair win these cards but do not go again until their next turn.
- Zebra: Pairs may only be formed by cards of the same rank, but opposite in color (so 7 of diamonds would match with a 7 of clubs or spades, but not a 7 of hearts)
- Two Decks: For a much longer game, shuffle together two 52-card decks and lay them out in 8 rows of 13 cards (9 rows of 12 cards if using jokers). Pairs must be identical (same rank and same suit, so the 10 of clubs would have to match the other 10 of clubs).
- Two Decks Duel: Duel is a two-player game where the playing field is divided into two separate parts. Each player shuffles a full 52-card deck and lays it out in 4 rows of 13 cards. The players cannot access each other's cards. Player one starts, flipping one card face-up, then player two selects one card from his/her own side. If the pair is a match, cards are removed, if not, they are flipped back. Pairs must be identical (same rank and same suit, so the 10 of clubs would have to match the other 10 of clubs). After every turn roles are exchanged, in this case: player two flips a card and player one answers.
- Double Decker Checkerboard: For a slightly easier version of the two-pack game, use decks with different backs and shuffle them separately. Deal them out in a checkerboard pattern (red, blue, red, blue, etc.) The different backs help identify the position in the grid and significantly reduce the possibility of which cards will match.
- Fancy: The cards need not be laid out in a strict rectangular grid and many players have their own special layouts that include circular, triangular, or diamond-shaped formations. Dealers may select any layout they wish.
- Spaghetti: Same rules as standard concentration, only the cards are not laid out in neat rows. They are strewn randomly about on the floor.
- Pexeso: Played with a deck of 64 cards of square shape, which are laid out into an 8×8 square. Usually cards are designed specifically for the game of Pexeso, but at the same time there is no limitation on the content of the cards (images from a cartoon shows, photographs of a historic monuments or touristic destinations, car model of a specific automobile company, etc.). Cards are not divided into any kind of value or colour system; their content consists only of 32 pairs of identical cards.

If one of the players has a particularly good memory, she could play blindfolded. In this case, her opponent must say which cards have been turned up, turn the cards back down if she does not get a pair and take the cards out for her if she does get a pair.

Concentration is not limited to playing cards. Many versions of the game that are designed for children may have different themes. In some computer versions, the cards may randomly move to increase the difficulty.

== See also ==
- Concentration (game show)
- Solitaire
- Klondike (solitaire)
