= Jean-Baptiste Bullet =

French writer

Jean-Baptiste Bullet (1699 in Besançon – 6 September 1775) was a French writer on philology and antiquities, and the author of Histoire de l'Établissement du Christianisme, a treatise of the existence of God demonstrated by nature in response to the problems evoked by unbelievers against various parts of the holy books. But he is best known for his memoirs of the Celtic language, his historical research on playing cards and his Dissertation on various topics in the history of France. It is in this last work that he argues that the word "fleur de lys" has no similarity with the royal insignia bearing the flower of the same name, but the word "lis" which in Celtic language would have meant "sovereign king."

== Biography ==
He was correspondent of the Royal Academy of Inscriptions and Letters, royal professor of divinity, member of the academies of Lyon and Dijon, and dean of the University of Besançon, where he died in 1775. Besides some theological productions, he wrote: Histoire de l’Établissement du Christianisme, taken solely from Jewish writers, Recherches Historiques sur les Cartes à Jouer and Dissertations sur différents sujets de l'histoire de France. But the reputation of Bullet is principally founded on his Mémoires sur la Langue Celtique, Besançon, 1754–1760, a work which displays much more industry and learning than either taste or judgment.

== Works ==
- De apostolica e ecclesiae Gallicanae origine (Besançon, 1752)
- Mémoire sur la langue celtique, contenant l'histoire de cette langue et un dictionnaire des termes qui la composent (Besançon, 1754)
- Recherches historiques sur les cartes à jouer (Lyon, 1757)
- Dissertations sur différents sujets de l'histoire de France (Besançon, 1759)
- Histoire de l'établissement du christianisme, tirée des seuls auteurs juifs et païens, où l'on trouve une preuve solide de la vérité de cette religion (Lyon, 1764)
- L’Existence de Dieu démontrée par les merveilles de la nature (Paris, 1768)
- Dissertations sur la mythologie française et sur plusieurs curieux de l’historie de France (Paris, 1771)
- Réponses critiques aux difficultés proposées par les incrédules sur divers endroits des livres saints (Paris, 1773–1775)
