= Pelmanism (system) =

Cognitive training regimen

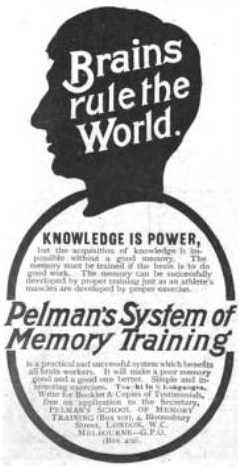

Pelmanism, a system of brain training, was popular in the United Kingdom during the first half of the twentieth century.

== History ==
Originally devised as a memory system in the 1890s by William Joseph Ennever, the system was taught via correspondence from the Pelman Institute in London (named after Christopher Louis Pelman). With this were associated six overseas institutes: in Melbourne, Durban, Johannesburg, Delhi, Calcutta and New Rochelle, New York. It was advertised as a system of scientific mental training which strengthened and developed one's mind just as physical training strengthened your body. It was developed to expand "Mental Powers in every direction" and "remove those tendencies to indolence and inefficiency".

The system promised to cure a range of problems such as "grasshopper mind", forgetfulness, depression, phobia, procrastination and "Lack of System". One of the techniques taught as late as the 1950s in Britain was the method of loci, recorded since ancient Roman rhetoric, to remember 20 or 100 items in order, keyed to a particular house or geographic route familiar to the student.

Pelmanism was practised and promoted by former British prime minister H. H. Asquith, Sir Robert Baden-Powell (founder of the Boy Scout movement), novelist Sir Henry Rider Haggard, playwright Jerome K. Jerome, Major General Sir Frederick Maurice and composer Dame Ethel Smyth as well as thousands of other Britons.

In the context of modern psychology, Pelmanism may have only limited academic interest. It remains of interest as a self-help tool, but is seen by some as quirky and eccentric.

== See also ==
- Robert Frederick Foster
- Monkey mind
- Pelmanism (card game)
