= Hearts (card game) =

Card game

- An evasion-type trick-taking game for 3 to 6 players
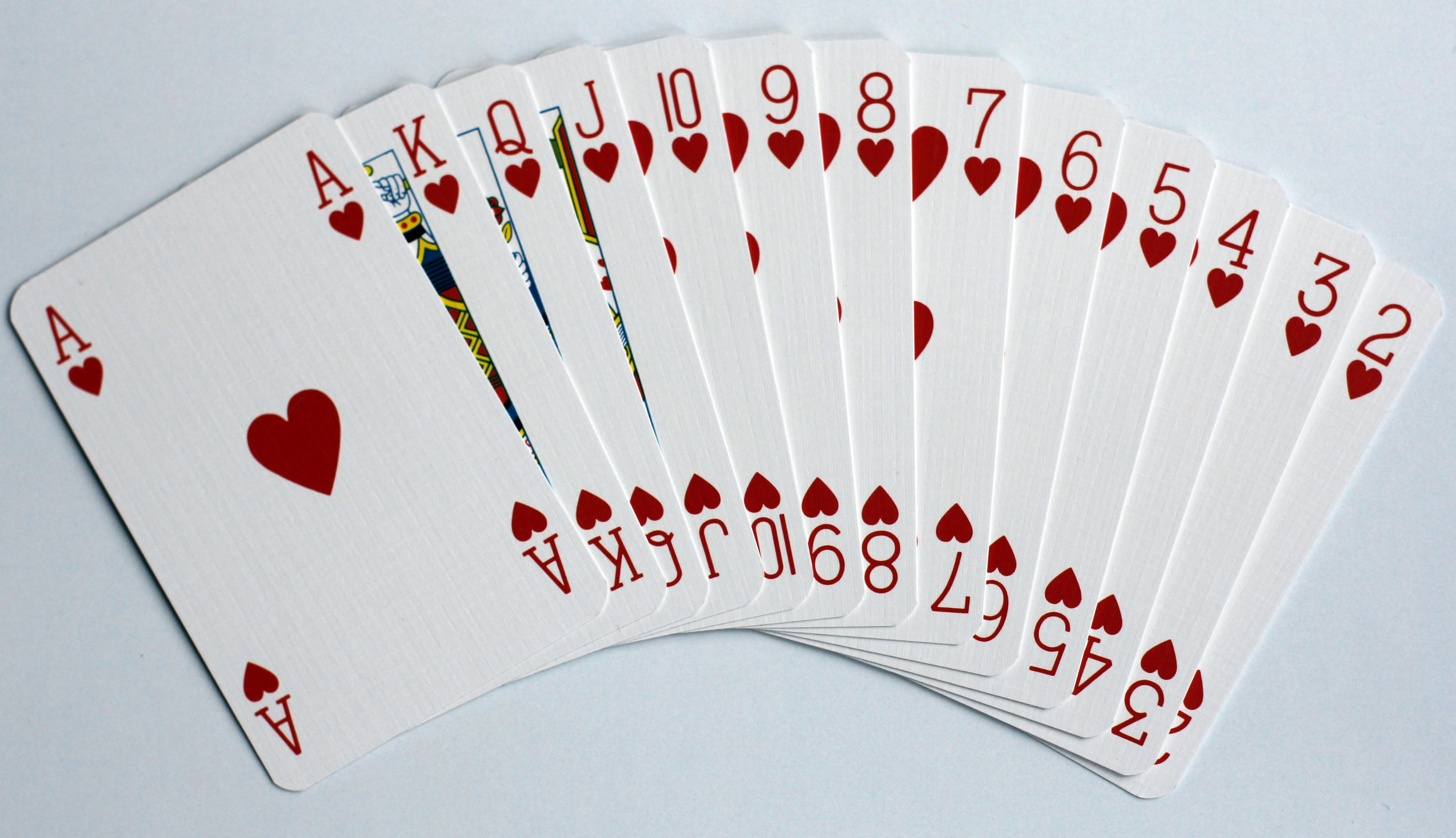
- All the cards of the Hearts suit
- Origin: United States
- Type: Trick-taking
- Players: 3–6, (4 is best)
- Skills: Card counting, Tactics, Teamwork
- Cards: 52-card (51 or 54 for 3 or 6 players, 50 for 5)
- Deck: French
- Rank (high→low): A K Q J 10 9 8 7 6 5 4 3 2, no trump
- Play: Clockwise
- Playing time: 5 minutes per hand
- Chance: Low – moderate

Related games
- Black Lady • Black Maria • Cancellation Hearts
- Notes: Hearts, while not trump, award one penalty point each, hence the game's name. Aim: avoid capturing hearts

Hearts is an "evasion-type" trick-taking playing card game for four players, although most variations can accommodate between three and six players. It was first recorded in the United States in the 1880s and has many variants, some of which are also referred to as "Hearts", especially the games of Black Lady and Black Maria. The game is a member of the Whist group of trick-taking games (which also includes Bridge and Spades), but is unusual among Whist variants in that it is a trick-avoidance game; players avoid winning certain penalty cards in tricks, usually by avoiding winning tricks altogether. The original game of Hearts is still current, but it has been overtaken in popularity by Black Lady in the United States and Black Maria in Great Britain, respectively.

== History ==
The game of Hearts probably originated with Reversis, which became popular around 1750 in Spain. In this game, a penalty point was awarded for each trick won, plus additional points for taking J♥ or Q♥ in tricks. A similar game called "Four Jacks" centred around avoiding any trick containing a Jack, which were worth one penalty point, and J♠ worth two.

Hearts itself emerged in the United States during the 1880s, The Standard Hoyle of 1887 reporting that it had only been played there for "the last five years" and was "probably of German origin". (Note: This could still refer to Reversis, which had been popular in Germany since the mid-18th century.) It described Hearts as "a most pleasant game, highly provocative of laughter". It was a no-trump, trick-taking game for four players using a full pack of cards, the aim being to avoid taking any hearts in tricks. The basic format has changed little since. Two scoring variants were mentioned under the name 'Double or Eagle Game'. The first was the precursor to Spot Hearts whereby the cards of the heart suit cost the following in chips: Ace 14, King 13, Queen 12, Jack 11 and pip cards their face value. The second scoring scheme was: Ace 5, King 4, Queen 3, Jack 2 and all pips 1 chip each.

In 1909, the Q♠ was added as the highest penalty card in a variant called either Discard Hearts, after the new feature of passing unwanted cards to other players following the deal, or Black Lady, after the nickname for the Q♠. This new variant has since become the standard game of the Hearts group in the United States where it is often, somewhat confusingly, also called "Hearts". To begin with, Black Lady did not have the option of "shooting the moon"; that came later.

In the 1920s, the J♦ variation (ten positive points) was introduced. Sometime later, the scoring was reversed so that penalty points were expressed as positive instead of negative.

The slam is known as "shooting the moon" and first appeared in Britain in 1939 in a variant of Hearts called Hitting the Moon. Today this feature is a common element of modern Black Lady.

Meanwhile, in Britain, the game of Black Maria, with its additional penalty cards in the suit of spades, emerged in 1939. Both it and another offshoot, Omnibus Hearts, are "sufficiently different and popular to justify descriptions as separate games."

The game has increased in popularity through Internet gaming sites which, however, usually offer the Black Lady variant while still calling it Hearts, whereas most books maintain the distinction between the two games. Microsoft Windows included Hearts (in fact Black Lady) in its operating system from Windows 3.1 to Windows 7, making it one of the earliest digital renditions.

== Earliest rules (1887) ==
The following rules are based on those published in The Standard Hoyle of 1887.

=== Preliminaries ===
The game is usually played by four players, but three to six can be accommodated (see below). The aim is to avoid taking any cards of the heart suit in tricks. A standard 52-card pack of English pattern cards is used, cards ranking from ace (high) down to the two. Players draw a fixed number of chips, typically 25 or 50, which may or may not have a monetary value. The deck is shuffled by the dealer, cut by the player to the right, and then dealt clockwise beginning with eldest hand, the player left of the dealer, until each player has thirteen cards. There are no trumps. If cards are misdealt, the deal passes to the left. If cards are faced in the pack, the dealer reshuffles, offers it for the cut and re-deals.

=== Playing ===
Eldest hand leads to the first trick. Players must follow suit if able; otherwise may discard any card. The trick is won by the highest card of the led suit and the trick winner leads to the next trick. If a player revokes, they lose the trick and pay the pre-agreed penalty in chips.

=== Scoring ===
A player taking all 13 hearts pays (or gets paid by if Shoot the Moon rule is used) 13 chips: four to each opponent and one to (or from if Shoot the Moon rule is used) the table. Otherwise, the player with the lowest number of hearts wins and the others pay that player in chips the number of hearts they took. So if A has one heart, B two, C four and D six, A will receive 2 chips from B, 4 from C and six from D making 12 in total. If two or more players have the lowest number of hearts, they divide the spoils and any remainder stays on the table for the next round. So if A and B have two hearts, C has three and D has six, C pays 3 chips, D pays 6 and A and B claim 4 each, leaving the remaining chip on the table. A player who revokes in order to avoid taking 13 chips, pays 8 to each opponent.

==== Variants ====
There are two scoring variants known as the Double Game of Hearts (or Eagle Game of Hearts):

1. The hearts score the following in chips: ace 14, king 13, queen 12, jack 11 and pip cards their face value (e.g. the nine is worth 9 chips)
2. The hearts score the following in chips: ace 5, king 4, queen 3, jack 2 and pip cards their face value.
3. If a player captures all 13 Hearts, they get paid 13 chips (Shoot the Moon).

== Modern rules (2011) ==
The following rules are based on Arnold (2011).

=== Preliminaries ===
Three to six may play, but four is best. A standard pack is used. For three players, the 2♣ is removed; for five players the 2♣ and 2♦ are removed, for six players the 3♣, 2♣, 2♦ and 2♠ are left out. Players draw cards to determine the first dealer; lowest deals. Deal and play are clockwise. Dealer shuffles and youngest hand (right of dealer) cuts. The dealer then deals all the cards, individually and face down, beginning with the eldest hand (to the left of the dealer).

==== Passing ====
A common variant is that players will select three cards from their hand and pass them to another player in a predetermined cycle that changes each hand, receiving three replacement cards from another player. This allows players to attempt to improve their hand, such as by discarding high-ranking cards likely to win a penalty trick, and also provides some information-sharing since the player passing knows three of the cards the player they passed to now holds.

=== Playing ===
Eldest hand leads to the first trick. Players must follow suit if able; otherwise, they may play any card. The trick is won by the highest card of the suit led, and the winning player captures the cards played in the trick. The winner also leads the following trick.

==== Minor rule variants ====
- Instead of the eldest hand leading, the player holding the 2♣ leads it to the first trick.
- A heart may not be played to lead a trick until another Heart has been played off-suit (known as "breaking Hearts"), or the leading player has a hand of only point cards.
- A penalty card may not be played to the first trick. If a player's hand has only penalty cards (rare), a misdeal may be called, or any of several possibilities for the penalty card on the first trick can be implemented, such as not counting that point, or laying it aside and giving it to the player who has the least nonzero points for the hand.
- For three players, two Jokers can also be added; how these cards behave when played can vary, most commonly they can never win any trick.

=== Scoring ===
Each heart captured in tricks incurs a penalty point, there being thirteen penalty points in total. The winner is the player with the lowest score either after an agreed number of deals, such as 8, or when one player reaches an agreed ending score, such as 100 points.

If Hearts is played for stakes, the average score is worked out and those above it pay the difference into a pool, while those below it draw the difference.

==== Shooting the moon ====
With this rule variant (also known as "running") in effect, a player who captures every penalty card in the hand may either deduct this maximum score from their total, or add it to every other player's score.

== Variants ==
=== Auction Hearts ===
The variant of Auction Hearts appears for the first time in the 1897 edition of Foster's Complete Hoyle. It is a game for four players, although five or six may "form a table". Its novel feature is that, after the deal, players may bid in sequence to declare the penalty suit. The eldest hand begins the bidding by stating the number of chips they're willing to pay for the privilege of naming the suit. The succeeding players may pass or bid higher. The dealer goes last and there is only one round of bidding. The player who wins the auction pays the winning bid into the pool and leads to the first trick.

=== Black Jack ===
Black Jack appeared at the same time as Black Lady, both as alternative names for the more general name of Discard Hearts. Discard Hearts, as the name suggests, introduced the concept of discarding (also called passing or exchanging) for the first time into Hearts. It is identical to the basic Black Lady game, but with the J♠ as the penalty card, worth 10 "hearts" (i.e. points). It is last mentioned by Gibson in 1974, only this time with the same penalty as Black Lady of 13 points.

=== Black Lady ===
Black Lady appeared in 1909, at which time it was also called Discard Hearts, and has since become the most popular variant in the United States, overtaking Hearts itself to become a game in its own right. It is frequently, and confusingly, also called Hearts, not least in computer gaming versions. However, its distinguishing feature is that the Q♠, the Black Lady, is an additional penalty card worth 13 points. The first description of the game already included the feature of discarding cards to one's neighbour after the deal. Over time, the game has developed elaborations such as 'shooting the moon' and passing cards in different directions with each deal.

=== Black Maria ===
Black Maria is the British variant of Hearts and features three additional penalty cards – the A♠ worth 10 points, the K♠ worth 7 points and the Black Maria or Q♠ worth 13 points. It was first described by Hubert Phillips in the mid-20th century. It usually includes passing to the right (not left as in other variants) which is considered more challenging because you don't know any of the next player's cards. Hitting the moon is an optional rule. Confusingly, sometimes the name Black Lady is given to this game and sometimes Black Lady is called Black Maria. (Note: Sources giving the name Black Lady as an alternative for Black Maria include The Card Game Set (2003) and its successor The Card Game Bible (2014). Sources giving the name Black Maria to Black Lady include Bathe (1998) and Katz (2012).)

=== Cancellation Hearts ===
Cancellation Hearts was first described in 1950 by Culbertson and is a variant designed for larger numbers of players, typically 6 to 11 players, using two packs shuffled together. If exactly the same card is played twice in one trick, the cards cancel each other out and neither can win the trick. If two such pairs appear in the same trick, the whole trick is cancelled and the cards are rolled over to the winner of the next trick.

=== Chasse Coeur ===
A French variant from the second half of the 19th century which originated in both France and Belgium. The aim is to avoid taking all four Queens as well as all hearts. Three to six may play, but the game is best for four. Queens are worth 13 penalty points each, the hearts (except the Q♥) 1 penalty point each. A player may declare a Générale and seek to win all the penalty cards; if successful, the opponents score 64 penalty points each; if unsuccessful, the declarer scores 64. A silent (unannounced) Générale incurs 54 penalty points for each opponent.

=== Domino Hearts ===
Another variant first noted by Foster in 1909, the key feature is that it is played with a stock. Each player receives six cards and the remainder are placed face down on the table as stock. A player unable to follow suit has to draw cards, one at a time, from the stock until they can follow suit. The last player holding cards must pick up any remaining cards in the stock and count them with their tricks. Every heart taken scores one penalty point. As soon as any player reaches or exceeds thirty-one points, the game is over and the winner is the player with the fewest hearts scored.

=== Greek Hearts ===
Greek Hearts is a name given to at least three different variants. In the earliest version, which Phillips and Westall (1939) say is widely played in Greece hence why they call it "Greek Hearts", the Q♠ scores 50 penalty points, the A♥ scores 15, the courts score 10 and the remaining pip cards of the Hearts suit score their face value. A player taking all the penalty cards scores 150, that is, gets paid 150 points by each opponent. There is "a great deal more in the game than there is in 'Slippery Anne'" (Black Lady). Meanwhile, Culbertson (1950) describes it as the game of Black Lady with three changes: three cards are always passed to the right, the J♦ counts as 10 plus points and a heart card may not be led to the first trick of the game. Maguire's version (1990) is essentially Spot Hearts with passing to the left and Parlett (2008) has a similar scoring system to the original, with the Q♠ valued at 50 penalty points, the A♥ at 15, courts 10 each, but the remaining hearts as only 1 each.

=== Heartsette ===
Heartsette is another very early variant that is still played. Its distinguishing feature is a widow. When four play, the 2♠ is removed, twelve cards are dealt to each player and the remaining three cards are placed face down in the centre of the table to form the widow. For other numbers of players, the full pack is used, the widow comprising three cards when three play, two when five play and four when six play. The player winning the first trick takes the widow and any hearts it contains. That player may look at these cards, but may not show them to anyone. Otherwise, the game is played as normal. The key difference from basic Hearts is that the first winner is the only one who knows how many and which hearts are still to be played.

=== Joker Hearts ===
Joker Hearts is recorded as early as 1897. One or more Jokers are added, which can be played at any time (regardless if following suit is possible). They cannot win tricks or score any penalty points.

=== Omnibus Hearts ===
In 1950, Culbertson reported that Omnibus Hearts was "rapidly becoming the most popular of Hearts games" and was so called because it included all the features found in different members of the Hearts family and Arnold states that it is "sufficiently different and popular" to justify being described as a separate game." In effect, Omnibus Hearts is really a variant of Black Lady where the bonus card of 10♦ is included which earns 10 plus points for the player who takes it in a trick. A similar sub-variant often called the "Jack of Diamonds rule" gives this effect to the J♦ instead. A player who takes all fifteen counters (10♦, Q♠ and thirteen hearts), scores 26 plus points for the deal and the rest score zero (noting that in Culbertson's Black Lady rules, what is now called shooting the moon results in no player scoring for that deal). Arnold (2011) states that Omnibus Hearts is considered the best version of Hearts by many players. He refers to the capture of all counting cards as "hitting the moon, take-all or slam". The game ends when a player reaches or exceeds 100 penalty points, whereupon the player with the lowest score wins.

=== Partnership Hearts ===
A recent variant that allows people to play in partnership. There are three versions of Partnership Hearts. In the first, partners sit opposite one another and combine their scores, a team that successfully shoots the moon causing the other to earn 52 penalty points. In the second, partners also face each other at the table, but keep individual scores. A player shooting the moon must do this alone. When a player reaches 100 or more, the partners combine their scores and the team with the lower score wins. The third is really a variant of Omnibus Hearts with a slam bid. After the deal, players bid to shoot the moon by taking all tricks. The player holding the 10♦ becomes the silent partner of the winning bidder and they combine their scores. If no one bids, the game is played as in Omnibus Hearts with no partnerships.

=== Spot Hearts ===
Spot Hearts appeared as a variant in the first description of Hearts in 1887, albeit referred to as the Double Game of Hearts or the Eagle Game of Hearts, being first named Spot Hearts by Foster in 1897. Both names continued to be used until the 1920s when Spot Hearts became the standard name of the game. The key difference is that the hearts are now worth values ranging from 2 to 14, rather than being worth 1 chip (or penalty point) each. The actual values are: A♥ at 14, K♥ at 13, Q♥ at 12, J♥ at 11 and pips score their face value. Foster remarks that "this adds nothing to the interest or skill of the game; but rather tends to create confusion and delay, owing to the numerous disputes as to the correctness of the count." Nevertheless, the game has been regularly listed right up to the present day with the Little Giant Encyclopedia (2009) giving an alternative name of Chip Hearts. Modern rules however, tend to score the A♥ as 1 penalty point rather than the original 14. (Note: See, for example, Little Giant Encyclopedia (2009) and Glenn and Denton (2003).)

=== Royal Hearts ===
Royal Hearts was a commercial variant of the game produced in the early 2000s by Parker Brothers, now owned by Hasbro. The variant encompasses special card effects from other variants like Omnibus, assigned to the four Queens. The Q♠ is worth 26 penalty points, double its typical point value in Black Lady, while the Q♥ doubles the point value of all Heart cards captured by that player (including the Q♥ itself), thus allowing for 52 potential penalty points per hand. Mitigating these, the Q♦ reduces a player's total score by 10 (but not below zero), similar to Omnibus's use of the 10♦ or J♦, while the Q♣ negates the penalty of the Q♠ if captured by the same player during the same hand. Shooting the moon is possible, and allows either subtracting the hand score (including the effects of other Queens) from the total score, or adding that score to all other players' totals.

== Strategy ==
Losing tricks

As an "evasion" trick game, taking a trick is rarely advantageous; it may be harmless (no penalty points), but the winning player must then lead the next trick, and all other players will very likely try to lose that trick as well. It is generally good strategy to try to lose every trick, however tricks in the early game are relatively "safe" as players are more likely to have to follow suit. A common lead play is a low-value card to deliberately lose the lead for the next trick. Undershooting, or following suit with a card just slightly lower in rank to the current high card, is a common strategy for those playing later to a trick; this allows a player, for instance, to safely play a Queen that may otherwise win a trick underneath the King or Ace of the suit. The very lowest cards in each suit (2-4) are very valuable as they basically guarantee the player will not win a trick in that suit in the early or middle stages; however, they can still win a trick (and penalty points) late in the hand if other players have managed to rid themselves of that suit.

Leading Hearts early

Although it appears wise to play low hearts first, it is usually better to hold onto them until it is clearer, from the fall of the cards, to whom you are giving them. Low hearts are especially handy for passing the lead over in the dangerous final few tricks. The exception to this is when one's plain suit cards are high or dangerous, but hearts are relatively low. In this case, it may be better to ditch the hearts earlier on.

Being Void or Long

To have a void is to have no cards of one suit, also known as "being void in" that suit. This is usually a highly advantageous situation; because the player cannot follow suit, they cannot win any trick in which that suit is led, and can also use that opportunity to play risky cards off-suit, such as high face cards or penalty Hearts (known as "sloughing"). Because every card in the deck is dealt to someone, at least one other player will be "long" in that same suit (having relatively more cards in that suit). Being long in a suit, especially Hearts, can have its own advantages, however one potential disadvantage is that the player may find themselves unable to "lose the lead" at the end of the hand after all other cards of the long suit have been played, and be forced to take several penalty-filled tricks.

Ace of Hearts

The A♥, while dangerous, is very important in variants where shooting the moon is an option. A common strategy for shooting the moon is to be long in Hearts and to play them in descending order, forcing other players to follow suit and thus giving all their Hearts to the player attempting the moon shot. The holder of the A♥ is the only player who can prevent this, either by taking a Heart trick themselves or (with some skill and luck) sloughing the Ace off-suit to a different player than the one attempting the moon shot.

Queen of Spades

Many variants like Black Lady/Black Maria give special importance to the Q♠, specifically to avoiding capturing it. In these games, it is common in the early game for one or more players to "smoke her out" by leading low Spades in several successive tricks, forcing whomever has the Queen to follow suit with it, very likely taking that trick and 13 points. Being long in Spades, especially J♠ and lower, is the natural counter to this, allowing a player to outlast this attempt by "undershooting" the current high Spade (or at least not allowing the player holding the Queen to undershoot them). Players with few Spades may attempt to void them, and if successful they can naturally avoid winning Spade tricks, however in passing variants this is very risky as players will usually pass the Ace and King, and with no other Spades in hand it is difficult to avoid taking the Queen.

== See also ==
- Gong Zhu, a Chinese version of Hearts

== Bibliography ==
- Little Giant Encyclopedia, New York, London: Sterling, 2009, ISBN 978-1-4027-6417-2
- The Standard Hoyle, New York: Excelsior, 1887
- Arnold, Peter (1995), The Book of Card Games, Barnes & Noble, ISBN 1-56619-950-6
- Arnold, Peter (2011), Chambers Card Games, London: Chambers Harrap, ISBN 978-0550-10179-2
- Culbertson, Ely (1950), Culbertson's Hoyle, Greystone Press
- Foster, Robert Frederick (1897), Foster's Complete Hoyle (3rd ed.), New York and London: Frederick.A. Stokes
- Foster, Robert Frederick (1909), Foster's Complete Hoyle, New York: Frederick A. Stokes
- Gerver, Frans (1966). Tous les Jeux de Cartes. Verviers: Gérard.
- Gibson, Walter Brown (1974), Hoyle's Modern Encyclopedia of Card Games, Dolphin
- Maguire, Jack (1990), Hopscotch, Hangman, Hot Potato & Ha Ha Ha, New York, London, Toronto, Sydney: Simon & Schuster, ISBN 0-671-76332-6
- Morehead, Albert H; Mott-Smith, Geoffrey; Morehead, Philip D., eds. (2001), Hoyle's Rules of Games, New York: Plume, ISBN 978-1-101-10023-3
- Parlett, David (2008), The Penguin Book of Card Games, London: Penguin, ISBN 978-0-141-03787-5
- Phillips, Hubert; Westall, B.C. (1939), The Complete Book of Card Games, London: Witherby
