= Polignac (card game) =

18th century French trick-taking card game

- A trick-taking avoidance game
- The Polignac
- Origin: French
- Alternative names: Four Jacks
- Family: Trick-taking
- Players: 3–6
- Cards: 32
- Deck: French
- Play: Clockwise
- Playing time: 20 minutes
- Chance: Easy

Related games
- Hearts
- Aim: avoid capturing Jacks, especially the J♠ (Polignac)

Polignac (a.k.a. Jeux des Valets) is a French 18th century trick-taking card game ancestral to Hearts and Black Maria. It is played by 3-6 players with a 32-card deck. It is sometimes played as a party game with the 52-card pack; however, it is better as a serious game for four, playing all against all. Other names for this game include Quatre Valets and Stay Away. Knaves is a variant and it is also similar to the Austrian and German games Slobberhannes, Eichelobern and Grasobern.

== History ==
Polignac is named after an ultra-royalist French politician, Count Jules de Polignac, who incensed the local population in 1830 and was imprisoned following the July Revolution. The game, however, is far older.

== Game ==
=== Aim ===
The aim of the game is to avoid capturing any Jacks in tricks, especially the J♠, called Polignac.

=== Cards and play ===
Polignac is played with a Piquet pack of 32 cards. However, unless four play, remove the black Sevens. The rank of the cards are: K Q J A T 9 8 7 in each suit.

=== Playing ===
The turn to deal and play passes always to the left. The cards should be divided evenly among the players, with the dealer dealing the cards in 2s and 3s.

Eldest leads first and the other players follow suit if possible, otherwise they may play any card. The trick is won by the highest card of the suit led, and the winner of each trick leads to the next. There are no trumps.

== Score ==
The players lose 2 points for capturing the Polignac, the J♠, and 1 for each other Jack captured. The first player to reach an agreed total of penalties, which may be 10 or 20 points, then loses the game.

Any player may bid capot before the opening lead is made. This is an undertaking to win every trick. If succeeded, each opponent loses 5 points; if not the bidder loses 5.

Eventually, the position of the Ace, common to old French card games, may be changed. If players prefer to make Ace high, penalties should attach to Queens instead of the Jacks. The players may decide to try to take all the tricks in a hand. This is known as general and the player must announce his intention before he leads to the first trick. If he succeeds, all the other players score 5 penalty points. If he fails, the Jacks score 5 penalty points in the usual way against the players who take them.

== Related games ==
The following are variants or similar games played in other countries.

=== Bassadewitz ===
Bassadewitz, also called Passadewitz, Bassarowitz or Passarowitz, is a 4-player game first recorded in the early nineteenth century and still played as a family game in parts of German-speaking Europe. It is a member of the trick avoidance group of playing cards.

=== Eichelobern ===
Eichelobern is an Austrian game played with a 32-card William Tell pack that is the German-suited equivalent of Slobberhannes (see below). The aim is to avoid taking the first and last tricks and the Eichelober - the Ober of Acorns.

=== Grasobern ===
Grasobern is the Bavarian equivalent of Eichelobern, played with a 32-card Schafkopf pack. The aim is to avoid taking the first and last tricks and the Grasober - the Ober of Leaves.

=== Knaves ===
Knaves is played with 3 or more players. Points are won for taking tricks and lost for taking Jacks. Players are dealt 17 cards from a French pack and the last card is turned for trump. Players must follow suit if possible; if not, they may play any card. Score 1 point per trick and deduct 1 for J♠, 2 for J♣, 3 for J♦ and 4 for J♥. Game is 20 points.

=== Slobberhannes ===
Slobberhannes is a simple German variation similar to Polignac which may have preceded it. The name means "Slippery Jack", though it probably refers to the infamous thief, Johannes Bückler, also known as Schinderhannes, and not to the card; which is in fact a Queen.

== See also ==
- Hearts (card game)
