= Robert Frederick Foster =

American memory training promoter and author

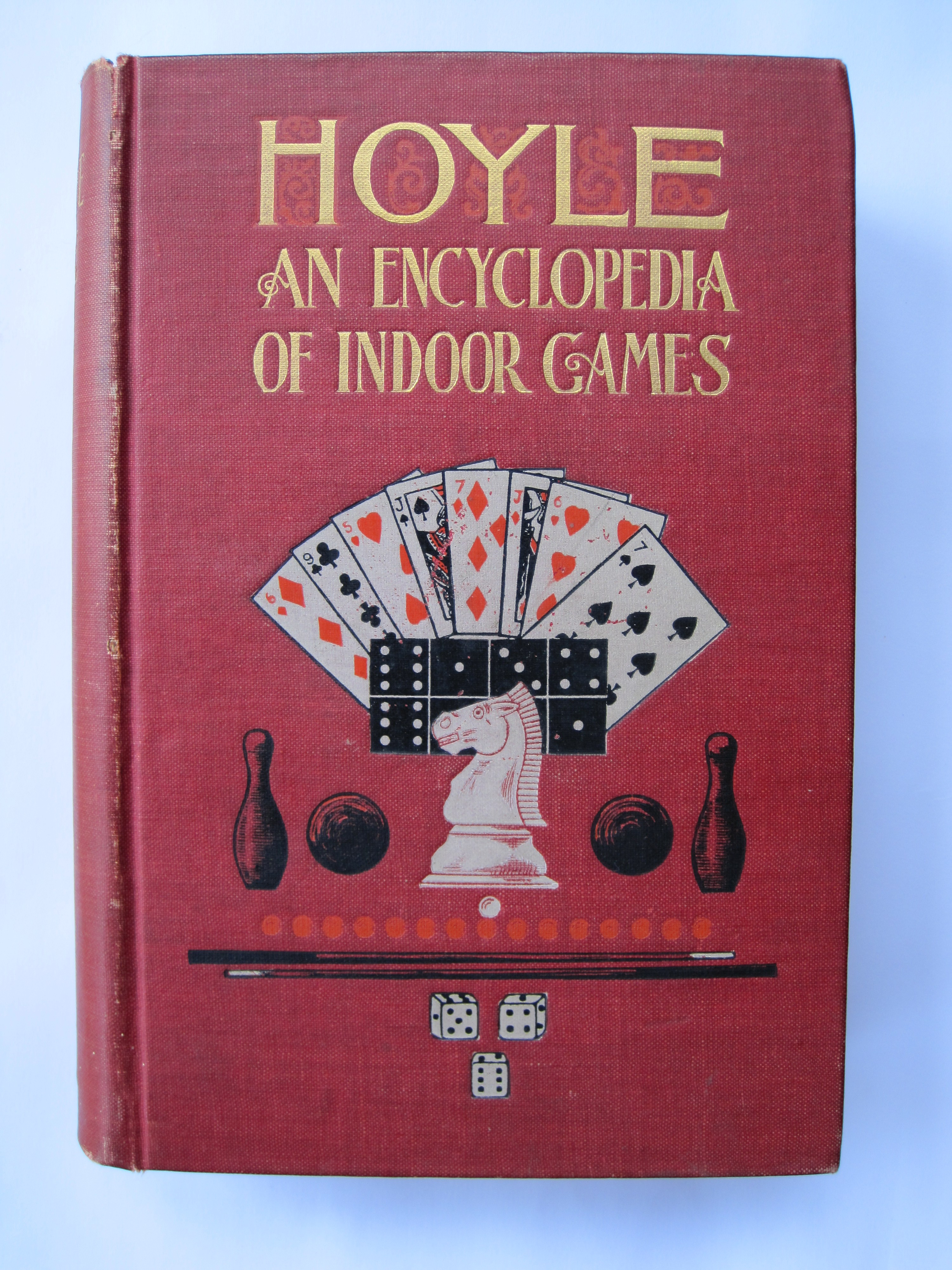
Cover

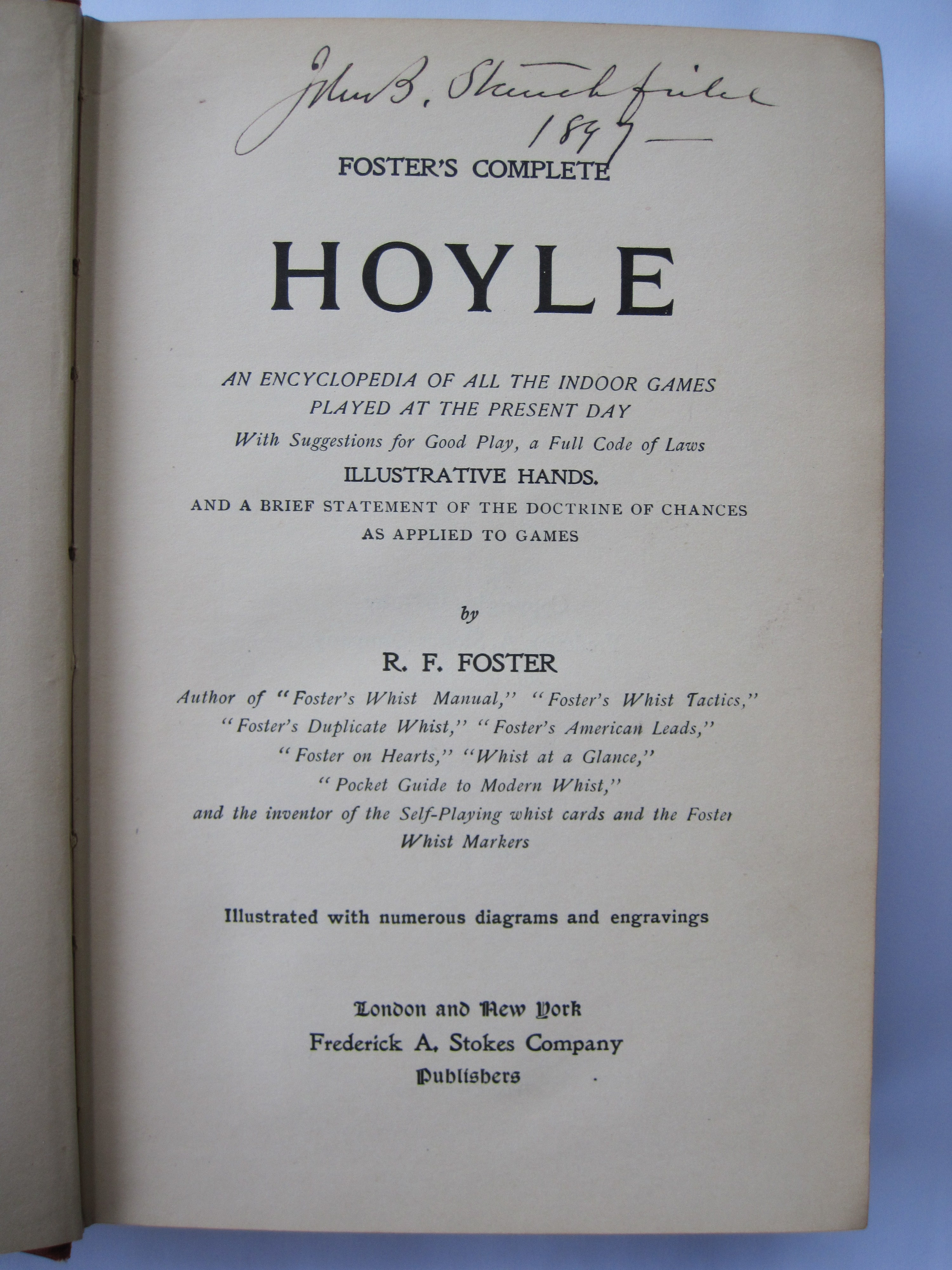
Title Page (with original owner's dated signature)

Foster's Complete Hoyle, published by Frederick A. Stokes Company, London and New York, 1897 (first edition)

Robert Frederick Foster (May 31, 1853 – December 25, 1945) of New York City, known as R. F. Foster, was a memory training promoter and the prolific writer of more than 50 nonfiction books. He wrote primarily on the rules of play and methods for successful play of card, dice, and board games. Alan Truscott wrote 20 years after his death that Foster "had been one of the great figures in whist and bridge" for 60 years.

== Biography ==
R. F. Foster was born in Edinburgh, Scotland on May 31, 1853, the son of Alexander Frederick and Mary E. Macbrair, and "connected with some of the best families in Great Britain". He was educated as an architect and civil engineer. He emigrated to the United States (probably in 1872) (Note: According to his short New York Times obituary, "Foster came to this country immediately after the Chicago fire of 1872." But the Great Chicago Fire was in October 1871.) where he engaged in surveying and gold prospecting and then in manufacturing before turning to the memory training and writing businesses in 1893.

Foster married Mary E. Johnson in 1891 and became card editor for the New York Sun in 1895. He filled that position to 1919 when he undertook the same role for the New York Tribune. He was also a columnist for Vanity Fair. The treatise Foster's Complete Hoyle: An Encyclopedia of All the Indoor Games Played at the Present Day, first published in 1897, has been called his great achievement. It provided descriptions and laws of more than 100 indoor games and was revised frequently during his lifetime, then by others after his death. One of his last editions was included in the 1939 New York World's Fair Westinghouse Time Capsule, to be opened in 5000 years.

Having written numerous whist and bridge books by 1935, he was considered "the dean of living bridge authorities". At that time he directed duplicate bridge at the St. George Club in Brooklyn (Hotel St. George). At some time he lived four years in Germany; at another time, "three years in South Africa, where he lectured and taught bridge in sixty-five towns." He crossed the Atlantic 97 times in all.

Foster was a member of several card, athletic, and golf clubs—including Knickerbockers Whist and the Cavendish Club (Note: Other clubs included: Savage, National Liberal (London), Pacific Coast Club, Los Angeles Athletic Club, Wheatley Hills Golf Club, Deauville Beach Club.)—and a member of the Society of American Magicians. He died December 25, 1945, in Eastham, Massachusetts, survived by one daughter.

== Memory trainer ==
Foster left employment at one of the largest manufacturing houses in Baltimore to become the business manager for "Professor Alphonse Loisette" (later identified as Marcus Dwight Larrowe), a lecturer and promoter of systems and methods to develop and improve memory skills. Foster resigned in April 1888, wishing not to be associated with Loisette's unethical personal and business practices and accusing him of being a "humbug and a fraud". Foster subsequently joined William Joseph Ennever and others in a similar business venture, the Pelman School of Memory Training, a correspondence school based in Chicago and London. He delivered lectures and wrote training materials, most notably The Secret of Certainty in Recollection, plainly stated, simply taught: The Pelman–Foster System, a book of five correspondence lessons dating from around 1905. (Note: According to this source: Loisette/Larrowe and Pelman/Pöhlmann probably knew each other in London, and one plagiarized the other. Later experts on early psychology believed that Loisette was a plagiarist. Foster's role in the dissemination is not clear. One March 1906 newspaper advertisement identified R.F. Foster as "the author" of the system.)

== Fiction book author ==
Foster also wrote a detective novel titled Cab no. 44, which was also translated into German.

== Bibliography ==
Although he also wrote fiction and contributed short stories to magazines, his most prolific work was on the subject of card, dice and table games being author of over 50 such books covering every imaginable card game: euchre, poker, conquian, rummy, whist, auction bridge, contract bridge, and other bridge variations, and many more. Foster also wrote on other games such as mahjong, dice, chess, and dominoes.

- Foster's Whist Manual: A Complete System of Instruction in the Game (New York: Brentano's, 1890), OCLC 559148057; (London: Mudie & Sons, 1890), OCLC 11215631; expanded 3rd ed. "with American leads", 1894, Brentano's, OCLC 4551043, facsimile 2005, Cosimo Classics, ISBN 9781596050570, OCLC 64686227
- Foster's Complete Hoyle: An Encyclopedia of All the Indoor Games Played at the Present Day With Suggestions for Good Play, a Full Code of Laws. Illustrative Hands. And a Brief Statement of the Doctrine of Chance as Applied to Games (1897), 625 pp.LCCN 04-11753 – after the 1740s–50s treatises by Edmond Hoyle
- Foster's Common Sense in Whist (1898); facsimile at Internet Archive
- Foster, Robert Frederick: Poker (1901)
- Foster's Bridge (1902)
- Foster, Robert Frederick: Foster's Practical Poker (1904)
- Foster's Complete Hoyle: An Encyclopedia of Games (1909)
- Foster, Robert Frederick: Pocket Laws of Poker (1910)
- Cooncan (Conquián): A Game of Cards also Called "Rum" (NY: Frederick A. Stokes, 1913), OCLC 4895626; full-text reproduction at rummy-games.com (now in the public domain); 2007 print edition, ISBN 0-548-31771-2
- Foster's Pirate Bridge: The Latest Development of Auction Bridge with the Full Code of the Official Laws (1917) ISBN 978-1-4446-4360-2
- Foster's Skat Manual (1922)
- Foster's Modern Bridge Tactics: A Complete Exposition of the Lates Theories of Four-card Suit Bids, Approaching Bids, and Suit Distribution, Together with an Entirely New Theory of the No-trumper (1925)

== Contributions to whist and bridge ==
Foster invented or developed:

- Self-playing Cards for Whist, Self-playing Cards for Bridge, and an improved design for Whist Markers.
- The Foster Echo, an unblocking play against notrump intended to show count.
- The Rule of Eleven. Foster claims to have invented the Rule of Eleven in the winter of 1880–81. The rule is explained in the first edition of his Foster's Whist Manual of 1890 and is a means for opener's partner to infer how many cards held by declarer are higher in rank than the card led; likewise, declarer can infer the same information about his right-hand-opponent's holding.
- The first set of laws for contract bridge.
