= Black Maria (card game) =

British card game of the Hearts group for three to six players

- A trick-avoidance game
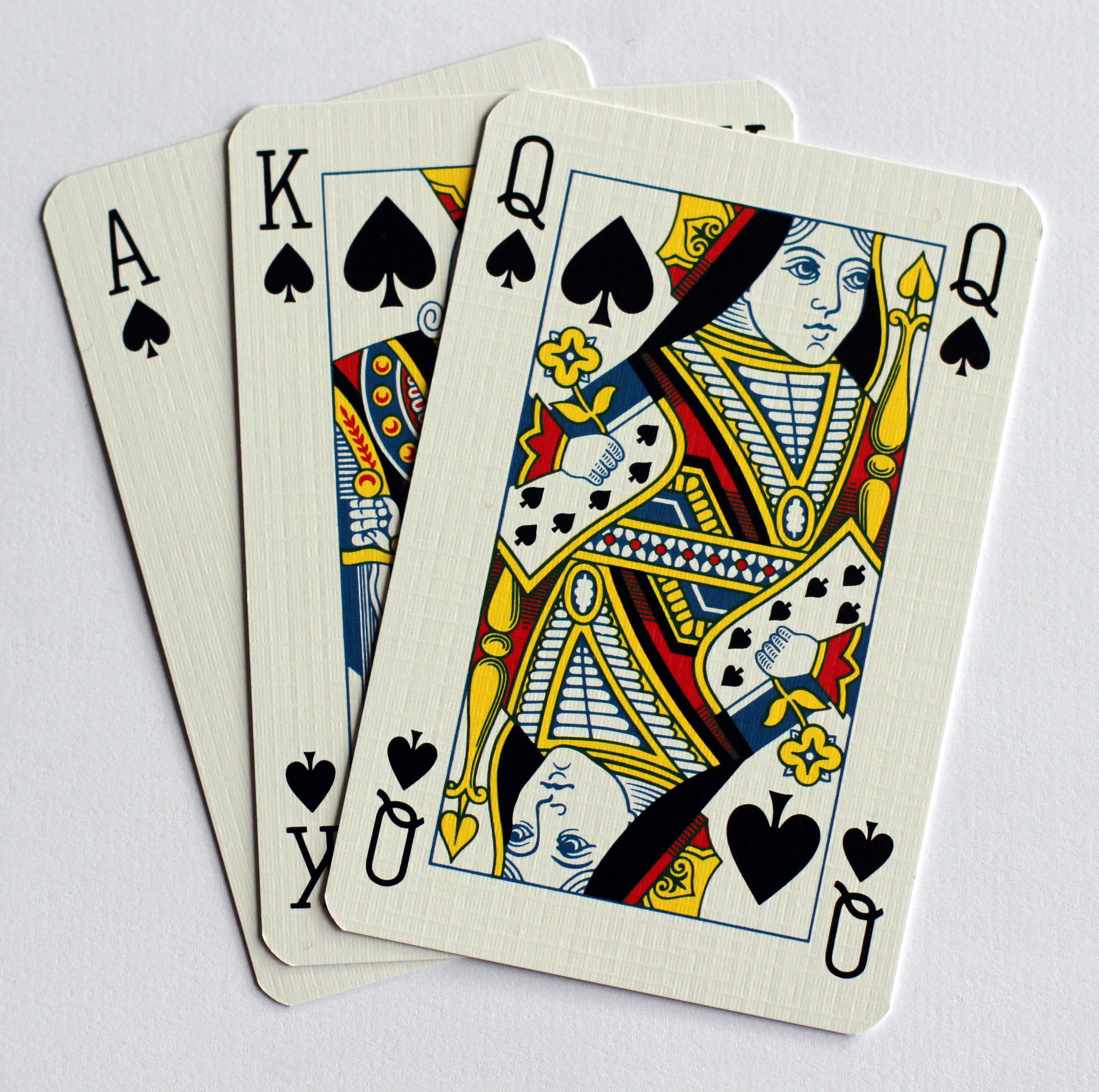
- The top penalty cards in Black Maria
- Origin: Britain
- Alternative names: Black Lady
- Type: Reverse game
- Players: 3–6 (3 is best)
- Skills: Card counting, Tactics
- Cards: 51 cards for 3 players
- Deck: French
- Rank (high→low): A K Q J 10 9 8 7 6 5 4 3 2
- Play: Clockwise
- Playing time: 10 minutes per hand
- Chance: Low – moderate

Related games
- Black Lady • Hearts
- Aim: avoid capturing hearts, the ♠A, ♠K or ♠Q

Black Maria (Note: /məˈraɪə/ mə-RY-ə, rhyming with "messiah" and not "idea".) is a popular British card game of the Hearts group for three to six players. It is an elaboration of Black Lady, itself a development of the original American game of Hearts, the progenitor of the group. Black Maria is regarded as one of the best games for three players.

The name of the game is derived from the nickname given to the Queen of Spades which plays a key role. The name Black Maria is sometimes used, confusingly, for the related American game of Black Lady; likewise this game is occasionally referred to as Black Lady. (Note: Sources giving the name Black Lady as an alternative for Black Maria include The Card Game Set (2003) and its successor The Card Game Bible (2014). Sources giving the name Black Maria to Black Lady include Bathe (1998) and Katz (2012).) While many of the games of the Hearts family may be considered as variants of 'basic' Hearts, Black Maria is "sufficiently different and popular" to justify being described as a separate game.

== History and naming ==
In the Penguin Hoyle of 1958, English economist, journalist and bridge player, Hubert Phillips claims to have invented Black Maria during the First World War. Its rules first appears in print in The Complete Book of Card Games in 1939, where Phillips and co-author, B.C. Westall, referring to three-player games, describe it as "the best of them all". Although Black Maria is its most common name, it is occasionally called Black Lady which, however, usually refers to the popular American variant of Hearts that features the Queen of Spades (the Black Lady) as the only high-scoring penalty card, as opposed to the three top penalty cards that characterise Black Maria. One source states that an alternative name is Slippery Anne, although this is also an alternative name for Black Lady, while several sources erroneously give the name Black Maria to the game of Black Lady. (Note: See, for example, Parlett (1991), Bathe (1998) and Katz (2012).)

== Cards ==
The games uses a standard French pack, normally of the English pattern, with 13 cards in each of the four suits: Hearts, Spades, Diamonds and Clubs. The cards rank in their natural order, Aces high: A K Q J 10 9 8 7 6 5 4 3 2. There is no trump suit.

== Players ==
The game is best suited to three players, but may also be played by four, five or six. In the case of the three player game, the 2♣ is removed from the pack. If five play, the 2♣ and 2♦ are removed and, if six play, all four 2s are removed.

== Aim ==
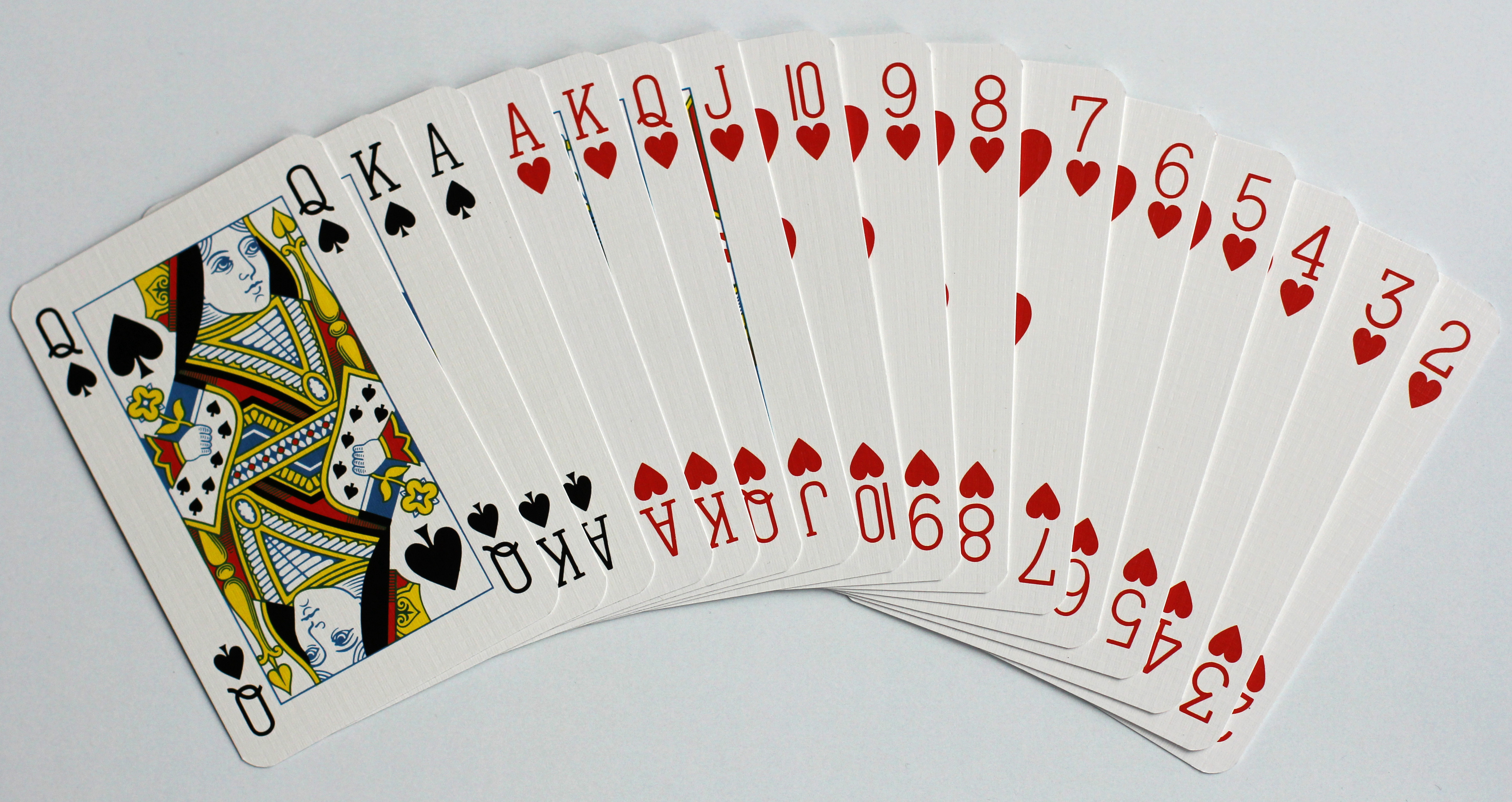
Penalty cards in Black Maria

The aim of Black Maria is to avoid capturing the penalty cards in tricks. The penalty cards are all the hearts, A♠, K♠ and Q♠ (Black Maria).

== Rules ==
The following rules are based on Arnold (1995).

=== Dealing ===
The dealer may be chosen by cards; lowest deals. Deal and play are clockwise. After shuffling the cards and having them cut, the dealer deals 17 cards to each player, one by one and face down, beginning with eldest hand (left of dealer).

=== Playing ===
Players examine their hands and pass three cards, face down, to their right-hand neighbours. They must not view the cards they receive until they have selected and passed on their three discards. Eldest hand leads to the first trick. Tricks are won by the highest card of the led suit and the trick winner leads to the next.

=== Scoring ===
The penalty cards score as follows:

- Each heart taken – 1 point
- A♠ – 7 points
- K♠ (Black Baz) – 10 points
- Q♠ (Black Maria) – 13 points

At the end of the deal, players tot up their penalty points which should collectively add up to 43 points.

=== Winning ===
The winner is the player with the lowest score after an agreed number of deals (usually divisible by three so that everyone has the same number of turns as dealer).

=== Slam ===
Arnold mentions a type of slam known as 'hitting the moon' as an optional rule whereby a player with a poor hand is able to capture all the penalty cards. If successful, the score is reduced by 43 points. Most descriptions of the game do not mention a slam or 'take-all', although it is common in other games of the Hearts family.

== Dirty Lady ==
A variant called Dirty Lady or ‘Dirty Janet’ is described by Headington in 1972. It differs from Arnold as follows:

- Three players are assumed.
- The ♦2 is removed.
- The 3 discards are passed to the left and must not include the ♠Q.
- Penalty points: ♠Q 13, ♥A 5, ♥K 4, ♥Q 3, ♥J 2 and all other Hearts 1 each.
- Collecting all 14 penalty cards counts in the player's favour.

== Literature ==
- Encyclopedia Americana. Vol. 14. Grolier. 1994. ISBN 978-07172-0125-9.
- _ (2009). The Little Giant Encyclopedia. Diagram Group, Sterling, New York/London. ISBN 978-1-4027-6417-2
- _ (2014). The Card Games Bible. Octopus, London. ISBN 978-0-600-62994-8
- Arnold, Peter (1995) [1988]. The Book of Card Games. New York: Barnes and Noble. ISBN 1-56619-950-6.
- Bathe, N.A.C. (1998) Card Games. Robert Frederick. ISBN 978-0907-78471-5
- Glenn, Jim and Carey Denton (2003). The Treasury of Family Games. Reader's Digest Association. ISBN 978-0762-10431-4
- Headington, Rodney (1972). "Dirty Lady" in Games and Puzzles. Issue 2. p. 22.
- Katz, Nikki (2012). The Book of Card Games. Simon & Schuster, Avon MA. ISBN 978-1-4405-6014-9
- Parlett, David (1991). A History of Card Games, OUP, Oxford. ISBN 0-19-282905-X
- Parlett, David (2008). The Penguin Book of Card Games. London: Penguin. ISBN 978-0-141-03787-5.
- Pennycook, Andrew (1982). The Book of Card Games. London, NY, Sydney, Ontario and Auckland: Granada. ISBN 0-583-12910-2
- Phillips, Hubert; Westall, B.C (1939). The Complete Book of Card Games. London: Witherby.
- Rigal, Bruce (2011). Card Games for Dummies. 2nd edn. Wiley, Hoboken. First published 2005. ISBN 0-19-282905-X
