= Oh hell =

Trick-taking card game

- Contract whist
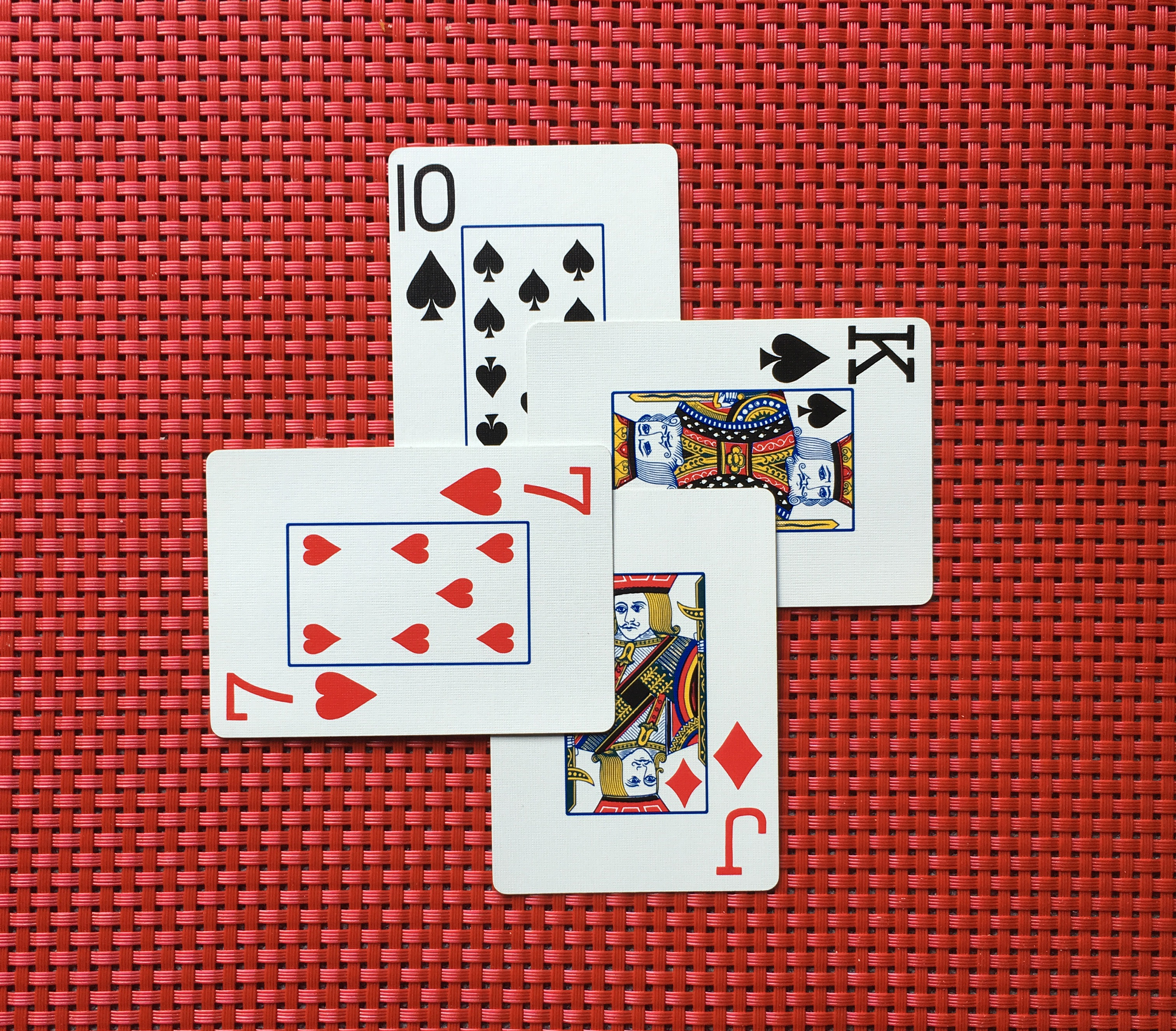
- Origin: England
- Alternative names: See Names section
- Type: Trick-taking
- Players: 3–7
- Skills: some
- Cards: 52 cards
- Deck: French
- Playing time: 25–50 minutes

Related games
- Bid whist; Bluke

Oh hell or contract whist is a trick-taking card game of British origin in which the object is to take exactly the number of tricks bid. (Note: Unlike contract bridge and spades, taking more tricks than bid is a fail.) It was first described by B. C. Westall around 1930 and originally called oh! well. It was said to have been introduced into America via the New York clubs in 1931. Phillips and Westall describe it as "one of the best round games".

== Name ==
This English game was originally called oh! well, but is often known as contract whist in Britain and, less commonly, as nomination whist, while American sources call it oh pshaw or more frequently oh hell. David Parlett gives other names: blackout, bust, elevator and jungle bridge; while John McLeod adds blob, so called because the player's predicted bid is overwritten with a black blob if not achieved.

== Concept ==
The game explores the idea of taking an exact number of tricks specified by a bid after the deal. Although the original game was played to 100 points, the modern variants differ from other trick-taking games in that players play a fixed number of deals. The game uses trumps, often decided by turning a card after the cards have been distributed. Like many popular social card games, the game has many local and regional variants in rules and variations in names.

== History ==
The rules are first described by B. C. Westall around 1930 under the name oh! well, and continued to be reprinted by Hubert Phillips until at least 1976. The game was introduced into the United States very shortly after appearing in Britain and was first recorded in the New York clubs in 1931. In these early rules, the number of cards dealt was fixed depending on the number of players and game was 100 points.

Over the decades the game has been elaborated both in Britain and the United States, usually by increasing or decreasing the number of cards dealt per round, e.g., increasing the number from one to seven, from three to seventeen, or from seven to one and back to seven again. The game has many alternative names, but "oh hell" is by far the most common.

The original version, known as "oh! well", was described as "one of the best round games".

== Rules ==
Four main variants are described below: the original British game known as oh! well, in which the number of cards dealt is the same every time (⇒), and three common modern variants. Nomination Whist is a British variant in which cards are dealt in descending and ascending (⇘⇗) sequence. In Australia and New Zealand this form is called, appropriately, 'Up and Down the River'. Oh Pshaw is an American name for the variant in which cards are dealt in ascending (⇗) sequence only (although Parlett describes a similar game as 'British Oh Hell'). Finally, the game as described below is a variant popular worldwide in which cards are also dealt in descending and ascending sequence (⇘⇗).

=== Common rules ===
There are common rules that apply to all four variants and will not be repeated. There are three to seven players. A standard pack is used and cards rank in their normal order, Aces high. Deal, bidding and play are clockwise, always beginning with eldest hand, the player to the left of the dealer. The aim is to score the most points by correctly bidding the number of tricks you will take. To that end, a bidding round takes place after the cards are dealt; eldest hand begins by announcing the number of tricks they think they can take, e.g., "none" or "five", and the other players follow in turn. During play, eldest leads to the first trick and players must follow suit if able; otherwise they may trump or discard as they wish. The highest trump wins the trick or, if no trumps are played, the highest card of the led suit wins. The trick winner leads to the next trick.

=== Oh! well ===
Phillips and Westall describe "oh! well" as "one of the best round games", not only appealing to expert players, but also to beginners and youngsters because of the simplicity of its rules, which are as above with the following additional details:

If three play, the bottom card of the pack is removed and set aside face down. If five, six or seven play, then 2, 4 or 3 cards, respectively, are removed from the bottom of the pack. Otherwise the full pack is used. The dealer distributes the cards and turns the last, which is his, for trump. The dealer or scribe records the bids. The same number of cards is dealt in each deal (⇒).

Players score 1 point for each trick taken. In addition, any player who achieves their exact bid scores a bonus of 10 points. Game is 100 points. If played for stakes, players pay the differences in their points converted into money at the agreed rate. Alternatively players ante a stake to the pool and the winner takes all.

=== Contract whist ===
In Britain a derivative of oh! well is played, known as contract whist or, less frequently, as nomination whist. The main difference is that the deals follow a descending and ascending(⇘⇗) sequence, in that the number of cards dealt starts at seven and decreases each time by one until only one card is dealt; it then rises again until finally seven cards are dealt again (7–1–7). The following rules are based on Arnold (2011):

Cards are dealt and the first one to receive a jack becomes the first dealer. Seven cards are then dealt to each player, one by one; the rest of the pack is placed face down as the stock and the top card turned for trump. In subsequent deals, the number of cards dealt reduces by one each time, so that by the seventh deal each player receives just one. In the eighth deal players receive two cards each and in the deals that follow, the number of cards dealt increases by one each time. The thirteenth deal is the last; seven cards are dealt and the game ends when it is over.

In the bidding, the dealer, who goes last as usual, must ensure that the total number of bids is not equal to the number of cards each player holds, thereby making it impossible for all players to make their bids.

As in oh! well, players score 1 point per trick and a bonus of 10 points if they achieve their bids. Otherwise the rules are as described above.

In a variation, the trump suit is fixed each time, rotating in the order: ♥ ♣ ♦ ♠.

Note that the name Nomination whist is given to at least two other games.

=== Up and down the river ===
In this Australian and Kiwi version, there are four to eight players, each dealt 10 cards in the first deal. Again the cards dealt follow a descending and ascending(⇘⇗) sequence, the number reducing by one each time until each player receives just one card. The sequence then ascends to 10 cards for a total of 19 deals (10–1–10). Again, the dealer must ensure bids do not add up to the number of tricks in the deal. Players score 1 point for each trick taken plus 10 points for achieving their bid.

=== Oh Pshaw ===
Oh Pshaw is an American variant recorded by Bicycle, who describe it as "an amusing game" with a worldwide following. It is an ascending only (⇗) variant and the rules are as described above with the following additions:

Bicycle says that 4 to 5 players are optimal. The game consists of a fixed number of deals. In the first, the dealer distributes one card to each player and turns the next for trump. In subsequent deals, the number of cards given to each player increases by one each time up to the maximum possible. So for example, if four play, there will be 13 deals. If three play, Bicycle advises limiting the game to 15 deals, rather than the theoretical maximum of 17. If no cards are left over in the last deal, the game is played at no trump.

Like oh! well, but unlike contract whist, there is no restriction on the dealer as to the number of tricks s/he may bid. However, the scorekeeper must announce whether the bid total is "over", "under" or "even" compared with the available number of tricks in the deal/number of cards each player holds.

The normal scoring scheme is that players who achieve their bid score 1 point for each trick taken plus 10 bonus points. Players who fail to achieve their bid score nothing. The player with the highest score at the end of the game is the winner. If played for hard score, the winner is given a further 10 point bonus and then players settle with one another based on the difference in their scores. Scoring variations include all players receiving 1 point per trick taken whether or not they achieve their bid; those who do achieve their bid still earn a bonus of 10; and players who announce a bid of “None” may score 5 points, 10 points, or 5 points plus 1 point for each trick in the deal, depending on local rules.

==== British variant ====
Oh Pshaw as described by Bicycle is almost identical with another ascending only (⇗) variant that Parlett calls British oh hell! Again, the number of cards dealt ascends from one to a number dependent on the number of players. There are no trumps if all the cards are dealt and there is no restriction on the dealer's bid. Players only score for the bonus, not the tricks. In a further variation, players bid simultaneously by clenching fists on the table and, on a signal being given, extending as many fingers as they intend to bid.

=== Oh hell ===
In the game as described by John McLeod at pagat.com, players draw for the first deal, the highest card winning. If three to five play, 10 cards are dealt to each player in the first deal; if six play, 8 cards, and, if seven play, 7 cards. Thereafter the number of cards dealt follows a descending and ascending (⇘⇗) sequence. So if 4 play, there are 19 deals (10–1–10); in the first and last deals 10 cards are dealt and, for example, in the 10th deal only one card is dealt per player.

Again, in this variant, the dealer is constrained to ensure that the total of the bids is not equal to the number of tricks in that deal. This is known as the hook. Cards are dealt and the next turned for trump.

There is a scorekeeper who keeps track of the bids and scores. McLeod describes two main systems:

- Simple scoring. The simplest system is that only players who achieve their bid exactly score any points. They score 1 point per trick plus a bonus of 10. Players who fail to match their bid score nothing. Games with this scoring are often called blackout or blob because the scorer writes a "1" in front of bids that were successful and scribbles out those that failed, so that they look like a black blob. (Note: In a book of games for children, Mulac (1946) calls this version Stinko.)
- Common scoring. The most widespread scoring scheme is to award all players 1 point per trick. In addition, those who match their bid exactly score the bonus of 10 as well. This gives everyone "a slight incentive" to try and take as many tricks as they can.
- Another variant includes scoring 10 plus the number of tricks taken for any bid above zero. For zero hands, the scoring is 5 plus the number of tricks available. This accounts for the relative ease of making zero hands early on and the increasing difficulty in later hands when more tricks are being bid on.

== Famous players ==
Prominent players of the game include former United States President Bill Clinton, who learned it from film director Steven Spielberg.

== Names ==
Oh hell is known by many names in English including:

- 765 (Pakistan)
- Blackout
- Blob (UK)
- Botheration
- Bust (Australia, New Zealand)
- Contract Whist (UK)
- Elevator
- Estimation hearts
- German Bridge (Hong Kong)
- Jungle Bridge
- Nomination whist (UK)
- Oh heck
- Oh hell (US)
- Oh pshaw (US)
- Oh! well (UK)
- Up and down the river (Australia, New Zealand)

== See also ==
- Bid whist
- Knock-out whist
- Wizard (card game)

== Literature ==
- Arnold, Peter (2009). Chambers Card Games for Families. Chambers Harrap, Edinburgh. ISBN 978-0550-10470-0
- Arnold, Peter (2011). Chambers Card Games, 2nd edn. London: Chambers Harrap. ISBN 978-0550-10179-2
- Kansil, Joli Quentin (2001). Bicycle Official Rules of Card Games, 90th edn. Cincinnati: Bicycle.
- Morehead, Albert and Geoffrey Mott-Smith (1957). Culbertson's Card Games Complete. Watford: Arco.
- Mulac, Margaret Elizabeth (1946). The Game Book. New York and London: Harper & Bros.
- Parlett, David (1991). A History of Card Games. Oxford: Oxford University Press ISBN 0-19-282905-X
- Parlett, David (1996). Oxford Dictionary of Card Games. Oxford: Oxford University Press ISBN 0-19-869173-4
- Parlett, David (2008). The Penguin Book of Card Games. London: Penguin. ISBN 978-0-141-03787-5
- Phillips, Hubert and B.C. Westall (1976). The Pan Book of Card Games. London: Witherby.
- Phillips, Hubert (1939). The Complete Book of Card Games. London: Pan Books.
- Spadaccini, Stephanie (2005). The Big Book of Rules. New York: Penguin. ISBN 9780452286443
