= 400 (card game) =

Card game

- Origin: Lebanon
- Alternative names: Four-hundred
- Type: Trick-taking
- Players: 4
- Skills: 7/10
- Cards: 52
- Deck: French
- Play: Clockwise
- Playing time: 25 min. to 2 hrs

Related games
- Spades

400 is a trick-taking card game played in two partnerships with a standard deck of 52 playing cards. The object of the game is to be the first team to reach forty-one points. The game somewhat resembles Spades, but with subtle differences. It was developed in the early years following the Ottoman Empire. Historically, the game is mainly played in Syria, Lebanon, Palestine, Jordan, Honduras, and The Philippines. It is similar to the game Tarneeb, which is also played in the region.

If a player does not receive a picture in their hand, the game can not proceed and the cards must be redealt.

If two players in a partnership reach the winning stage of 41 points or above, the game is over and the players team with most points wins the game.

== Object ==
To accumulate the most points at or beyond 41; points are accrued by winning at least the number of tricks bid in each hand, where each trick that is bid is worth one point. Hearts are always trump and other suits have no innate value. Cards rank: A K Q J 10 9 8 7 6 5 4 3 2

=== The deal ===
The first dealer is chosen by a draw for high card, and thereafter the turn to deal proceeds counter clockwise. The entire deck is dealt two or three cards at a time, face down, beginning on the dealer's right (The first deal being either one card or three cards per player, in order to arrive at thirteen cards each). The players then pick up their cards and arrange them by suits.

If one player prematurely runs out of cards, that is, either extra cards were dealt elsewhere or one or more cards are missing, the hand is considered void and the deal passes to the player's right.

=== Bidding ===
Each player decides how many tricks he will be able to take. The player to the dealer's right starts the bidding and, in turn, each player states how many tricks he expects to win. There is only one round of bidding. Every player must make a bid; no player may pass. No suit is named in the bid (hearts are always trump). The minimum bid for each player is two, regardless if the player can or cannot take two tricks. Also, when a player's point total is 30-39, his minimum bid becomes three. When a player reaches 40 points, his minimum bid becomes 4. If the player reaches 50 points (one can reach 50 and not win, as discussed below), his minimum bid becomes 5, and so on.

Although 400 is played in teams, bids are not done in "partnership"; each bid is independent of the partner's bid in a hand. If partner 'A' bids four tricks and partner 'B' bids three tricks, bringing the total to seven, 'A' and 'B' are bound by their respective bids. Should partner 'A' take five tricks and partner 'B' take two, 'A' will be credited with their original bid, while 'B' will not.

Unlike Spades, in 400 a hand will be considered void if the total sum of all four bids is under eleven. Should this occur, the deal automatically goes to the player's right and a new hand will begin. This process is repeated until the total amount of bid is equal to, or greater than eleven, however if a player's score is 30-39, the total will be 12 and if the score is 40-49, the total score must equal 13 and so forth.

==== Bidding variation ====
As noted above, the total bids must equal 11 in order for a hand to begin. However, some local house rules stipulate that when a member of any team reaches 30 points, the total bids in the hand must equal 12 for the hand to begin, because the person with 30 points now has a minimum bid of 3. The same occurs when a player reaches 40 points (his/her minimum bid is now 4, therefore the minimum number of bids is 13). Should a second player reach 30, the total bids in the hand should equal to 12. If any member opens their hand to no pictures including the Ace, the member can decide to re-deal the hand. Another variation requires one player to bid 5 tricks equalling to 10 points, but all other players must make minimum bid of 2 tricks. This variation is commonly referred to as 'five to run'. It is a popular variation because it speeds up the flow of the game.

Note: Missing a bid of 5 tricks will result in losing 10 points, as per the table below.

=== Game play ===
The game is played by hands. Each hand consists of a number of tricks (all hands contain 13 tricks i.e. 13x4=52). The player on the dealer's right makes the opening lead, and players must follow suit, if possible. If a player cannot follow suit, they may play any card. The trick is won by the player who plays the highest trump, or, if no trump was played, by the player who played the highest card in the suit led. The player that wins the trick gathers the cards up into their pile and leads next. Play continues until none of the players have any cards left. It is generally accepted that if one player has in their hand cards remaining such that they will take all of the remaining tricks (i.e. the A K Q of hearts when there are three cards left in their hand) then that player may simply lay down their hand and claim the remaining tricks, allowing the game to progress more quickly. If there is any type of communication with a partner before the hand has been given out, the other team may declare a reshuffle. If any communication is performed during the games, the team that communicated with each other will receive an automatic break for both partners and the receiving team will be allocated the points they initially called for, even if they were going to break. If a team shows three signs of communication, it is an automatic forfeit. The illegal communication includes talking about previous past or future plays. Whispering or showing slight mouth movements. Telling a player to hurry up, is not illegal communication. All hands must be played within a 10-second period, if a player has not played their hand within 10–20 seconds, they will automatically lose the hand, thus the winning hand will go to the second highest bidder.

=== Scoring ===
For making the contract (the number of tricks bid), the player scores 1 point for each trick bid. Missing a contract results in losing 1 point for each trick bid. In addition, bidding for a higher number of tricks results in a higher value of points, as follows:

Player's bid	Value in points
1 trick	-2 point
2 tricks	2 points
3 tricks	3 points
4 tricks	4 points
5 tricks	10 points
6 tricks	12 points
7 tricks	14 points
8 tricks	16 points
9 tricks	27 points
10 tricks	Win. (unless the person is negative then - 40 points)

==== Scoring variation ====
One of the players is the scorer and writes the bids down, so that during the play and for the scoring afterward, this information will be available to all the players. When a hand is over, the scores should be recorded next to the bids, and a running score should be kept so that players can readily see each other's total points. If there is a tie, then all players participate in (at least) one more round of play. Once a member of the team reaches or exceeds 41 points, the game is over, provided his/her partner's points are positive. If a player is negative, play must continue until the player is positive, or if the other team reaches 41 before the former (of course, the other team must also be positive -one of them having at least 41- in order to win).

Once a player reaches 30 points or more, 5 tricks are counted as 5 (some will still consider 5 tricks to equal 10 in order to make the game go faster. If both parties agree to it before the beginning of the game), 6 tricks as six, however 7 tricks are still considered 14.

the game usually ends when one player reaches 41 points but there is some exception

1.) if the player partner is in a negative score he should continue until his partner is above zero (all bids according to roles mentioned before 40 ~ 4 50 ~ 5 etc. )

2.) if two opponents reach or surpass the score of 41 at the same time, then the game should continue to a score of 51 or until one of them drops below 41 (all bids according to roles mentioned before 40 ~ 4 50 ~ 5 etc. )

== See also ==
- Tarneeb
- Trump cards
