= Misdeal =

Misdeal may refer to

- Misdeal (cards)
- Maldone 1928 French silent film
- Best Revenge (film), 1984 Canadian film
- Misdeal play by Basil Woon, made into Recaptured Love, 1930 film
- Misdeal, horse, 1843 winner of St. James's Palace Stakes
