= Bluke =

Trick-taking card game

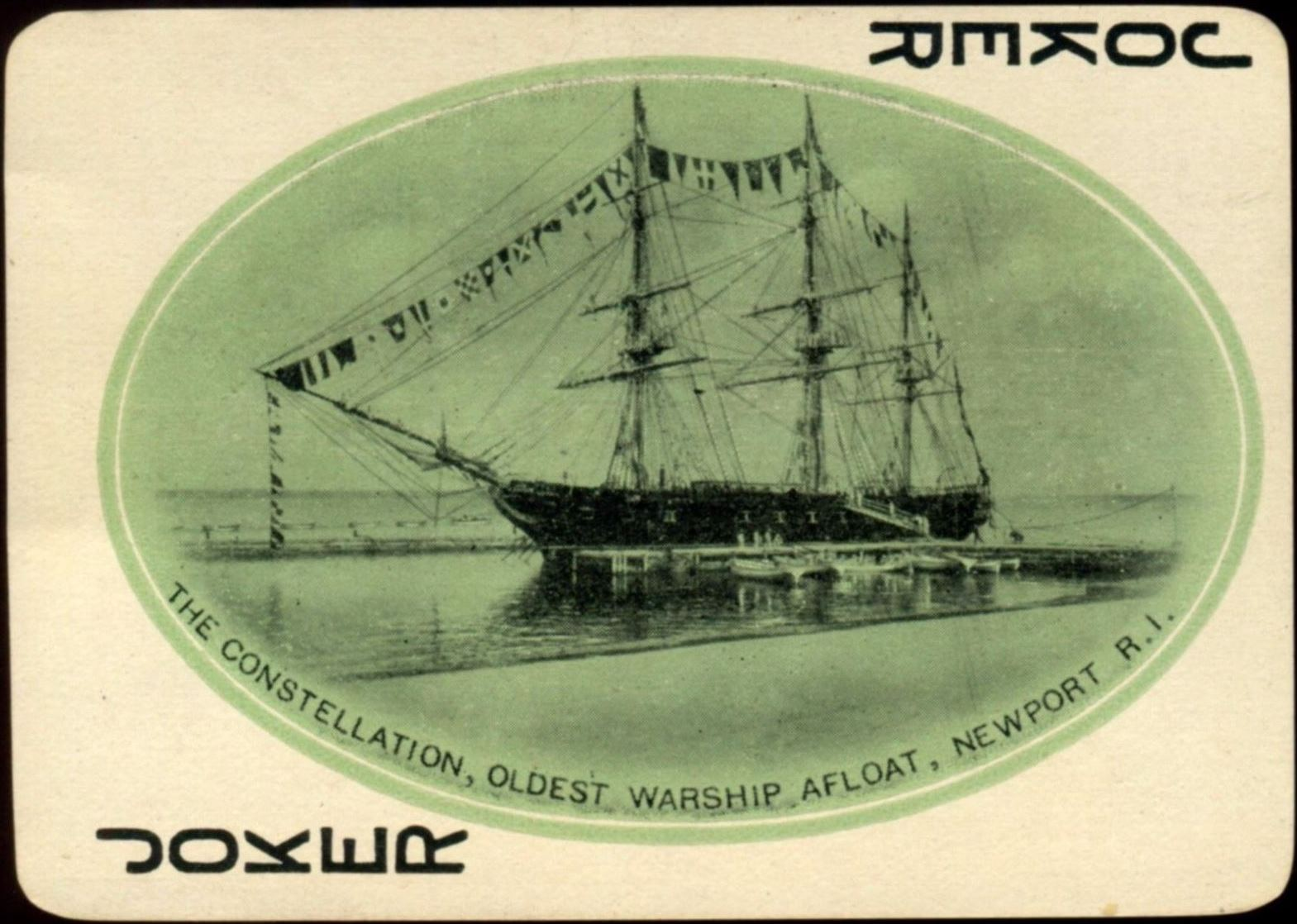
- In this game, jokers are known as Blukes, which beat all other cards
- Origin: United States
- Alternative names: Blook
- Type: Trick-taking
- Players: 3-4
- Cards: 52 cards
- Deck: French

Related games
- Oh hell

Bluke or Blook is a trick-taking card game known to parts of the East Coast and the Midwest and possibly other parts of the United States of America. The game features use of the Jokers, which are sometimes referred to as the Blukes. One version goes under the name Back Alley or Blooper and appears to be a game that originated in the American military probably during the Second World War.

== Dealing ==
Bluke is best played with three or four players. Although less exciting, it can be played as a two-player game. It can also be played with five or more players (up to about 15), but for larger games the dealing must be altered and the game is thereby shortened.

Bluke is a trump game using a traditional poker deck of 52 cards, plus the 2 jokers. The number of cards dealt changes with every hand.

To begin the game, each player draws a card from the deck. The player who draws the highest card is the first dealer.

In a 2 to 4 player game, the dealer deals 13 cards to each player on the first hand, dealing clockwise. After the first hand, dealing is passed to the player on the dealer's left, who deals 12 cards on the second hand. Then 11 cards are dealt on the third hand, and so on until only 1 card is dealt, after which 2 are dealt, then 3, and so on all the way back to 13 (see more about ending the game below).

Thus for a standard game of Bluke, a total of 25 hands are dealt. One player needs to be designated as score-keeper and will record bids, tally scores and keep track of how many cards are to be dealt for each hand.

== Hi Bluke, Lo Bluke and Trump ==
Once a hand has been dealt, the remaining cards (2 or more) are passed face down to the player on the dealer's left who cuts the deck (or taps it if they wish to select the top card). The dealer turns up the top card, and the suit that comes up will be the trump suit for that hand. If the card that comes up is a Bluke (one of the 2 jokers), then there is no trump for that hand.

When there is trump, any card of the trump suit outranks any card of a non-trump suit, with the exception of the 2 Blukes, which are the highest ranking cards in the deck. The highest card of each suit is the Ace, followed by King, Queen, Jack, 10, 9, 8, 7, 6, 5, 4, 3 and 2.

At the outset of the game, players must be informed which of the two Blukes is Hi Bluke and which is Lo Bluke. (Usually Hi Bluke is red while Lo Bluke is black, or Lo Bluke has small writing where Hi Bluke has none. Some decks will require markings to be added to the Bluke cards to distinguish Hi from Lo.) No card outranks Hi Bluke. Lo Bluke can only be beaten by Hi Bluke.

== Play ==
The player on the dealer's left lays the first card, followed in a clockwise direction by the other players, who each lay one card. The highest card takes the trick.

Players must follow suit if they have it, unless they have a Bluke. Blukes may be played at any time, and this adds an element of surprise to the game, and makes the Blukes extremely powerful cards to possess.

=== Example ===
For example, in a four-player game, spades are trump, and the following cards have been played:

- Player 1: Jack of Diamonds
- Player 2: King of Diamonds
- Player 3 has a 6 of Diamonds in his hand, but he also has the Lo Bluke. In the absence of holding one of the Blukes, he would have to play the 6 of Diamonds, but he now has the option to play the Bluke, which he plays.

Now, if Player 4 has the Hi Bluke, she may play it and overpower the Lo Bluke and take the trick. Suppose Player 4 had no Bluke but played trump (let us say the 2 of Spades), this would not win the trick for Player 4, because Blukes are higher than trump.

== Bidding and Scoring ==
What makes Bluke challenging is the bidding. Once the cards are dealt, the remaining cards in the blind have been cut, and the trump suit (or "no trump") is determined, each player may make a bid from 1 to the total number of cards dealt, beginning with the player on the dealer's left.

=== Going Set ===
The bid is like a contract; it represents the number of tricks the player thinks they will take. However, players must be careful not to bid too high because if they take fewer tricks than the number of their bid, they go set and lose ten points times the number bid, regardless of how many tricks were actually taken. For example, John bid 4, but took no tricks, so he gets -40 points. Even if John bid 4 and took three tricks, the result is the same: -40 points.

Unlike most card games, it is not only possible but very easy to find yourself starting the game with a negative score after the first hand. A truly greedy and foolish player will find him or herself deep in the hole after only a few hands.

=== Making Your Bid ===
If a player "makes" their bid, they get 10 points times the number of tricks bid, plus one point for each additional trick.

For example, Betsy bid 3, and took 5 tricks. So she gets 30 for the 3 she bid, and 2 "overtricks", for a total of 32 to be added to her score.

== Scorekeeping ==
The scorekeeper will need a fairly large sheet or pad of paper to keep the scores, making one large column for each player and within that column a small column on the left for recording the bid, with scores to be kept in the remaining (larger) column to the right. One small column to the far left is needed to write the number of cards being dealt.

=== Sample Scorecard ===
Here is a sample scorecard, showing the first 3 hands:

Scorecard for Bluke
Deal	John	Margaret	Steve	Betsy
13	3 31	3 -30	2 22	5 50
12	2 11	4 -70	5 -28	3 82
11	1 22	4 -29	1 -18	3 112
10
etc

On the first hand, only Margaret went set. Betsy met her bid exactly. John got 1 overtrick, and Steve got 2.

On the second hand, John, Margaret and Steve all went set. Betsy got 2 overtricks.

On the third hand, no players went set. Steve and Betsy met their bids exactly, and Margaret and John got 1 overtrick each.

== Ending the game, and variations ==
The player with the highest score at the end of the game is declared the winner.

A standard 2 to 4 player game of Bluke begins and ends with 13 cards. However, with a deck of 54 cards including the Blukes it is possible to continue the game up to 17 cards in 3-player Bluke, or 18 if players agree that the last hand is automatically a "no trump" hand.

2-player Bluke could conceivably end on a 26-card "no trump" hand, but in general 4-player is more exciting than 3-player and 3-player is more exciting than 2-player, so it is probably advisable for 2 players to stick to the standard format of starting with 13 cards, playing down to 1 and finishing the game at 13 cards.

With 5 or more players, the game can be even more challenging, but will also be a shorter game by necessity. The upward limit of the number of cards that can be dealt for games with 5 or more players is:

- 5 players: 10 cards (21 hands total)
- 6 players: 8 cards (15 hands total)
- 7 players: 7 cards (13 hands total)
- 8 players: 6 cards (11 hands total)
- 9 or 10 players: 5 cards (9 hands total)
- 10 players: 5 cards (9 hands total)
- 11-13 players: 4 cards (7 hands total)
- 14-15 players: 3 cards (5 hands total)

Note: With 6 and 8 players, an additional "no trump" hand can be played by dealing out all the cards, making the hand a "no trump" hand automatically, but that is not considered standard play.

=== "New Jersey" variant ===
One variant of Bluke (perhaps the original) known to have been played in New Jersey differs from the standard rules given above in two respects:

1. The order of cards is the opposite, with players being dealt 1 card on the first hand, continuing up to 13 cards on the 13th hand and then continuing back down to 1. This makes for a shorter game.
2. Blukes are considered part of the trump suit and must be played as such. So for example, if Player 1 plays spades and player 2 has no spades other than a Bluke, that player must play the Bluke. Or to take another example: spades are trump and player 1 plays the Ace of hearts; Player 2 holds a Bluke, but also holds one heart, which they must play.

== Creative scoring ==
The scoring example above does not tell us exactly how many tricks each player took. Here we add that information:

=== Scorecard ===
Creative Scorecard for Bluke
Deal	John	Margaret	Steve	Betsy
13/13	4/3 31	0/3 -30	4/2 22	5/5 50
14/12	1/2 11	2/4 -70	3/5 -28	5/3 82
10/11	2/1 22	5/4 -29	1/1 -18	3/3 112
_/10
etc

On the first hand, the players collectively bid the full number of tricks (13 of 13); John bid 3 and took 4, and so on.

On the second hand, the players collectively overbid (14 of 12).

On the third hand, the players collectively underbid (10 of 11).

While it is not entirely necessary to record the number of tricks taken for a player who went set, this method of scorekeeping does help avoid scoring errors. It also allows the scorekeeper to tally the total number of tricks taken and the total number of bids for each player.

For the scorekeeper who enjoys statistics, there are only three outcomes for each player on each hand. Either the player goes set (S), gets overtricks (O) or makes a perfect bid (P). At the bottom of the scorecard the scorekeeper can include rows labeled "S", "O", and "P". Circling each hand a player goes set and drawing a square box around each hand a player gets a perfect bid (taking the same number of tricks as bid), allows the scorekeeper to easily tally these at the end of the game.

An overly cautious player may have many overtricks but few sets. The greedy player who went set the most will typically lose the game. The skilful player who has the most perfect bids and/or the least sets and overtricks will typically win the game.
