= Tarneeb =

Middle Eastern card game

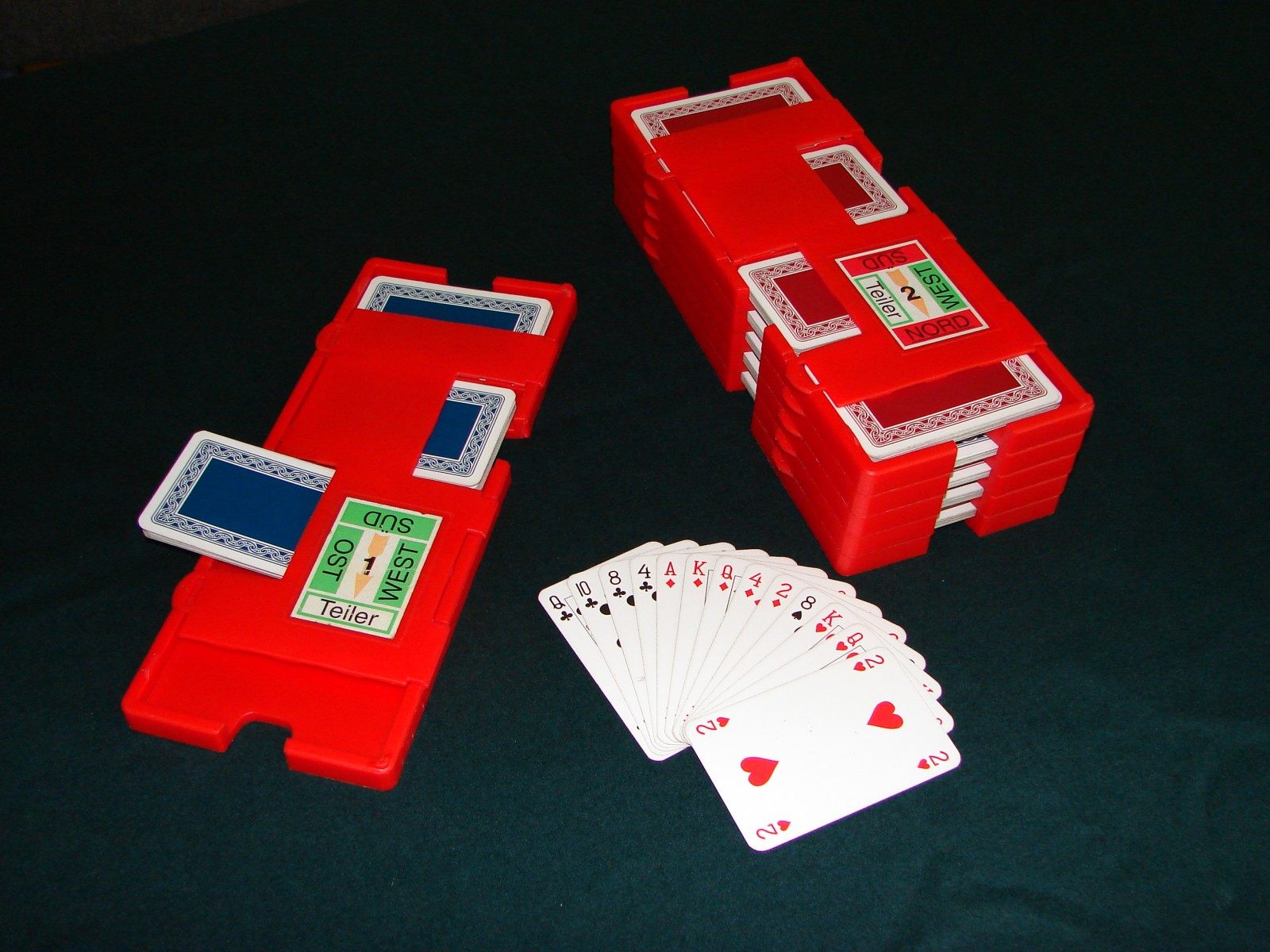
- Origin: Levant
- Type: Trick-taking
- Players: 4
- Cards: 52
- Deck: French
- Rank (high→low): A K Q J 10 9 8 7 6 5 4 3 2
- Play: counter-clockwise

Related games
- 400

Tarneeb (Arabic: طرنيب, romanized: ṭarnīb, lit. 'trump'), also spelled tarnibe and tarnib, and called hakam (حكم ḥakam) in the Arabian Peninsula, is a plain trick-taking card game played in various Middle Eastern countries, most notably in the countries of the Levant, and Tanzania. The game may be considered a variation of Whist, or a version of Spades.

== History ==
Historically the game can be traced back to the Levant, however the game seems to have truly flourished only from the early 18th century.

== Overview ==
The aim is to win a set of continuous hands. There are four players in partnerships of two teams. A standard 52 card deck is used, each suit ranking in the usual way from Ace (high) down to two (low). The game is played anti-clockwise. Teams stay together for all the games of a set. In a tournament, at the end of a set, the losing team is replaced for the next set.

Partners sit opposite each other, often at a table in such a way that no player can see the cards of other players (see seating charting image). Either player of a team may collect the winning tricks.

The first dealer is chosen at random; thereafter the deal passes to the right. The cards are shuffled then cut by the player to the dealer's left, and are all dealt out beginning with first hand, the player to the dealer's right. Cards are dealt either singly or in packets of 13, so that everyone has 13 cards.

== Auction ==
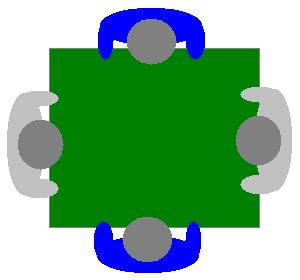
Tarneeb seating arrangement.

There is now a round of bidding with immediate raise. First hand opens and bidding continues anti-clockwise. Players may pass or make a bid for seven or more tricks. A bid for a higher number of tricks outranking one for a lower number. A player may bid once unless outbid by a later player, in which case the earlier player may raise. A player who has passed may not re-enter the auction. A player may reshuffle if none of their suits have any of the following: an Ace, or a King with one other card in the suit, or a Queen with two, or a Jack with three. If the player’s cards have, for example, no face cards except for one Jack of spades and only two other spades the Jack is considered unsupported and they may ask for a reshuffle.

Some circles allow partners to share how good their cards are i.e., helpful, not helpful at all. However, this is normally against the rules.

== Play ==
The objective of the declaring team is to take at least the number of tricks that they bid. The aim of the defenders is to hinder the declaring team from reaching their declared bid.

The player who won the auction leads to the first trick. In turn, players play a card to the trick and must follow suit if they can; otherwise may play any card. A trick is won by the highest tarneeb (trump) in it, if any. If there are no tarneebs in the trick, the highest card of the suit led wins it. The winner of a trick leads to the next.

In some regions, the declarer must start the first trick with his declared tarneeb suit.

== Scoring ==
Once all thirteen tricks are played, the scores of the two sides are calculated by adding the tricks each side has won. If the declaring side takes at least the number of tricks bid, then they score the number of tricks they have, otherwise, the bid is subtracted from their score and the opposing team scores the number of tricks they collected themselves. It is possible, therefore, to have a negative score. The set ends when one team reaches forty-one (41) and the losing team is replaced for the next set.

A team can also win the game by either making a set of 13 tricks.

=== Scoring variations ===
- In some regions, a set ends when a team reaches 31 or 61 rather than 41.
- A team can not win if 13 tricks are won if a lower bet was offered (in Falamanki Dubai as per Mr. Rabih)
- A team can not win if their current score is below 0

== Game strategies ==
- Keep tarneeb count: Every player should know how many tarneebs are out and how many are left at any point in the game. This is most crucial for the declarer who should always know how many tarneebs are out.
- Tashleeh (تشليح tashlīḥ): If you are the declarer, try to eliminate as many tarneebs from the game as possible.
- Ta'leem (تعليم taʿlīm): If your partner is the declarer and you run out of tarneebs, signal to your partner what suit you want him to follow on the next trick by using a low card of that suit.
- Hints: If you want your partner to return the same suit on the next turn, slam the card on the table as you play. Note that this practice is not allowed in some areas and generally frowned upon as not very professional behavior.
- Na'f: When you finish a suit, throw the last card with a (flick) which hints your partner. This also is not always allowed.
- Second lowest/third highest: for any trick, a good rule of thumb is for the second player to use the lowest card, and the third player to use the highest card.

== See also ==
- Whist
- Contract bridge
- 400 (card game)
