= Wizard (card game) =

Trick-taking card game

- Logo

- Card back
- Origin: Haliburton, Ontario
- Named variants: Fantasy Wizard; Medieval Wizard; Wizard Junior; Wizard Camelot; Wizard Omnibus
- Designer: Ken Fisher
- Publisher: Self (until 1986); Waddington Publishing (from 1986 to 1994); U.S. Games Systems, Inc. (since 1994)
- Release date: 1986
- Type: Trick-taking
- Players: 3-6 players
- Age range: 10+
- Cards: 60
- Play: Clockwise
- Playing time: 45 minutes

Related games
- Oh hell
- Website: wizardcards.com

Wizard is a trick-taking card game for three to six players designed by Ken Fisher of Toronto, Ontario in 1984. The game was first printed commercially in June 1986. The game is based on oh hell.

A Wizard deck consists of 60 cards: a regular set of 52 playing cards (replaced with custom symbols and colours in some editions), 4 Wizards and 4 Jesters. The Jesters have the lowest value, then the two up to thirteen, then Aces and lastly Wizards as highest in value.

== Gameplay ==
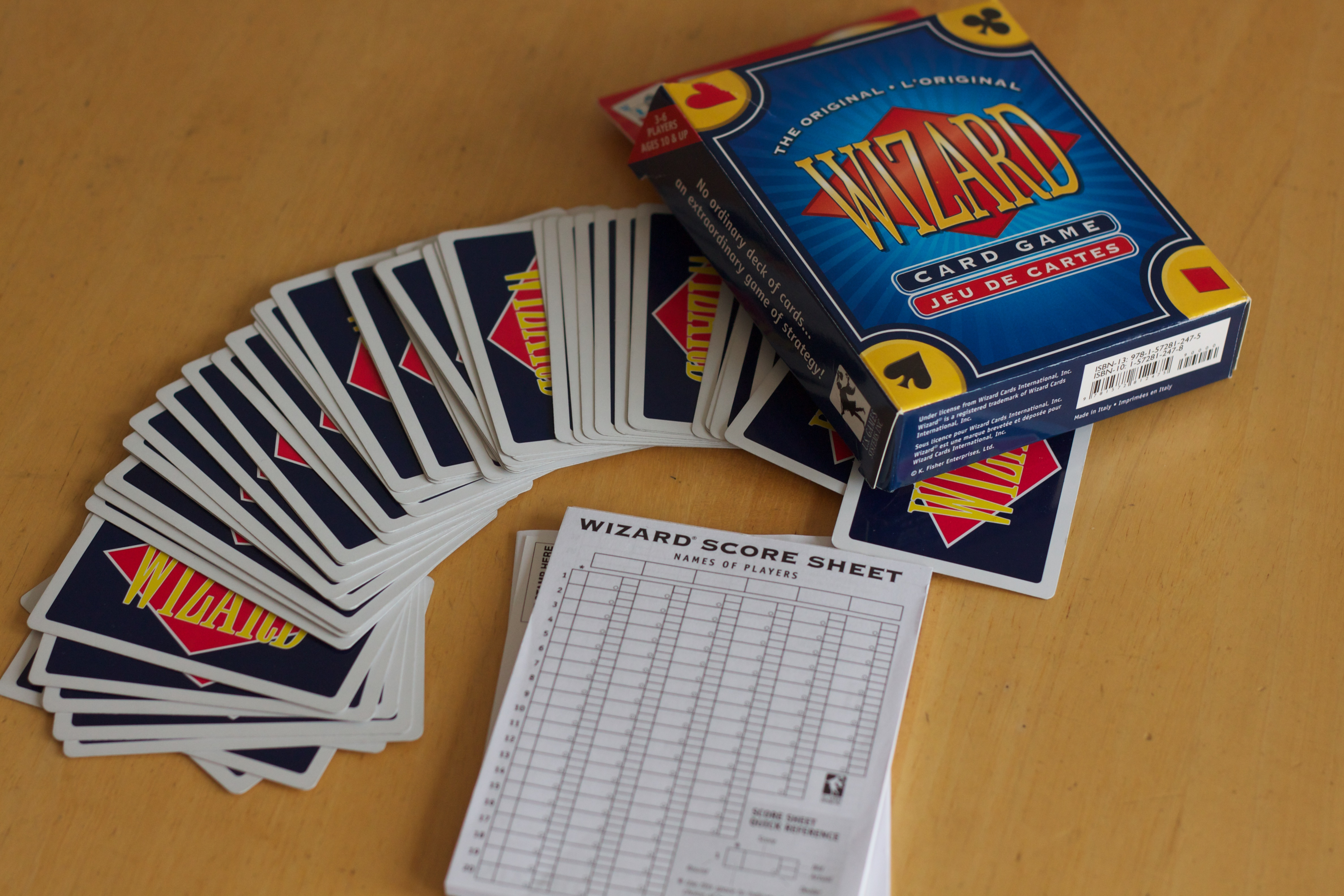
Cards, box, and scorecard

The objective of the game is to bid correctly on the number of tricks that a player will take in the subsequent round of play. Points are awarded for a correct bid and subtracted for an incorrect bid. The player with most points after all rounds have been played is the winner. The game is played in a number of rounds from 10 to 20, depending on the number of players, and each round consists of three stages: Dealing, Bidding, and Playing.

In the first round every player gets one card. In the subsequent rounds the number of cards is increased by one until all cards are distributed. That means that three players play 20 rounds, four players 15 rounds, five players 12 rounds and six players 10 rounds. The top card of the remaining cards is turned over to determine the trump suit. If there are no cards left or a jester is turned, there is no trump suit, and only the wizards are trump. If a wizard is turned, the dealer picks a trump suit.

Score sheet demonstrating the varying game length depending on the number of players.

After looking at their cards, starting with the player to the dealer's left, each player states how many tricks they believe they will take, from zero to the number of cards dealt. This is recorded on a score pad.

The player to the left of the dealer plays a card, and then the others follow clockwise. If a card other than a wizard or jester is played, the players have to follow suit, but it is possible to play a jester or wizard although the player has the desired suit. The Wizard beats all other cards but the first one in a trick beats all others. The jester is beaten by all others, but if all cards in a trick are jesters the first one beats the others. If a jester is played as the first card the first suit card decides which suit has to be followed. If a wizard is played as the first card every player is free to play what they want regardless of the others. If the first card is a Jester and the second a Wizard, then the Wizard rule takes precedence and players are not required to follow suit.

At the end of each round, each player is given a score based on their performance. For predicting the number of tricks taken correctly, a player receives 20 points plus 10 points for each trick taken. For predicting the number of tricks taken incorrectly, a player loses 10 points for each trick over or under.

== Variant card sets ==
The German version of Wizard is published by Amigo-Spiele. Granted a license for manufacture and distribution in Germany in 1996, the cards were redesigned and illustrated with a fantasy-themed character on each card. Each character has a title such as der Krieger (the warrior) or die Priesterin (the priestess) printed at the top of the card. There are 2 male and 2 female versions of each character. The German decks contain four non-standard suits with values from 1 to 13, four Z cards labelled either der Zauberer (the sorcerer) or die Zauberin (the sorceress), and four N cards labelled der Narr or die Närrin (the fool). The German deck is distributed in the United States as "Fantasy Wizard", with an English box and rules. The cards are identical to the German ones, including the German abbreviations for Zauberer/Zauberin and Narr/Närrin.

The Medieval deck of cards has a themed character on each card. The characters are: (2) Hermit, (3) Peasant, (4) Farmer, (5) Archer, (6) Blacksmith, (7) Merchant, (8) Bard, (9) Scholar, (10) Bishop, Knight, Queen, King, (Ace) Dragon. The cards are also color-coded: Hearts (Red), Spades (Black), Clubs (Green), Diamonds (Purple), Jesters (Brown), Wizards (Blue).

The Wizard Camelot edition replaces the 4 deuces with Holy Grail, Excalibur, Merlin and Morgan le Fay cards.

The Wizard Omnibus edition enables 3 levels of play: Classic, Camelot and Magic.

== Tournament play ==
Tournaments are regularly held online, on the wizardcards website.

World Championships began in 2010. Each nation is invited to send a maximum of two representatives to the annual event.

Wizard World Championships
Year	Location	Champion	Champion's nationality
2010	Frankfurt, Germany	Josef Sigl	Germany
2011	Budapest, Hungary	Beate Punz	Austria
2012	Vienna, Austria	Thomas Kessler	Switzerland
2013	Amsterdam, the Netherlands	Christian Adolph	Germany
2014	Athens, Greece	Gergely Suba	Hungary
2015	Prague, Czech Republic	Hans Mostbock	Austria
2016	Budapest, Hungary	Robert Laschkolnig	Switzerland
2017	Riga, Latvia	Ignaz Punz	Austria
2018	Warsaw, Poland	Vasilis Papadakis	Greece
2019	Antwerp, Belgium	Spyros Keramas	Greece
2020	Cancelled due to COVID-19 pandemic	N/A	N/A
2021	Cancelled due to COVID-19 pandemic	N/A	N/A
2022	Vienna, Austria	Sebastian Holzer	Austria
2023	Prague, Czech Republic	Alexander Kube	Germany
2024	Stuttgart, Germany	Spyros Keramas	Greece
2025	Barcelona, Spain	Mario Phénix	Canada

In 2026, "WAIT" (Wizard Annual Invitational Tournament) was introduced, hosted by Ken Fisher. Sixteen of the best players from Canada, the USA, Mexico, and Europe were invited to participate. The inaugural event was won by Carles Rodon of Spain.

WAIT - Wizard Annual Invitational Tournament
Year	Location	Champion	Champion's nationality
2026	Welland, Ontario, Canada	Carles Rodon	Spain

== First hand probabilities ==
Since there are no options for which card to play when a player is only holding one card, there is a statistically correct bid for any given card. This only truly applies if a player has the lead, and thus no information from other bids. Since a correct bid of 1 yields 30 points, and a correct bid of 0 only yields 20, a bid of 1 over time yields more points as long as the player has at least a 42.86% chance of winning the trick.

The known cards are only a player's own card and the turn up, so with 58 unknowns, the odds that a hand will win in a three player game are calculated by the odds that both of the other hands lose to that player. That is, (x/58)*((x-1)/57), x=# of cards the player can beat. The calculation is similar for more players. Solving for x to yield 0.4286 or greater gives the minimum number of cards a player needs to be ahead of to justify a bid of 1.

With the lead:

- In a 3-person game, x=39, bid 1 with an offsuit Jack or stronger.
- In a 4-person game, x=44, bid 1 with the 3 of trump or stronger, (4 of trump if the turn up is the 2 or 3).
- In a 5-person game, x=49, bid 1 with the 9 of trump or better, (the 8 will do if the turn up is higher than the 8)
- In a 6-person game, x=50, bid 1 with the 10 of trump or better (9 if turn-up is 10 or higher)
- In the special case that a jester turns up and there is therefore no trump, and the player has the lead: always bid 1 in a 3 player game, With 4 - bid 1 on 3 or higher, with 5 - bid 1 with any 9 or higher, and with 6 players a 10 or higher.

== Reviews ==
- Games #110
- 1992 Games 100 in Games #112
- Games September 2010
- ToysBulletin.com
- Meople's Magazine
- There Will Be Games
- The Villages Daily Sun

== See also ==
- Oh hell
