= Dummy hand =

Hand dealt to an imaginary extra player

A dummy hand or dummy in card games is a special hand dealt to an imaginary extra player, and often played out according to certain rules. A dummy hand can take the place of a human player either as a dead hand (their cards are not used in the game), or under the control of another player. In some games the dummy is played face-up.

== Dead hand ==
A dead hand is a hand dealt face down, but not used in the game. Its cards are considered dead cards. The dummy does not participate in the game, is not revealed and does not score.

In Rummoli the dummy position is known as the widow. A dummy hand is dealt and those cards are not revealed until the end of the game. This is designed to keep some cards out of the game, making it more challenging to win difficult hands.

In some versions of Mahjong, including three player mahjong, the last 13 tiles from the wall are not used (as though it is an extra hand that is not played).

== Controlled hand ==
In other games the dummy hand is controlled by a selected player (effectively meaning that player plays two separate hands). The points earned in the dummy are not scored separately but go to the player who played it.

In certain scenarios of bridge and whist (most notably dummy whist), a dummy hand is won and controlled by the winner of an in-game auction.

== Bibliography ==
- Parlett, David (2008). The Penguin Book of Card Games. London: Penguin. ISBN 978-0-141-03787-5.
