= Spades (card game) =

Card game

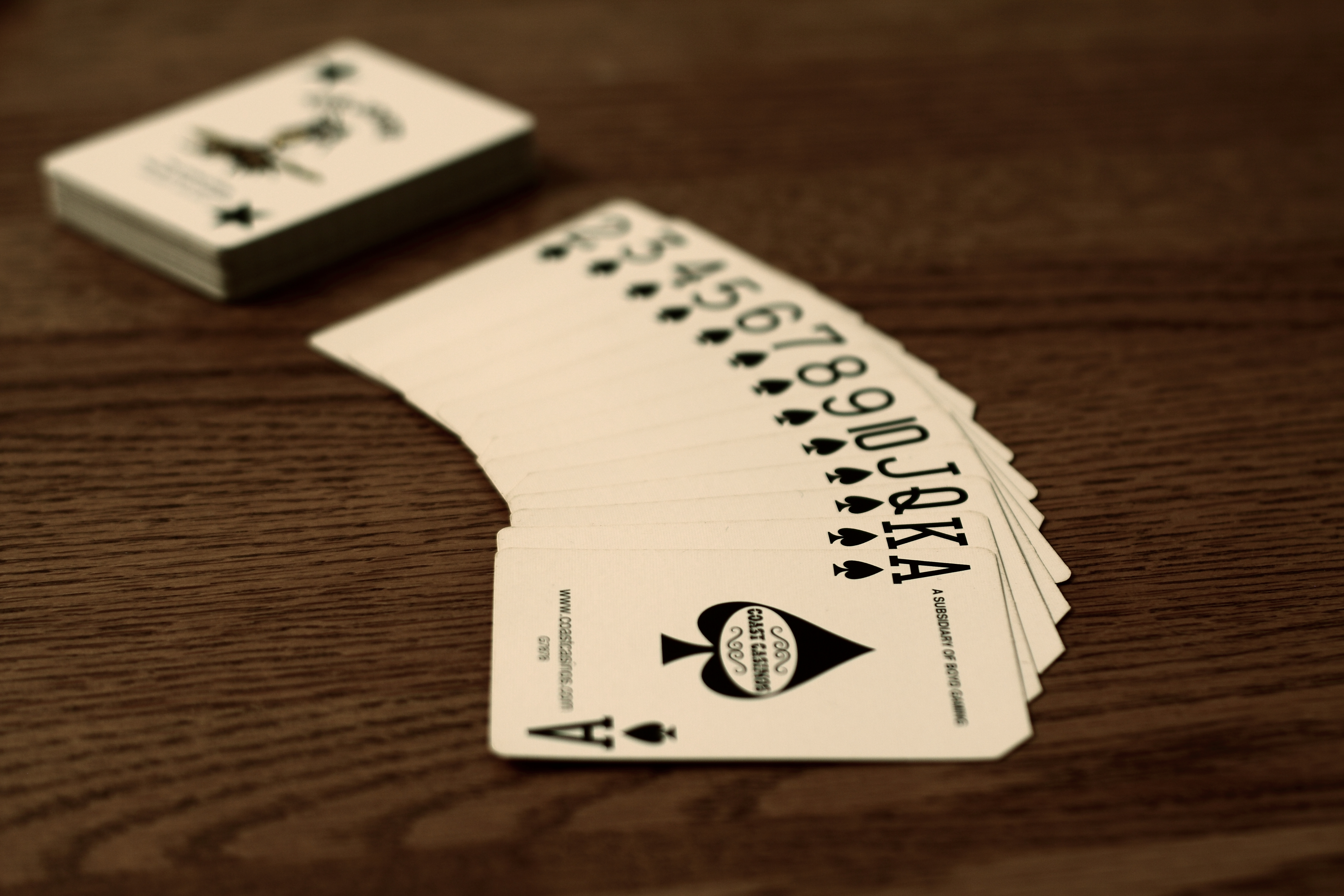
- Origin: United States
- Alternative names: Call Bridge, Call Break
- Type: Trick-taking
- Family: Auction Whist
- Players: 4 (standard) to 6
- Skills: Card counting, tactics
- Age range: All
- Cards: 52–54
- Deck: French
- Rank (high→low): A K Q J 10 9 8 7 6 5 4 3 2
- Play: Clockwise
- Playing time: 90 min.
- Chance: Moderate

Spades is a trick-taking card game devised in the United States in the 1930s. It can be played as either a partnership or solo/"cutthroat" game. The object is to take the number of tricks that were bid before play of the hand began. Spades is a descendant of the whist family of card games, which also includes bridge, hearts, and oh hell. Its major difference as compared to other whist variants is that, instead of trump being decided by the highest bidder or at random, the spade suit is always trumps, hence the name.

== History ==
Spades was devised in the Midwest of the United States in the late 1930s. Bridge author, George Coffin ascertained that it originated in Cincinnati between 1937 and 1939. The game is descended from Whist and is closely related to Bridge, Pinochle and Euchre. It appears like a simplification of contract bridge such that a skilled spades player can learn bridge relatively quickly, the major additional rules being dynamic trump, the auction, dummy play, and rubber scoring.

The game's rise to popularity in the U.S. came during World War II, when it was spread by soldiers traveling around the globe. The game's popularity in the armed forces stems from its simplicity compared to Bridge and Euchre and the fact that it can be more easily interrupted than Poker, all of which were also popular military card games. After the war, veterans brought the game back home to the U.S., where due to the GI Bill it spread to, and became popular among, college students as well as in-home games. It also remained widely popular in countries in which U.S. troops were stationed, both in WWII and later deployments.

== Overview ==
Number of players
Two or more. The game is most commonly played with four players in pairs, "partnership spades".

The deck
Standard 52-card deck. Spades may also be played with one or two Jokers or with predetermined cards removed. When playing with six or more players, a second deck is often used.

Rank of suit
Spades are always trump. Other suits have no intrinsic value during play, but a card of the suit led in the current trick will beat a card of any other suit, except a spade. If a tiebreaker is needed in a draw for deal, the most common suit order in Bridge from low to high is ♣ ♦ ♥ ♠.

Rank of cards
Highest to lowest: Ace, King, Queen, Jack, 10, 9, 8, 7, 6, 5, 4, 3, 2.

Object of the game
To score points, generally 500. Points are accrued by winning at least the number of tricks bid in each hand. They are lost by failing to take at least that many, or in some cases by taking too many.

Counter bidding
The first team that bids has an option to counter-bid their opponent.

== Rules ==
=== The deal ===
The first dealer is chosen by a draw for "first spade" or "highest card". Thereafter the deal passes to the dealer's left after each hand. The dealer shuffles, and the player to the right is given the opportunity to "cut" the cards to prevent the dealer stacking the deck. The entire deck is then dealt face-down one card at a time in clockwise order. With four players, each player should receive 13 cards. The players then pick up their cards, verify the correct count of the cards, and arrange them as desired. The most common arrangement is by suit, then rank.

A misdeal is a deal in which all players have not received the same number of cards, or a player has dealt out of turn. A misdeal may be discovered immediately by counting the cards after they are dealt, or it may be discovered during play of a hand. If a single card is misdealt and discovered before players in question have seen their cards, the player that is short a card can pull a card at random from the player with an extra card. Otherwise a hand is misdealt. The hand is considered void and the hand must be redealt by the same dealer, unless the reason for the redeal is the hand was dealt out of turn.

=== Bidding ===
Each player bids the number of tricks they expect to take. The player to the left of the dealer starts the bidding. Bidding continues in a clockwise direction, ending with the dealer. As spades are always trump, no trump suit is named during bidding (as with some other whist variants). A bid of "zero" is called "nil". Players must bid at least one if they don't want to bid "nil" (see below).

In partnership spades, the standard rule is that the bids by the two members of each partnership are added together.

==== Blind and nil bidding ====
Two very common variants of bidding are for a player or partnership to bid "blind", without having looked at their cards, or to bid "nil", stating that they will not take a single trick during play of the hand. These bids give the partnership a bonus if the players exactly meet their bid, but penalizes them if the players takes more or fewer.

A combined bid of two "blind nil" is usually allowed and is worth both the blind and nil bonuses or penalties. In some variants, the player bidding nil passes one or two of their cards (depending on the variant rules) to their partner and receives an equal number of cards back from said partner. Nil passing may be allowed only in the case of a blind nil. Usually teams must be down by 100 points to bid blind nil.

=== Game play ===
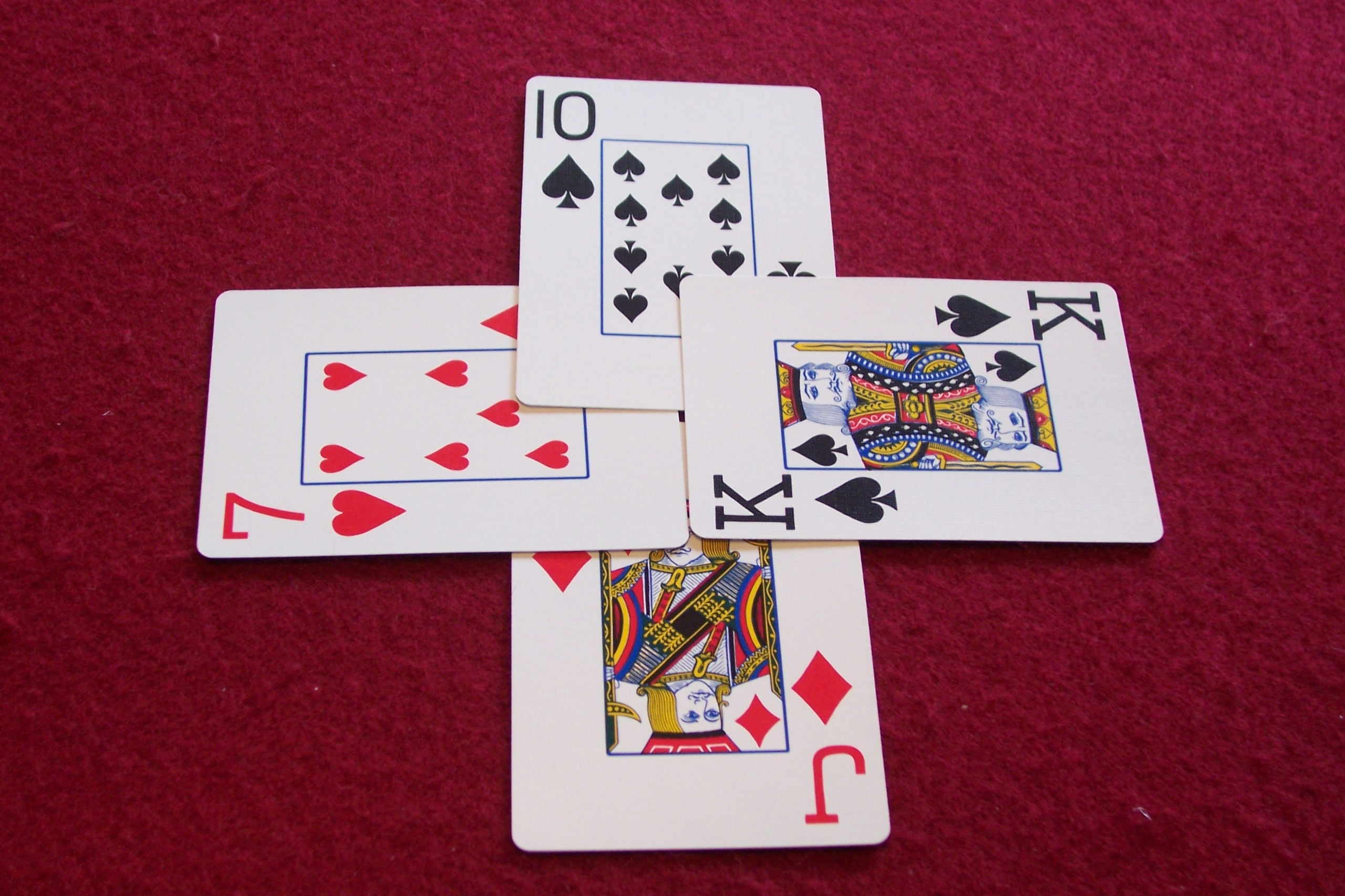
South leads J♦ and no one else can follow suit. West sloughs a heart, North attempts to trump with 10♠ and East takes the trick with K♠.

Each hand consists of a number of tricks. A four-handed game consists of thirteen tricks using all fifty-two cards. The player on the dealer's left makes the opening lead by playing a single card of their choice. Players in clockwise fashion then play cards of their choice. They must follow suit if possible. Otherwise they may play any card, including a trump spade.

Once a card has left the hand of a player, it stands and cannot be retrieved, unless the player who threw the card makes an effort to correct their mistake before the next player lays down a card.

A common variant rule, borrowed from Hearts, is that a player may not lead spades until a spade has been played to trump another trick. This prevents a player who is "long" in spades (having a large number of them) from leading spades one after the other at the beginning of the hand to deplete them and thus prevent other players using them as trumps. The act of playing the first spade in a hand is known as "breaking spades", derived from its parent rule, "breaking hearts". When a player leads with a spade after spades has been broken, the other players must follow suit.

Another common variant rule, also borrowed from Hearts, is that a player cannot lead spades in the first trick.

The trick is won or taken by the player who played the highest card of the led suit. If trumps were played, the highest trump card wins. The player who wins the trick gathers the cards up into a facedown arrangement that allows players to count the number of tricks taken. The contents of each trick can not be viewed after this point, except to determine whether a player reneged.

The number of tricks a player has won cannot be disguised. If asked, each player must count out their tricks until everyone has agreed on the "trick count". The player who wins any given trick, leads the next. Play continues until all players have exhausted their hands, which should occur on the same last trick. Otherwise, it is declared a misdeal.

==== Reneging ====
A partnership reneges on their contract if they violate the rules of play. Most often this happens when a player plays offsuit when they could have—and therefore should have—followed suit. This may not be noticed until later in the game.

Common penalties for reneging are for the reneging player to automatically lose their bid, or for the reneger to have three tricks added to their bid as a penalty, meaning that the team may still make contract but must take three additional tricks to do so. It does not matter whether the player reneged on purpose.

=== Scoring ===
Once the final trick is played, the hand is then scored. Many variants for scoring exist. What follows is the basic method.

==== Contract score ====
Once a hand is completed, the players count the number of tricks they took and, in the case of partnerships or teams, the members' trick counts are summed to form a team count.

Each player's or team's trick count is then compared to their contract. If the player or team made at least the number of tricks bid, 10 points for each bid trick are awarded. A bid of 5 would earn 50 points if made. If a team did not make its contract, it was "set" and 10 points for each bid trick are deducted from the team's score. E.g.: six bid and any number less than six taken, results in minus 60 points.

If a player/team took more tricks than they bid, a single point is scored for each overtrick, called an "overtrick", "bag", or "sandbag". A bid of 5 tricks with 6 tricks taken, results in a score of 51 points.

==== Bonuses or penalties ====
To this contract score, players add bonuses earned and subtract penalties assessed based on whether the player successfully did or failed to do any of the more specific things they said they would in the bidding phase. Many variants exist that award or penalize according to certain behaviors. They are covered below. For the basic nil and blind bids, points are awarded as follows:

Bid made	If bid met exactly	If player took more
Nil	100	−100
Blind nil	200	−200
Double nil	400 or game	0 or −200
Double blind nil	800 or game	0 or −400

Though some variant bonuses or penalties are based on the contract score, normally a bonus or penalty does not affect and is not affected by any other bonus or penalty, or the contract score. As a result, a partnership can have a net positive score even if they failed to make their contract. For instance, if one player successfully made a nil bid, but their partner bid 5 tricks and only took 4 tricks, the partnership still gets the bonus which is represented as −50 points + 100 points = 50 points.

Conversely, a partnership can have a net negative score in much the same way. If a player failed a nil bid but the partnership bid and took 5 tricks, the net score is −50 points.

If a nil bid is set, most tournament rules dictate that the overtricks make the nil invalid.

==== Sandbags and bagging out ====
A common scoring variant is designed to penalize players for underestimating the number of tricks they will take, while at the same time not removing the possible strategy of intentionally taking overtricks, or "bags", in order to "set" the other team. This is accomplished by keeping track of bags in the ones place on the scorecard, and assessing a 100-point penalty when 10 bags are accumulated and the ones place rolls over. In shorter variants of the game, where players play to 250 points, instead of the standard 500 points, sandbag penalties can be assessed earlier. In these variants, a 50-point penalty would be assessed when 5 bags are accumulated.

For example, if a team's bid is 5 tricks and they take 8 tricks, the score for the hand is 53 points. If the team's total score before this hand had a digit in the ones place of 7 or more, for instance 108, the team has "bagged out" or been "sandbagged". The hand's score is added to the total and then 100 points are deducted. In the example, the score would be 61 points after the penalty.

The 10 bags could be considered to make the penalty 90 points. The penalty can instead be 110 points to offset this, or the ones' place can simply not be carried when adding. Anything over 10 sandbags is retained in the first digit and count towards future overtricks. A player or team can bag out multiple times in a game. Sandbags do not count as points.

==== Keeping score ====
One of the players is the scorer and writes the bids down, so that during the play and for the scoring afterward, this information will be available to all the players. When a hand is over, the scores should be recorded next to the bids. Alternatively, the scorer can turn the bid into the contract score by writing in the number of bags (zero if there were none) behind the bid, and a minus sign before it if the team was set, then add bonuses and subtract penalties beneath. A running score should be kept so that players can readily see each other's total points.

=== Winning ===
The most common condition is the first to reach 500 points, or forcing the opposing team to drop to −200 points. Alternatively, the game could be played for a fixed number of hands or a fixed time limit. With four players, eight hands can generally be played in about an hour. If there is a tie, then all players participate in one more round of play until a winner is decided.

== Game variations ==
As with any widely played game of such a flexible nature, spades has many variations, ranging from significant changes in play to small tweaks that suit individual or household preference.

=== Deal variations ===
Deficient hand
Sometimes a misdeal is also called if a player is dealt a "deficient" hand, such as one that contains one or no spades or no face cards (players should agree beforehand on what constitutes a "deficient hand"). A player wishing to declare a misdeal due to a deficient hand must throw down their hand face-up, so other players may verify, and must declare "misdeal" before any member of their team has bid. Declaring a misdeal on a deficient hand is optional; a player may try to bid "nil" if dealt such a hand.

Deuce starts
Regardless of which player has dealt, the player with the 2♣ leads it to begin the game, similar to hearts.

Face-up deal
In this variant, the dealer can lay out up to four cards per player face up as long as the same number is revealed for each player. Revealing the cards can also set up the psychological warfare of bidding and later playing, referred to as power checks, but face-up deals are sometimes done by dealers who set the deck to determine if the cut has disrupted their preparations. When a face-up deal is made, Blind Nil can still be bid if the player has not viewed any face-down cards.

Kitty
In games with players where the cards cannot be dealt evenly, there is a variation in which no cards are removed from the deck, but instead a kitty composed of the leftover cards (or one trick's worth of cards plus the leftovers) is placed at center. Whoever is dealt the 2♣, or alternatively, the player with the highest bid (tie-breaker being first to make that bid), picks up the kitty before bidding begins, integrates it into their hand and then discards the same number of cards. If a round of cards in addition to the leftovers is placed in the kitty, the discard by the player who picked up the kitty counts as a trick. This introduces more uncertainty in bids because usually the person with the kitty tries to void one suit and trump earlier in the game.

=== Bidding variations ===
Sum of bids
One variant, borrowed from the related game oh hell, is that the sum of all bids must not equal the number of tricks to be played. This ensures that at least one player or team will be set or "bagged" (forced to take an overtrick). Another game variation allows each player to optionally increase their bid by one point after all players have bid but before game play starts. A reduction in bid, once bids are made, is never allowed.

Nil
A player that has already looked at their cards can bid nil. The object of the bidder is to take no tricks during the hand. The player's partner may make a normal bid and then help them by attempting to take tricks the Nil bidder would otherwise take. In solo/cutthroat spades, successful Nil bids are rare since there is no partner to help by taking the bidder's higher cards. If the Nil bidder takes no tricks, that player receive the Nil bonus; if unsuccessful, the player or team subtracts that bonus. More than one player (opponents or teammates in partners) may bid Nil on a deal.

Double nil
Both players in a partnership bid nil and if successful, the team's nil bonuses are doubled. If either player or both players fail(s) to make theirs nil bid, there is no penalty.

Blind bidding
Virtually all games include a variant that may happen during bidding; one or more players, having not yet looked at their cards, may choose to bid on the number of tricks they will take. When bidding "blind", the player's bid, if made exactly by that player, is rewarded with bonus points, while failing to make the bid results in the bonus being subtracted from the player's or team's score. Blind bidding is capped at a bid of seven. Thus, bidding a blind 8 or higher is contrary to standard game play, and is not allowed. Quite commonly, blind bids are allowed only if the bidding team is at least 100 points behind, and in many cases, whether a minimum point spread is required, these risky bids are typically made by a team with a large deficit as a last-ditch effort; blind bids made in this situation are typically called "trailing blind bids".

Blind nil
The most common blind bid, the player bids that they will not take a single trick during play of the hand. Bidding nil offers an additional bonus on top of the blind bid. A failed nil bid, similar to a failed blind, results in the bonus being deducted from the score.

Double blind nil
It is possible for both players of a partnership to bid blind nil. If this is done successfully, the team wins the game outright or takes double the combined bonus. If either or both players take tricks, however, there is no penalty.

Passing
Passing, or the exchanging of cards between players, is optional and rare in spades. However, one more common exception relates to nil bids, which are generally considered difficult to make, especially when the bid was blindly made. To offset this difficulty slightly, a partnership in which one player has bid nil or blind nil can choose to pass two cards between players; the most common arrangement is one card for regular nil and two cards for blind nil. When passing, the partners agree on a number of cards to pass, then select that number of cards and place them face down in front of their partner. Neither partner should look at the cards passed to them before they have passed their own cards. In passing this way, the idea is for the partner who bid nil to offload their highest trumps or other face cards in return for low cards from their partner, which both decreases the likelihood that the nil bidder can be forced to take a trick, and increases the likelihood that their partner will be able to "cover", or overplay high cards the nil bidder still holds that would otherwise take a trick. The number of cards passed should be determined before the game begins so that each team can use this as they bid.

Passing does not have to be limited to this one case; players may agree that a certain number of cards may, or must, be passed either between partners or to the opponent on each player's left or right, before or after making a bid. Passing between opponents is borrowed from hearts and generally allows players to attempt to "shorten" or "void" a suit, or get rid of "dangerous" cards such as upper pip cards or low face cards, which may win a trick the player didn't bid to take. Passing between partners in situations other than nil bids is rare, as the players would have little or no information about cards their partner would want or that opponents wouldn't.

Board
Each team is required to make a minimum required bid of four tricks. When bidding nil, the player's teammates must bid a minimum of four tricks or bid double nil or triple nil with three teammates. When playing solo, one can bid nil or board. You can never bid anything between nil or board. A variation to this play involves setting the minimum bid to whatever number the players agree on.

Partnership bidding
This variant allows partners to "talk" during the bidding round and bid as a partnership rather than individuals. The partnership that did not deal makes their bid first, and the opposing partnership may use this information to craft their bid, although the total number of tricks bid by both teams does not need to equal 13. The minimum bid is "Board" or 4 tricks, and there is no nil bidding. Players are allowed to discuss how many tricks they think they can take with each other, but any discussion that identifies specific cards or strength of a particular suit constitutes "cross-boarding" and results in a misdeal, for which the penalty can range from the deal passing to the left to adding a predetermined number of "bags" to the offending partnership to a score penalty of up to 100 points.

The only exception to this rule is the ace check rule. If a player holds three or more aces in their hand, that player may use the phrase ace check during the bidding round. The partner then discloses whether or not they have an Ace. If the initiating partner can now determine that all four aces are held within the partnership, they may pass a card face down to their partner. Doing so creates a special contract where if the partnership retains all 4 aces after all cards are played for the hand, they receive a 100-point bonus. If not, they receive a 100-point penalty. The ace check variant is optional to partnership bidding, and is generally only used in combination with "deuces high" or similar trump variants where the ace of spades is more difficult to retain since other cards in the deck are assigned a higher rank.

Auction spades
This variant is a combination of spades with the auction-based bidding of Contract Bridge. Each player must bid a minimum of 1 trick; by making the bid, they are committing their partnership to take the minimum 6 tricks plus the number bid. Subsequent bidders must raise the bid or pass; once they pass, they cannot bid further. Once all other players have passed, the winning partnership (declarers) must take a number of tricks equal to the winning bid plus 6 (so a winning bid of 2 commits the declarers to winning 8 tricks), while the defenders attempt to set them. If the declarers make contract, they get 10 points per bid trick; if they are set they get nothing. The defenders get 10 points per overtrick made by, or undertrick missed by, the declarers (if the declarers bid 2 and only make 6 tricks, the declarers get nothing and defenders get 20 points; if the declarers make 10 tricks, the declarers get 80 points but the defenders get 20 for the 2 unbid overtricks). Thus, the defenders have a choice of tactics; they can either set the declarers so they get no points, or may "bag" the declarers by forcing them to take overtricks so both sides get points.

No-trump bids
This variant's name is misleading as it is not the same as the equivalent bid in contract bridge; spades are still trumps, but a player who bids some number of tricks with "no trump" promises not to win any tricks with spades, except when spades are led. A player may only bid "no trump" if that player holds at least one spade in their hand, and their partner agrees to let them bid NT. A player who successfully makes a no trump bid counts each trick taken by that player as double (normally 20 points).

10-for-200
Also known as bidding a flight or wheels. Bidding 10-for-200 commits a side to win at least 10 tricks; if successful, the team scores 200 points. If the side wins fewer than 10 tricks, they lose 200 points. Some play a lost bid only loses 100, not 200. In some variations, to make a 10-for-200 bid, the side must win exactly 10 tricks. If a team pulls more than 10 the extra tricks are still bags or "ob's" Some play that any bid of 10 is automatically a 10-for-200 bid. In some places the 10-for-200 bid is called 10-for-2, which is written on the score sheet as 10-4-2. Another way of writing the 200 score is with the two zeros linked together at the top; this is called wheels, as the zeroes are supposed to look like train wheels. Making this bid is also significant in that the other team is automatically set if Nils are not allowed, since they would not even make board, thus the winning team will be ahead by at least 240 points (200 for the score + 40 point penalty of the other team).

Eight & ten rule
Variation of bonus where bonuses are split into two between 4 players (8 + 3 and 10 + 3). This variation is played widely in India and England.

Big & Little Moe
A series of bids where the partnership states their intention to take, respectively, eight or six tricks consecutively. Any capture of a trick by opponents "resets" the count. A partnership bidding Big Moe and capturing eight tricks in a row gains 300 points; one bidding Little Moe and capturing six tricks in a row gains 150 points. Bags or overtricks, if applicable, are not counted.

Bemo
A specialization of Big & Little Moe bidding, bidding Little Bemo commits the team to win all of the first six tricks. It is additional to the normal bid; the team scores an extra bonus of 60 if successful and loses 60 if not. Big Bemo similarly commits the team that bids it to win the first nine tricks; they score a 90-point bonus if successful and lose 90 if not.

Blind 6
This must be declared by a side before either partner looks at their cards. It scores 120 points if the side takes exactly six tricks. If they take some other number of tricks they lose 120. It is also commonly played that the side must win at least six tricks and overtricks are not counted, or that failing to make six tricks only loses 60.

Trailing blind bids
Only a player or partnership that is 100 points behind the leader may make blind bids of any kind, and they are scored at 20 points per bid trick, with no overtricks scored. Failing a blind contract is penalized at the normal 10 points per trick bid. Played with or without jokers.

No nines, no blinds
A variation of partnership bidding – neither blind bids nor a cumulative bid of 9 is allowed. This can make the game more competitive since a partnership with a strong hand has to either bid an 8 or 10-for-200, risking "overbidding" their hand and teams cannot catch up through trailing blind bids.

Boston
Also known as shooting the moon or slamming. Related to but opposite of a double nil bid. If a team bids to take all the tricks in a hand and does so, that team wins the game outright regardless of the score before the hand. A team cannot bid to shoot the moon if the other team bids double nil, and vice versa.

Blind moon
This is a blind bid to take all tricks in a hand, made before either partner has looked at their cards. Again, the first team to bid either double blind nil or blind moon has precedence.

Lexington
Similar to Boston but 12 tricks are made. Variations include automatically scoring 240 points regardless the bid.

Half tricks
In this variation, the first partner of a team to bid may optionally bid tricks in increment of one-half instead of one, i.e. "I bid three-and-one-half". Their partner is then required to bid such that the team bid rounds out to a whole number, i.e. "I'll bid two-and-one-half" for a team bid of six tricks. This gives some information between partners; a player is bidding that they will take three tricks and might take a fourth. Their partner can then use this in determining the other half of the partnership's bid.

Suicide
Played by four players, playing as partners. Each player must bid either nil or at least four tricks. The second player to bid in each partnership may either bid the opposite, i.e., Nil if partner bid four or more, or may bid what their partner bid, thus forcing their partner to take the opposite bid.

Another version of suicide is played by four players, playing as partners. The bidding is the same as normal, except that one person in each team is forced to bid nil, so if the leading partner does not bid nil they must do so. This limits the hands which the first and second person want to bid a non-nil amount, as if they do not have the ace of spades, they cannot place it and therefore risk having it in their partner's hand.

Whiz
In this variant, each player must bid the exact number of spades in their hand or go nil. There is no minimum amount for teams to bid. Blind bidding is not allowed, however bags are counted as usual.

Mirrors
Related to whiz, each player must bid the number of spades in their hand. Players do not have the option to go nil unless they have no spades and must bid nil if this is the case. Bags are counted as normal.

Fredieu
In this variant, each player must bid a minimum four tricks unless going nil, blind nil or wheels (10 for 200). The objective is to force as many bags as possible on the opposing players to give them the most sandbags. Sandbags are counted as usual.

=== Trump variations ===
Breaking Spades
Borrowed from hearts, a player may not lead a spade until a spade has been played as a trump card (when a non-Spade was led), unless they have only Spades.

Deuces high
All 2s count as the highest spades. The order becomes, highest to lowest: 2♠, 2♦, 2♣, 2♥, then all the rest of the spades, Ace through 3. There is another variation, when playing with the Jokers, that the 2♠ and the 2♦ are high trumps, then Ace, King, etc. When the deck being used does not contain Jokers, or contains Jokers of the same size, the 2♥ becomes the big joker and the 2♣ becomes the little joker. There is a variation where the Aces can be called high (value of 14) or low (value of 1). In this scenario highest to lowest spades with all cards in deck is: big joker, little joker, 2♠, 2♦, 2♣, 2♥, ace, king – 3 of spades.

Joke trumps
Jokers have no value or rank by themselves, but transform all teammates' cards (whether played before or after the Joker) played in the same trick to "joke trumps" status. For example, a Joker played on A♥ transforms that card into A♠, which trumps all cards except a natural A♠. Similarly, a Joker followed by a 5♦ transforms the latter into a 5♠, beatable by either a natural 5♠ or higher, or a joke 6♠ or higher. There is no added benefit to playing multiple Jokers. If two teams play Jokers, resulting in tied joke trumps, the tie is broken either by the higher Joker, the first Joker played, or the suit rank (♦ first, then ♣, then ♥), depending on variation.

Jokers high aka easy spades
Both jokers are positioned as the highest spades. So instead of just 13 spades, there are now 15 spades. This in effect takes the queens out of question, meaning one need not bother to question whether the queen will win a trick, it will most likely not. With more spades and removing the question from the queens makes this variation an easier game to play. If both jokers are played in one trick, the big joker (full color, red, or larger graphic) beats the little joker (black-and-white, or the "guarantee" card with smaller art). A related variation is Joker-Joker-Deuce-Ace in which the ranking is big joker, little joker, 2♠ and A♠. With 3 players, the Jokers are added and no cards are removed; with 4 players, the 2♣ and either 2♥ or 2♦ are taken out, or, similar to their use in Euchre, can replace the J♠ and J♣.

Jokers high alternate
Similar to jokers high above, if the big joker is led, opponents must play their highest spade in that trick. If the big joker is played during a hand, opponents are not forced to play their highest spade. This variation makes bidding more complex, as one cannot count on their highest spade as winning a trick, big joker excepted. This variation is commonly played with all 54 cards, using the Kitty dealing variation above.

Jokers high first played wins
Both jokers are used and count as the highest spade. If both jokers are played in one trick, the one played first takes the trick.

Bauer trumps
Adapted from 500 and Euchre, highest trump is the J♠, known as the right bauer. Second highest trump is J♣, being the same color and known as the Left Bauer. The rest of the cards follow normal order. Alternatively, and similar to the above, both Jacks can be replaced with two Jokers, making them more distinctive.

Differentiated trump values
Suits are given special trump value, with Spades being the highest trump. General order is ♠, ♣, ♦, and ♥. When played this way, there is no off-suit; the suit is either more or less valuable than the led suit, and if more valuable it trumps any card played in that suit.

Show 7 trump
If a player holds seven cards (or more) of a non trump suit, (Seven ♥, seven ♦, or seven ♣) The player may show their seven cards to the other players before bidding to change the trump suit from spades to the new suit. Thereby spades would cease to trump the other cards & the new suit would beat all other cards. In the case that seven cards (or more) of a suit are held by one player and seven ♠ (or more) are held by another player, The player holding the seven ♠ may optionally show their spades & make ♠ trump again. Bidding then begins as normal.

=== Variations ===
Aces high/low
During the play, aces can be called high or low. These are especially valuable cards in 3B-spades scoring version where there is an immediate penalty for taking extra tricks.

Big Mo, Little Mo
During bidding, a team may declare either Big Mo or Little Mo, meaning they intend to take the first several tricks. This is the only time that cross-talk during the bidding is allowed. A player considering a Mo may ask their teammate "How many do you have on the Mo?" or some similar question to determine how many tricks the teammate can contribute to the Mo without revealing any details as to which tricks they'll take. The only detail that can be discussed is which teammate will be leading the first trick but not how they will be leading. If a team declares Little Mo, they must take the first 7 tricks of the hand. Accomplishing the Little Mo earns the team 150 points. If a team declares Big Mo, they must take the first 10 tricks of the hand. Accomplishing the Big Mo earns the team 250 points. Taking more consecutive tricks than needed does not earn the team more points. For instance, taking the first 10 tricks when a Little Mo had been declared still only earns the team 150 points. The team that declares either Mo is immune to bags for that hand and will lead the first trick, regardless of whose turn it was to lead. Failure to accomplish the declared Mo (the opposing team took a trick before the goal was met) will cause the team to lose the points they would have earned had they been successful. This is true regardless of how many tricks they took before or after the opposing team took a trick. The other team bids and must match their bid, as usual. It's not unusual for a team that could do a Big Mo to declare a Little Mo to play it safe and then take the extra tricks to try to set their opponents.

Cancellation spades
3 teams of 2 players play with 2 decks minus both 2♥. The 2♦ is the highest spade followed by the 2♣ and A♠. They must follow the spades suit rules. If identical cards are played in a round, they cancel and cannot take the trick. Tricks won by no one are "dead" and discarded. Successful nil bids score 50. Double nil scores 200. No blind bid bonuses. Missed bids cost 10 points for each trick short—getting 3 of 5 means −20 points. Tricks taken by a nil do not count towards a non-nil bid and are penalized 10 points each. Extra tricks get 1 point—no penalties for sandbags. Game is six hands with each player dealing once. Optionally, 8 players can share two full decks with nils worth 30 and double nils worth 100.

Passing cards
Each team passes one card with their partner each hand. This rule is normally applied only to Nil bids and it is most frequently used to allow players to exchange two cards if a Blind Nil bid is made.

First trick clubs
This rule is borrowed from a common variation of hearts rules. Whoever possesses the lowest club, usually 2♣, 3♣ (if deuces are high), must open the play. Other players can play any card except spades on the first trick, unless the player has nothing but spades (rare, as the player would have to have been dealt every spade in the deck).

First trick lowest club
This rule is an elaboration of the preceding first trick clubs rule. Whoever possesses the lowest club, usually 2♣, 3♣ (if a three-hand game), must open the play. Each player must then play their lowest club to the first trick. Play proceeds normally from the second trick.

Speed-spades a.k.a. Philadelphia a.k.a. Quakers
The players agree to play each trick within a certain time frame, with each player required to make a play on a one- or two- second count. This is a game of pressure designed to induce mistakes, to increase the pace of a slow game, or both. Often the players will shout "speed spades!" as the start of each trick.

Play to beat a.k.a. must trump
A pinochle-based variant, if a player cannot follow suit, but can beat a spade already played as trump (when a spade was not led), they must play the "overtrump". Sometimes this rule extends this to even having to beat a player's partner, but this generally only applies to beating the other team's trump. If a player is caught breaking this rule, all points won by the team that broke the rule during the round are awarded to the opposing team. An alternate variant, from tarot games, is that if a player cannot follow suit, they must trump if they are able (meaning they cannot play off-suit if they have a spade even if there are no other spades played), and additionally they must beat any Spade already played if they can (including when spades are led).

End winning streak
If one player wins last three tricks of the round, it is worth either 3 points or 30. Some varieties include awarding points for winning the last four or five tricks with same point gauge. If this rule is enforced, and an opposing team ends a possible streak by taking the last trick, the points may be awarded to that team instead of the team who had the streak.

Dix
If the 9♠ wins a trick, it is worth 1 point. If the 9 wins a trick with at least one other spade in play, worth 5 points. If the 9 wins a spade-led trick, it is worth 10 points. This is borrowed from Pinochle where in the melding phase, a 9 of trumps is worth 10 points.

Last trick ace victory
Bonus points (1 or 10) are awarded for winning the last round with any ace. 20 points for winning with the ace of spades.

Last trick ace on nil
Bonus points, usually one-fifth of agreed nil value, are awarded for making a nil bid and playing an ace on the last trick.

Last trick deuce victory
Bonus points (30) are awarded for winning the last round with a non-trump two.

Last trick high spade victory
A player who takes the very last trick with a high spade (9♠ or above), and with that trick exactly makes their bid, receives a 10-point bonus. There is no bonus if the player bags or is short.

Nil
A team that declares nil is intending to lose every trick. If successful, the team earns 100 points. If the team takes a single trick, they will lose 100 points. A team that declares nil is immune to bags for that hand.

Blind nil
A team may declare blind nil as long as neither teammate has looked at any of their cards. After bidding has been set, all players can look at their cards like normal. Like nil, the team intends to lose every trick. If successful, the team earns 150 points. If the team takes a single trick, they will lose 150 points. A team that declares blind nil is immune to bags for that hand.

Nil in the dark
A player who bids nil in the dark shuffles their cards and puts them face down in front of them in a stack. When it is their play, they take the top card and throw it into the pile. The scoring counts the same as blind nil. A player may also go blind nil in the dark where they never even look at their cards. This is scored the same as a Big Mo. Nil in the dark is usually only bid if they have no trump cards.

The rest are mine (TRAM)
Some players allow a player who realizes that they cannot help but win all remaining tricks to simply lay down their hand and declare "the rest are mine"; such declaration is sometimes called "tramming". This can help speed the play of the game. An obvious situation in which a player could "TRAM" is if, with three tricks left to play, the leading player holds the A♠ K♠ Q♠. No matter which card they play, no other player will be able to beat that card (as the player holds the only cards that can), and the same will be true for the next two tricks. Usually, situations in which TRAMming is appropriate are less clearcut, and involve keeping track of the cards that have been played to determine whether any player could beat a particular card.
The practice is sometimes prohibited explicitly by the rules.
A player who mistakenly TRAMs (i.e., when it is possible for another player to win at least one trick) may face a penalty. This may be the same penalty as that imposed for any other illegal showing of cards, such as being required to leave the exposed cards face up on the table, to be played at the earliest legal opportunity to do so. Other penalties are also possible; e.g., forfeiting all remaining tricks at the discretion of the player who would otherwise take the trick (to prevent intentional false TRAMming that would give the player an advantage), or forfeiting of a player's bid and scoring the hand as if that player had failed to make their bid, regardless of the number of tricks they have taken.

=== Scoring variations ===
3B-spades
In 3B-spades there is an immediate bag penalty. In this variation you are penalized minus 10 for each extra trick. In this case the player receives 10 points for each trick that was bid and minus 10 points for each extra trick. This makes the ideal strategy to make your own bid exactly while giving extra tricks to some players and trying to set others. A person going zero/nil also gets minus 10 for each "extra" trick and those points go into the "zero pot". Players that did not make their bid only get 1 point per trick made.

No overs
One game variation does not count overtricks. In this case the player or team receives only 10 points for each trick that was bid and no points for overtricks. This changes the bidding strategy; it is only possible to lose points by being "set" on a bid, as there is no penalty for "bagging out", so players will attempt to "set" the leading player or team in order to gain ground. Similarly, players or teams will bid lower to avoid being set as there is no penalty for taking too many overtricks.

Double over, double back
Instead of, or perhaps in addition to, penalizing players who "bag out", a common variant is for players or teams who take at least double the number of bid tricks will be penalized by subtracting double the value of their contract. A team who bids 2 tricks and takes 4 tricks or more will lose 40 points. This is often combined with the "no overs" scoring style to discourage small bids.

Oh hell variation
Like oh hell, partnerships must take exactly the number of tricks bid. If they have overtricks, the team is penalized and the contract is broken. Some play where if the team bids 5 tricks and wins exactly 5 tricks, the contract is honored no matter which player made how many tricks, while others force each player to exactly meet their contract.

Quicksand
A variation of penalizing overtricks, a team who exactly makes their contract gets full value. Overtricks subtract 10 points each from that value, and teams who do not make their contract subtract 10 points for each missed trick. For instance, consider a bid of 7 tricks. If the team made exactly 7 tricks, they would earn the full 70 points. If they only took 5 tricks, they would lose 20 points. If the team made 9 tricks, they would earn the 70 points, −20 points for the two overtricks, resulting in a score of 50 points.

Broken contract gives points to opposing team
This is an additional variant taken from bridge and used with an auction-style bidding. If the declarer (the player or partner with the winning bid) fails to meet the contract, the defending pair receives 10 points for each undertrick (the number of tricks by which declarer fell short of the goal). Instead of the declaring team losing points, they should receive zero.

Books made
If the combine bids of both teams equals 10 books (i.e. 6 books to 4 books, 5 books to 5 books) then books made is called. The hand is not played out. Both team are awarded their bids. There are no over books. the deal moves to the next player.

Deficient ends the game
If one team's cumulative score is less than the negative of the winning score, that team has lost. For example, if before the game, the winning score is set at 500 points, then either team that manages to net a score of −500 points or below automatically loses.

Highlander scoring
The points awarded function slightly differently than in conventional spades. Highlander scoring merges partnership playing with individual team effort. Sandbagging does not apply with this type of game play, although sandbagging could be included. Each partner makes a bid of the tricks they think they can win. Each partner must win the total they individually bid; if not, that player's bid value is deducted from the team's score even if their partner took enough trick to make up the difference.
For example, if Tom bids 5 tricks and wins 4 tricks, and Harry (his partner) bids 3 tricks and wins 4 tricks, 80 points is deducted from the partnership's total score even though the team won their promised 8 tricks, because Tom did not make his bid. However, Harry is awarded five points per overtrick, so they are −75 points instead of −80 points. If the contract is broken and no overtricks were taken, the team is down the full amount of the bid. If both made their contract and have won overtricks, they are awarded five extra points per overtrick. Team that wins seven or more tricks per round is given 10 points the first time, 20 points the second, and each time thereafter the points increase by 10. This encourages race-style play where players set out to take as many tricks as they can as long as they do not steal tricks their partner needs.

Individual team players
If both teammates get their exact individual bid, they are given a bonus equal to half the total bid (rounded down to the nearest 10 to avoid interference with bags). For example, Tom bids 3 tricks, Harry bids 4 tricks. If Tom wins 3 tricks and Harry wins 4 tricks, 30 bonus points are awarded to that team (added to the 70 points for contract for a total of 100 points on the hand).

Sandbags 0-till-10
Some players use the last digit of the score to count sandbags, but do not regard that digit as being part of the score. For example, as score of 54 points translates to 50 recordable points with 4 sandbags. In this manner, sandbags are in effect worth nothing until a player accumulates 10 of them, at which point they trigger a 100-point deduction. Bags are thus kept separate from the score and cannot be used as a tiebreaker.

Sandbag cancellation
Some people play that there is a special card which cancels one bag on that hand for the side that takes it in their tricks. If the side which wins the special card makes no overtricks, or loses their bid, the special card has no effect. The special card may be either a fixed card or may be determined afresh by cutting a card before each deal.

Sandbags negative value
Tricks in excess of the contract (overtricks or sandbags) may be worth −1 point each rather than +1 point. In this case the penalty for accumulating 10 overtricks generally does not apply.

Seven tricks or higher
For successful bids of seven or more, players get an extra 10 points for each trick bid above six. So, if 7 tricks are bid by a player and that contract is made exactly, 80 bonus points are awarded. 8 tricks award 100 points, 9 tricks award 120 points, etc. This method of scoring rewards players who are more daring.

Seven tricks or higher part deux
Team that bids and then wins 7 tricks per round is given 10 points the first time, 20 points the second, and each time thereafter the points increase by 10 points. Overtricks do not count.

Win the last trick
Taken from bela and pinochle, the winner of last trick wins 10 bonus points. Generally this variation is not recommended if one is playing with bonus tricks.

Leading with the ace of spades
Depending on the region in which the game is played this is permitted.

No point deductions
In some variations of spades, no points are lost when bids are not met. In these scenarios, the team receives a score of 0 points for the round. This scoring is less drastic than normal scoring and is recommended for beginner players. Nil is the exception to this rule. If a player bids nil and takes a trick, then 100 points are deducted from the team's score. This is independent of your partner's bid. For example, if a player bids nil and their team member does not meet their bid, the team still gains a net of 100 points. If a player bids nil and receives a trick, then 100 points are deduced and their partner's hand is scored normally.

=== The number of players ===
Traditionally spades is played with four players in two partnerships. However, there are variations that allow for greater or fewer players. Partnerships are optional even with four players. All other rules should be agreed upon beforehand by the players.

Solo spades
Solo spades is like regular spades, just without the partnership. This is also known as "cutthroat spades".

Two players
In this variation, the cards are not dealt at the beginning of the game. Instead, the deck is placed face down and the players take turns drawing two cards with each turn. Once drawn, players must choose one card of the pair to discard and one to keep. This continues until the deck is exhausted after which, each player will possess 13 cards. The game then proceeds normally. :A variation of this deal is to decide whether or not to keep the first card drawn. If the player decides to keep the first card, the second card may be looked at, but must be discarded. If the player decides to discard the first card, the second card must be kept. This variation introduces a greater degree of chance into the game. To add an even greater degree of chance, forbid viewing of the second card if the first card is kept. This gives both players less certainty as to which cards their opponent is holding.

Three players
There are no partnerships; players play for themselves. A standard 52 card deck is used, and each player is dealt 17 cards with a predetermined card thrown out (usually the 2♣) or the last undealt card thrown out. Some play with the Big and little joker included as the highest trumps, with each person getting 18 cards.

Five players
There are no partnerships; players play for themselves. 2♦ and 2♥ are removed from the deck and each player is dealt 10 cards. Alternatively, if three Jokers are available, they may be added as either highest trump or as junk cards, thus dealing each player 11 cards each.

Six players
This can be played either solo, three partnerships, or two teams of three. Two standard 52 card decks are combined, with both 2♣ discarded (102 cards, 17 each), two cards discarded (or kept as a kitty), or all four Jokers added (108 cards, 18 each). Prior to the beginning of play, players agree on the protocol when identical cards are played. Some play that the first such played card wins the trick while others play that the last played card wins the trick. Alternatively, 6-handed play can be done with a 48 card deck, having removed all the 2s. It can also be done with a 52 card deck plus two Jokers, similar to three-handed but with half the cards per player.

Seven or more players
Beyond six players, the game becomes either very complex, or hard to maintain with multiple decks. An additional side effect of an increased number of players is a short game, as the number of cards held by each player is reduced and high trump is more and more likely to take the trick. Seven players should normally be split into groups of four and three, eight players into two groups of four players, nine players into either groups of four and five players, or three groups of three players.

=== Partners versus cutthroat/solo ===
The differences partners spades and cutthroat bidding and play are substantial. In partners, a player would bid a trick for every ace, king, and queen in a side suit (i.e.: non-Spade). In cutthroat, a player would rarely bid on a king in a long side suit (5+ cards) nor a queen in any length side suit because of the risk of their being trumped. This risk is reduced in partners by the possibility that partner may be out of the long suit and able to discard or to overtrump an opponent.

In partners, nil bids are easier to make because the nil bidder's partner can overtake or trump the nil bidder's high cards. In cutthroat, this safety valve is not available.

Partners allows a mix of weak and strong players by pairing a weak player with a strong one, resulting in a more satisfying game (provided that the division of talent is about even) than in Cutthroat where individual weak players would stand little or no chance against strong players.

Conversely, against a computer program where the object is for a human to beat the computer software, being saddled with a weak computer partner does not provide a satisfying game. Thus, Cutthroat makes more sense for a computer game than Partners.

== Terminology ==
- Bag – An "overtrick". A trick taken by a player or partnership when their contract has already been met. The importance of bags or overtricks varies depending on house rules. Generally, taking too many overtricks incurs a penalty, but the taking of some overtricks can be good strategy.
- Bid – The number of tricks each player will take during a hand, announced by each player in term before a hand begins. The bid is the sum of each team members single bid, and is used to determine the total "team bid." The bid equals the total number of tricks the team must win, or risk being set (falling short of the bid) or taking sandbags, or bags (taking more tricks than were bid).
- Book – In spades, this is synonymous with "trick". Other trick-taking games have a different definition.
- Boston – When a team, usually by one player of the team or both, wins all 13 books in a hand.
- Contract – The result of a player's or partnership's bids for the hand. They are required to take at least that number of tricks during play of the hand.
- Cut or cutting – In spades, when a suit being played gets cut by a spade and thus takes the book, unless the following player trumps theirs with a higher spade. Also, when a partner trumps the other partners winning card, for example the first partner threw out a king of diamonds and their partner then trumped it with the ace of diamonds. There are times when this can be a strategic move, though not often.
- Extras – After adding up all the contracts the unclaimed tricks are "the extras". In 4 handed there are 13 tricks per hand. A typical hand has just one extra.
- Hand – A series of tricks in which all cards dealt to each player are played.
- Honor cards – Refers to the top four or five cards in each suit, A, K, Q, J and 10.
- Nil – A Bid to win no tricks at all in any hand. A special bid for which there is usually a bonus if the nil is achieved and a penalty if it is defeated by forcing the one who bid Nil to take a trick in any given hand.
- Partnership – A pair of players when playing with an even number. Their bids and taken tricks are summed.
- Renege – When a player can follow suit but does not, it is considered cheating.
- Set – To be unable to take the number of tricks required by a contract, usually because the opposing players have taken enough tricks that there are fewer remaining tricks than are needed.
- Slough (sluff) – also known as "throwing off", to play a card that is not a trump card but of different suit than the first suit played, therefore discarding that card. Sloughing is normally used to get rid of a card that may otherwise take a trick the player does not wish to take. It can also be used to void other suits allowing play of trump cards in tricks where that suit is led.
- Team – Largely synonymous with "partnership", but when playing with six or more a team can comprise more than two players.
- Three amigos – The A♠, K♠, and Q♠. When a person has all three it usually mentioned when they are being led out in order. Also, with the J♠, "the three amigos and their little brother".
- (To) follow suit – To play a card of the same suit as the first card played to a trick. As in many trick-taking games, Spades players are required to follow suit if they are able.
- Trick – Also known as a book. A unit of play in which each player lays one card from their hand, and is "taken" or won usually by the player who laid down the highest value card.
- Trump – A suit or other subset of cards in the deck that is of higher value than all others. Most games in the Whist family use a trump suit. In Spades, it is always the Spade suit. The term also refers to the playing of a trump card, also known as a "ruff" or "ruffing".
- Undertrick – A trick that a partnership needed in order to make contract, but didn't take. The term is used more in scoring than in play. A pair who bid 6 but only took five has an undertrick, while a specific trick in play that the partners need to take from a tactical standpoint is simply a "must-have" or "must-win".
- Void – To not have any card in a particular suit or suits, or to intentionally exhaust them from one's hand. A player must be void in at least one suit in order to play Spades as trump, and therefore will try to void their hand of a suit in which they hold few cards.
- Zero – See nil.

== See also ==
- Bid whist
- Contract bridge
- Tarneeb
- Vint
- Whist
