= Dummy whist =

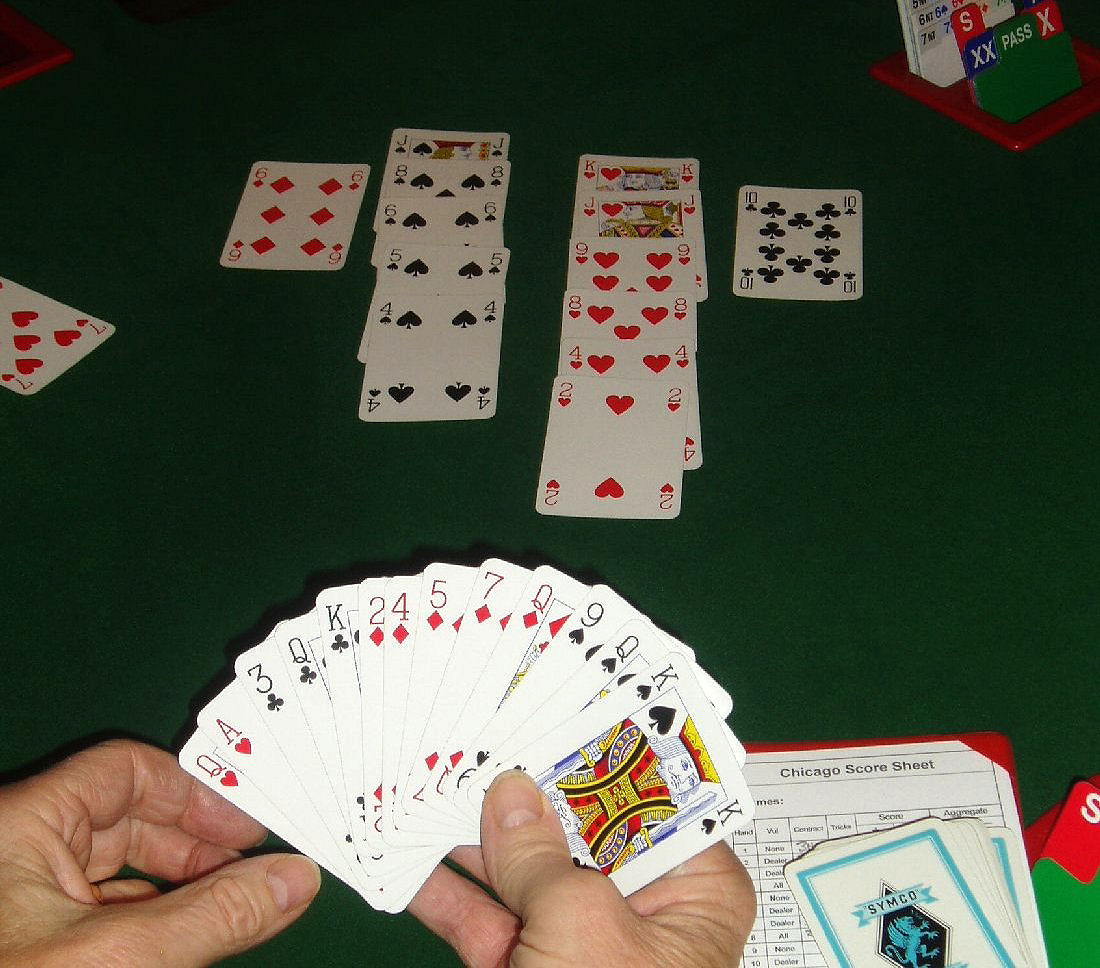
- Origin: England
- Family: Trick-taking
- Players: 3
- Skills: Tactics and strategy
- Cards: 52
- Deck: Anglo-American
- Play: Clockwise
- Playing time: 25 min.
- Chance: Medium

Related games
- Whist, Bridge

Dummy whist is one of many variants of the classic trick-taking card game Whist. The general rules of dummy whist are similar to that of bid whist, with two notable exceptions. Bid whist is played by four players, whereas dummy whist is played by only three. Secondly, instead of dealing a kitty, a dummy hand is dealt to be on the team of the player who wins the auction.

== Rules ==
Dummy whist is a version of whist for three players. The "dummy" is dealt 13 cards; the cards are kept face-down until after the auction, when the dummy's cards are turned face-up and facing opposite the declarer. After the dummy cards are turned face-up, the declarer declares a trump suit if he bid "uptown" or "downtown" or he declares uptown or downtown if he bid no-trump. If playing with jokers, the dummy is dealt 15 cards instead of the usual 13; the declarer is allowed to discard two cards from the dummy's hand before turning it face-up.

The rules of the game are the same as those of whist, with the following exceptions:

=== Bidding process ===
In dummy whist, after all of the cards have been dealt (but before the beginning of game play) each player may submit a bid. If a player chooses not to bid, the player may pass. The bidding starts with the player to the dealer's left and proceeds clockwise to each player in turn, ending with the dealer. In order to bid, a player must make a bid that is "better" (see below) than the best bid made by a previous player for the current hand. Unlike bridge, no deals are passed. If the first three players pass, the dealer (the last player) must make a bid. Unlike bid whist, dummy whist has no minimum bid.

A player's bid is a declaration of the minimum number of books (over the required six books) that will be taken (turned) by that player and their partner, followed by an indication either that the player wishes there to be no trump suit for the current hand, or of whether the player wants higher- or lower-ranking cards to be victorious in the current hand.

- In determining what makes a bid 'better' than a previous bid, the initial consideration is the number of books being declared. Bidding a higher number of books than the current bid is always sufficient for making a better bid. Bidding a lower number of books can never be sufficient. If a player wishes to bid the same number of books as the current, the next consideration is whether the current bid indicated there would be no trump suit. If not (and the current bid indicates there will be a trump suit), the player now bidding may better the current bid by claiming the same number of books (but now bidding that there will be no trump suit). If the current bid already indicates there will be no trump suit, that bid may only be bettered with a higher number of books.
- In some variations, a bid which indicates that there will be a trump suit (and that higher-ranking cards will win) can also be bettered by bidding the same number of books and indicating that there will be a trump suit and that lower ranking-cards will win. In other variations, however, bids for higher- and lower-ranking cards (each with the same number of books) are considered equal.
- At the end of the bidding process, the player who has made the best bid is deemed to have won the bid. The winning bidder's indication, regarding either no-trump or the ranking of cards, is granted for the duration of the hand. That player and the dummy are now committed to taking at least the number of books indicated in the bid. The opposing players are committed to "setting" the bidding team by preventing them from succeeding in taking the number of books to which they are committed.
- After the auction, if the dummy was dealt 15 cards the declarer may discard two cards from the dummy's hand and the dummy's hand is turned face-up. If playing with 13 cards in the dummy's hand, their hand is turned face-up without discarding any cards.
- If the winning bid indicated a desire for no trump suit, before the beginning of play the winning bidder must indicate whether high-or low-ranking cards will be victorious during that hand. Conversely, if the winning bid indicated whether high- or low-ranking cards would win during this hand the winning bidder must now declare a trump suit for this hand. In high-winning hands, an ace serves as the highest card of its suit (better than a king). In low-ranking hands, an ace serves as the lowest card of its suit (better than a two).
- If there is a trump suit in the upcoming hand and jokers are being used, the jokers become the best cards of the trump suit (better than the ace) regardless of whether high- or low-ranking cards are the winners. If there is no trump suit, the jokers are worthless.

=== Play ===
The object of the game is to win tricks. A trick consists of four cards: one from the hand of each player and one from the dummy, in rotation, with the dummy sitting across from the declarer, the first card played to a trick called the lead. A player is required to follow suit to the card led, if possible. Failure to follow suit when a player has a card of the suit played is called a renege (see below). If the player cannot follow suit, he may play any card. Some people play that if the hand is a no trump hand and a player has a joker in his hand, he must throw off the joker the first time a suit is played and the player does not have a card of the suit played. Other players play that if the hand is a no-trump hand, players who have a joker must turn in the joker for one of the discarded cards in the kitty. A disadvantage of the latter is that it indicates which suit the bid-taker has discarded.

For trump bids, it is generally preferred to cut a suit with a trump card when the player cannot follow the suit controlled by the opponents. The highest bidder always plays the first lead card in the game. After this play, the player who won the trick leads off to the player seated at his left. The play continues in this way until all 13 tricks have been played.

When a trick is completed (four cards played), a member of the side which won the trick takes the four cards, turns them face-down and places them in front of him in a row. It is customary for one player to take in all the tricks won by his side. The tricks should be kept separated from one another, so a previous trick can be referred to if necessary. A player may turn and look back at the last trick until he (or his partner) has led (or played to the next player). After that he may not look at any previous tricks, unless a renege is called.

=== Renege ===
If a player fails to follow suit (for example, clubs are led and a player has a club but plays a spade or another suit), the player has reneged; the opposing players must spot the renege and call it. If a renege is called, the player calling it must name the specific book where the renege occurred. If the player successfully calls the renege, the team reneging loses three tricks. If the player calls a renege and cannot identify the book where the renege occurred, the team calling the renege loses three tricks.

=== Scoring ===
Each player begins the game with a score of zero. At the end of each hand, the declarer either wins points by making their bid or loses by failing to take enough books to satisfy their bid (known as "being set"). The game ends when a player wins by achieving a cumulative score of 21 or more.

At the end of each hand, books held by the player who won the bid are counted. There are 13 altogether, corresponding to the 13 cards played by each player. Each book won above six counts toward the player's bid. In order to make his bid, the declarer must take at least the number of books equal to six (plus their bid).

- If the declarer makes his bid, he scores one point for every book he took after the initial six. If he fails to take enough books for his bid, he scores nothing for his books; instead, his opponents gain the number of points equal to his bid.

Note: If Player A won the bid with a 5 High they must take 11 tricks (initial 6 plus his bid of 5) to make his bid. If he only takes 10 books, Player A would have failed his bid (being set) and both opposing players would gain 5 points. On the other hand, if Player A made 12 books on his 5 bid he scores a total of 6 points for that hand.

- If a player takes all 13 tricks (initial 6 plus 7), this is called a "Boston". A player can make a Boston regardless of the number of tricks bid.
- If a player bids 7, this is also called "bidding a Boston". In this case, the bidding player is saying that the opposing players will not collect any tricks; this often scores double.
- A no-trump bid can sometimes score double. For example, if you bid a four no trump and do not make the bid, it counts for eight points against your team. Conversely, if you make a four no trump bid, it counts as eight for your team).
- Rather than counting the tricks won, most players keep track of the tricks taken by the opposing players (for example, it takes four books to set a four, three books to set a five, two books to set a six and so forth).

=== Variations ===
Double dummy

Double dummy is played by two players, each having a dummy (or exposed hand) for his partner. The rules do not differ from dummy whist, except for the following: there is no misdeal, as the deal is a disadvantage.

Humbug

The players sit opposite each other and four hands are dealt, leaving the dead hands face down. Each player has the option of playing with the cards, or throwing the hand in and taking the dead hand on his right instead. If one player plays the hand as dealt, all scores are doubled; if both play, they are quadrupled. (See also German whist)

== See also ==
- Solo whist
- Bid whist
- Knock-out whist
