= Misdeal (cards) =

Error made during a card game

A misdeal in card games is an error by the dealer which calls for a re-deal and/or a penalty. The rules for a misdeal and penalty vary according to the game. A misdeal is sometimes called by miscounting, or when two cards stick together. Sometimes, when a misdeal is detected, a new hand is dealt. In most games a misdeal, and recall of the cards, does not prevent the same player dealing again.

Sometimes game book authors or tournament organisers may lay down specific misdeal rules in e.g. Pinochle, Spades, and Euchre.
