= Knock-out whist =

Card game

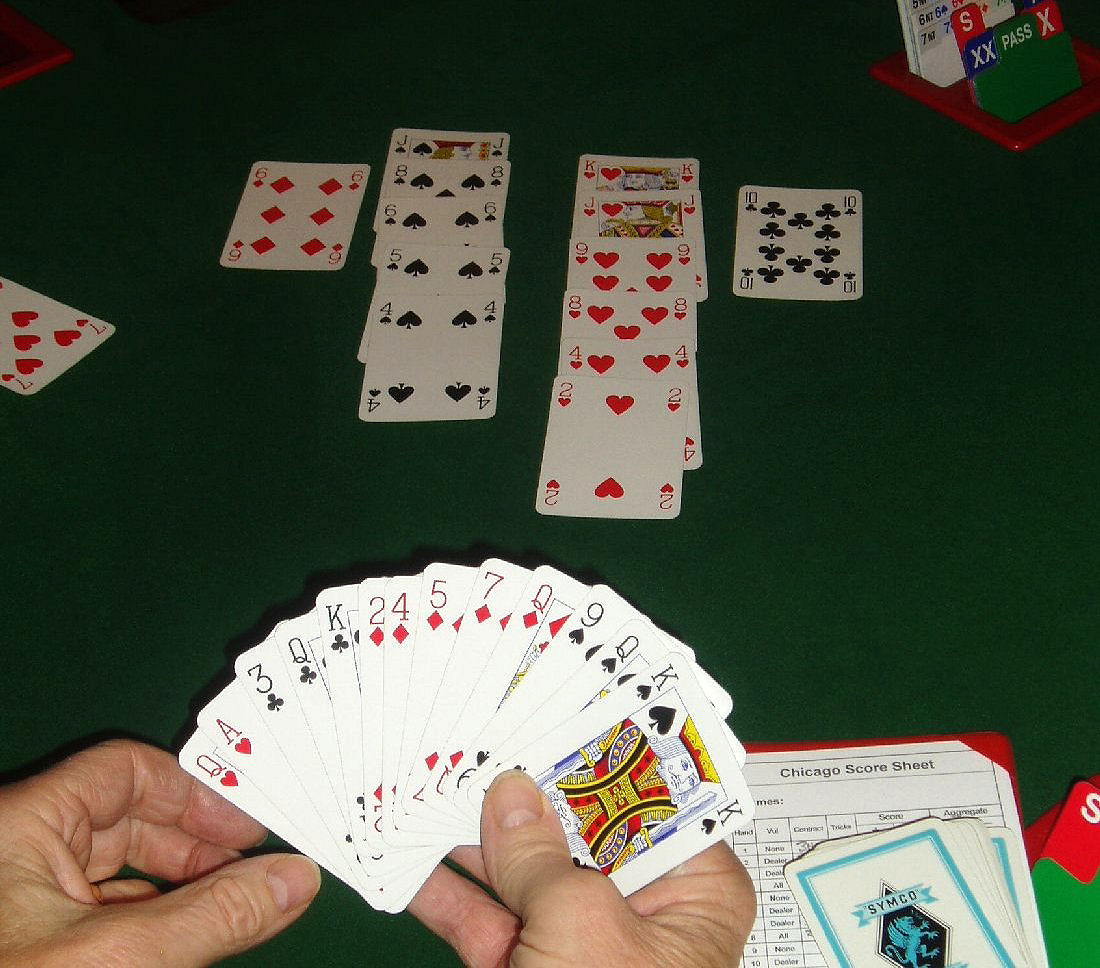
- Origin: England
- Family: Trick-taking
- Players: 2-7
- Skills: Tactics and strategy
- Cards: 52(excluding Jokers)
- Deck: Anglo-American
- Play: Clockwise
- Playing time: 5–15 min.
- Chance: Medium

Related games
- Bid whist

Knock-out whist or knockout whist is a member of the whist family known by a variety of names including trumps in Britain, reduction whist, diminishing whist (from the way one fewer card is dealt each hand) and rat. It is often simply called whist by players who are unfamiliar with the game formally known as whist. It is a basic trick-taking game and is a good way to teach the concept of tricks to children.

== Rules ==
=== Overview and equipment ===
The game may be played by two to seven players. The aim is to be the last player left in at the end of the game, with the object in each hand being to win a majority of tricks. A standard 52-card pack is used. The cards in each suit rank from highest to lowest: A K Q J 10 9 8 7 6 5 4 3 2.

=== Deal ===
For the first hand, the dealer deals seven cards to each player and one card is turned up to indicate that its suit is the trump suit for the first round. In subsequent hands, the deal rotates to the left and the player who took the most tricks selects trumps in the next hand. If two or more players tie for the highest number of tricks taken, they cut cards to decide who calls trumps. The deal rotates clockwise and one fewer card is dealt in each successive hand until the final hand is played which consists of one card each.

=== Play ===
Eldest hand (the player to the dealer's left) leads to the first trick; any card may be led. The other players, in clockwise order, each play a card to the trick and must follow suit by playing a card of the suit led if able. A player with no cards of the suit led may play any card, either discarding or trumping. The trick is won by the highest card of the suit led, unless a trump is played, in which case the highest trump wins. The winner of the trick leads to the next trick. Some rules disallow leading trumps before the trump suit has been 'broken' by a trump being played to the lead of another suit (though of course leading trumps is always permissible if a player holds nothing else).

=== Knockout ===
At the end of each hand, any player who took no tricks is knocked out (hence the name) and takes no further part in the game.

The game is won at any stage when a player takes all the tricks in a round, as all other players are knocked out.

=== Variations ===
The following variations may be played:

- No picture, no play. Until the card count is below 5 a player can declare "no picture, no play" if no card in their hand is higher than a ten. All the cards are thrown in and the hand is re dealt.
- Rainbow. When exactly four cards are dealt, any player holding one card of each suit (♣ ♥ ♠ ♦) declares that a "rainbow" and automatically wins that round with no play required. The card count then goes down to three. If more than one person has rainbow, then the cards are cut to decide who calls trump.
- Dog's Life. The first player who takes no tricks is awarded a "dog's life". In the next hand, that player is dealt one card and can decide which trick to play it to. Each time a trick is played the "dog" may either play the card or knock on the table and wait to play it later. If the dog wins a trick, the player to the left leads to the next and the dog re-enters the game properly in the next hand. If the dog fails, they are knocked out.
- Pack of dogs. Every player gets one dog's chance.
- Blind dog. A player who is already on a dog's chance but loses their card gets a "blind dog's chance" whereby they are dealt a face-down card in the next round and may decide when to use it without looking at it. If they fail to take a trick with it, they are knocked out.

== See also ==
- Whist
- Bid whist
- Dummy whist
