= Bid whist =

Card game

Bid Whist
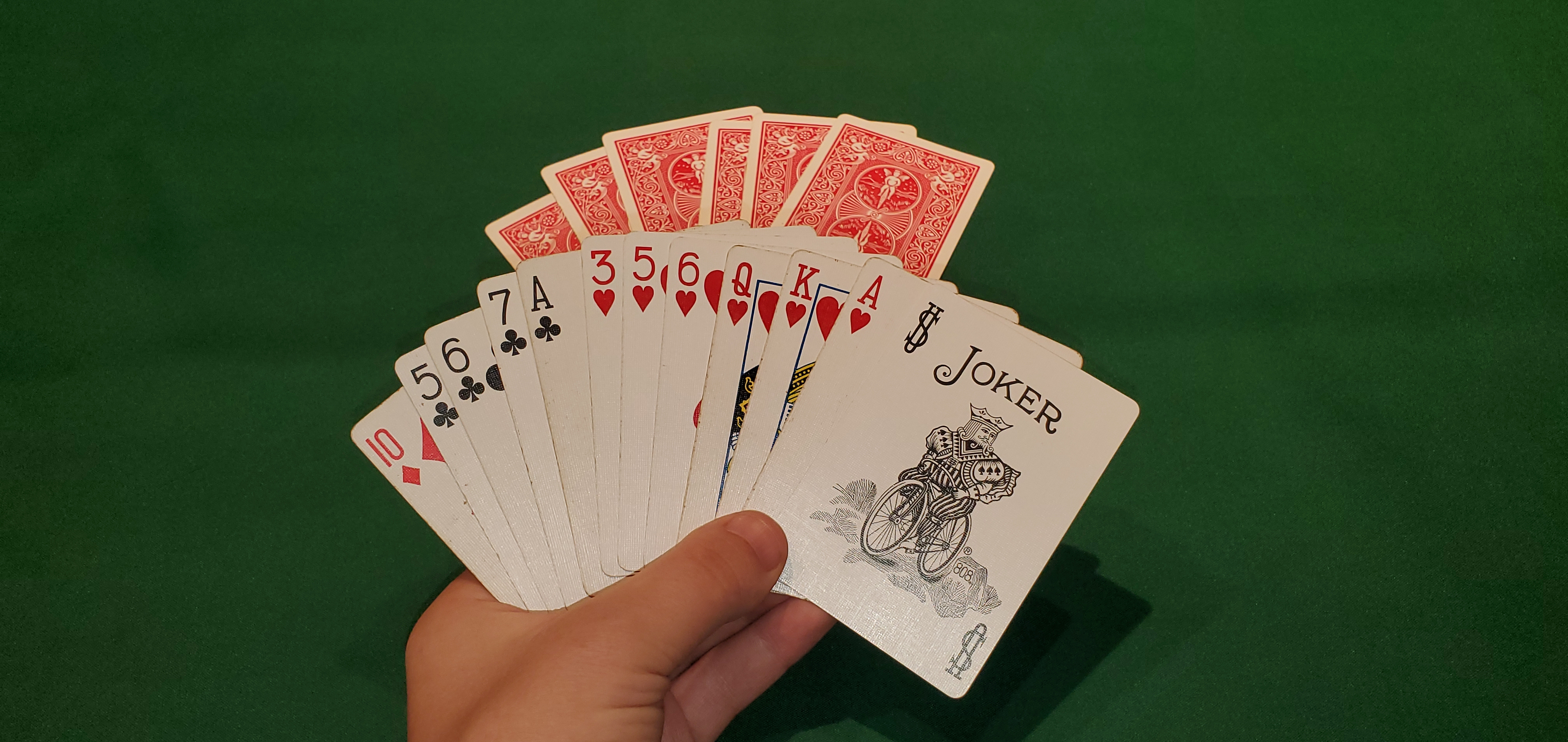
- Origin: United States
- Family: Trick-taking
- Players: 4
- Skills: Tactics and strategy
- Cards: 52 card deck to 54 with 2 jokers included
- Deck: French
- Play: Clockwise
- Playing time: 25 min.
- Chance: Medium

Related games
- Whist

Bid whist is a partnership trick-taking variant of the classic card game whist. As indicated by the name, bid whist adds a bidding element to the game that is not present in classic whist. Bid whist, remains popular particularly in U.S. military culture and the United States jail and prison system. Its cousin Spades, has a longstanding tradition in African-American culture.

== The game ==
The general play of bid whist is similar to that of whist, with four notable exceptions. In whist, the trump suit for a given hand is determined at random by the last card dealt, whereas in bid whist, the trump suit (or whether there will even be a trump suit) for a given hand is determined by the outcome of the bidding process.

Secondly, whether a trick is won by the higher-ranking card of the winning suit, or by the lower-ranking card of that suit is also determined by the outcome of the bidding process.

Thirdly, since the ace is always the most powerful card (excluding jokers, which are optional), whether the ace is the highest-ranking card of the suit or the lowest-ranking card can change from hand to hand, depending on whether higher-ranking cards or lower-ranking cards win in that hand. In "uptown" games, in which higher cards win tricks over lower cards, the ace is "high," ranking above the king. In "downtown" games, in which lower cards take tricks over higher ones, the ace is "low", below the 2 - making it again, the best card (excluding jokers if these are used).

Lastly, the scoring of the game is handled differently from regular Whist.

=== Card ranking ===
Uptown

Trumps: Big joker, little joker, A, K, Q, J, 10, 9, 8, 7, 6, 5, 4, 3, 2

Non-trump: A, K, Q, J, 10, 9, 8, 7, 6, 5, 4, 3, 2

Downtown

Trumps: Big joker, little joker, A, 2, 3, 4, 5, 6, 7, 8, 9, 10, J, Q, K

Non-trump: A, 2, 3, 4, 5, 6, 7, 8, 9, 10, J, Q, K

=== Kitty ===
In most variations, a 'kitty' of four, five, or six cards is dealt separately from the cards delivered to each player. If no jokers are being used, the kitty will consist of four cards. If one joker is being used, the kitty will consist of five cards. And if two jokers are being used, the kitty will consist of six cards.

The winner of the bid auction can use the kitty. They add these cards to their hand and discard an equal number face down, which technically form the first trick taken of their bid. (This is similar to the skat in Skat.)

=== Bidding process ===
In bid whist, after all of the cards have been dealt, but prior to the beginning of game play, each player may submit a bid. If a player chooses not to bid, the player may pass. Just as with the game play, the bidding starts with the player to the dealer's left and proceeds clockwise to each player in turn, ending with the dealer.

In order to bid, a player must make a bid that is 'better' (see below) than the best bid made by a previous player for the current hand. Unlike bridge, no deals are passed. If the first three players pass, the dealer (the last player) must make a bid. Most games set a minimum bid of at least four, though "officially" three is the minimum bid.

A player's bid consists of a declaration of the minimum number of books (over the required 6 books) that will be taken (turned) by that player and their partner, followed by an indication either that the player wishes there to be no trump suit for the current hand, or of whether the player wishes for higher-ranking or for lower-ranking cards to be victorious in the current hand.

In determining what makes a bid 'better' than a previous bid, the initial consideration is the number of books being declared. Bidding a higher number of books than the current bid is always sufficient for making a better bid. Bidding a lower number of books can never be sufficient. If a player wishes to bid the same number of books as the current, the next consideration is whether the current bid indicated there would be no trump suit. If not, and the current bid indicates that there will be a trump suit, then the player now bidding may better the current bid by claiming the same number of books but now bidding that there will be no trump suit. If the current bid already indicates there will be no trump suit, that bid may only be bettered by indicating a higher number of books.

In some variations, a bid which indicates that there will be a trump suit, and that higher-ranking cards will win, can also be bettered by bidding the same number of books and indicating that there will be a trump suit, and that lower-ranking cards will win. In other variations, however, a bid for higher-ranking cards and a bid for lower-ranking cards, each with the same number of books, are considered equal bids. A no trump bid can be made without an over bid and can be a high(uptown)or a low(downtown) bid. A no trump bid takes out a trump bid.

At the end of the bidding process, the player who has made the best bid is deemed to have won the bid. The winning bidder's indication regarding either having no trump suit, or the ranking of cards is granted for the duration of the hand. That player and their partner are now committed to taking at least the number of books indicated in the bid. The opposing player and their partner are committed to 'setting' the bidding team by preventing the bidding team from succeeding in taking the number of books to which they are committed.

If the winning bid indicated a desire for no trump suit, then prior to the beginning of game play, the winning bidder must now indicate whether high-ranking or low-ranking cards will be victorious during that hand. Conversely, if the winning bid indicated whether high- or low-ranking cards would win during this hand, the winning bidder must now declare a trump suit for this hand. In high-winning hands, an ace serves as the highest card of its suit (better than a king). In low-ranking hands, an ace serves as the lowest card of its suit (under the 2).

After making this final declaration, the player receives into their hand the cards from the kitty (if one was used), and the player then discards an equal number of cards from their hand. In some variations, the cards of the kitty are overturned (sported) to be visible to all players prior to the winning bidder taking those cards into their hand. In other variations, the kitty is not sported, and only the winning bidder sees what cards they are. The most commonly played variation is to sport the kitty when there is a trump suit, and not sport when there is no trump suit.

If there is a trump suit in the upcoming hand, and if jokers are being used, the jokers become the best cards of the trump suit (better than the ace) regardless of whether high-ranking cards or low-ranking cards are the winners. If there is no trump suit, the jokers are worthless.

=== Play ===
The objective of the play is to win tricks. A trick consists of four cards, one from the hand of each player, in rotation, the first card played to a trick generally being called the lead. A player is required to follow suit to the card led, if possible. Failure to follow suit when a player has a card of the suit played is called a renege (see Renege below). If the player cannot follow suit, he may play any card.

Some people play that if the hand is a no trump hand and a player has a joker in his hand, he must throw off the joker the first time a suit is played and the player does not have a card of the suit played. Other players play that if the hand is a no-trump hand, players who have a joker must turn in the joker for one of the discarded cards in the kitty. Many people do not like to play the latter way, because it gives an indication of what suit the bid-taker has discarded.

For trump bids, it is generally preferred to cut a suit with a trump card when the player cannot follow the suit controlled by the opponents. The highest bidder always plays the first lead card in the game. After this play, the player who won the trick leads off to the player seated at his left. The play continues in this way until all twelve tricks have been played.

When a trick is completed, i.e., four cards played, a member of the side which won the trick takes the four cards, turns them face down, and places them in front of him in a row. It is customary for one player to take in all the tricks won by his side. The tricks should be kept separated from one another so that any previous trick can be referred to, if necessary. A player may turn and look back at the last trick until he or his partner has led or played to the next player. After that, he may not look at any previous tricks, unless a renege is called.

=== Strategy ===
Bid whist is a game of skills and strategy. While you cannot audibly tell your partner what you want him to play (this is called talking across the board), there are many non-verbal cues that partners give each other during play. It is very common for a player to indicate to his partner in what suit he has a winner other than trump. This is usually done by the player playing a card from a strong suit in his hand when he is out of the trump suit.

For example, trumps are hearts and it's an uptown (high cards win) hand. A player has strong diamonds, e.g., an ace, king, queen. When that player runs out of hearts, the next time hearts are played, he will throw off a low diamond. This typically tells his partner he has some help for him in diamonds.

Skilled players typically pull trumps. This means they start off playing the trump suit and "pulls" all the trumps from the opponents. Once trumps are pulled from the opponents, the bidding player will begin playing his offsuit. A player will not continue to play trumps when the opponents are out of trumps, saving his trumps to cut another suit that is played.

Not pulling trumps can lead to a team being set. For example: trumps are spades and the bid is uptown, high cards winning. An opposing player has one spade — a three of spades — and no diamonds. The bidding player has an ace, king and queen of diamonds. Instead of pulling trumps from his opponents, the player plays his ace of diamonds.

The opposing player with no diamonds and (for this hand) a lousy trump, will cut the ace of diamonds and take the trick. The bidding player should have first pulled trumps and then played his offsuit, the diamonds. Similarly, if the bidding player's partner takes a trick, he will give the lead back to his partner by leading back trumps, giving control back to his partner.

If the partner began playing what he thinks are winning cards, he runs the risk of one of the opposing players not having the suit played and cutting with a trump card. Also, by playing something other than his partner's trump, he opens up his partner's hand for the opposing team to see. That is, the opposing team will see what suit, other than trump, is in the bidding player's hand. The opposing team will then know what suit to keep for play when the trump suit is not played.

=== Renege ===
If a player fails to follow suit, e.g., clubs are led, player has a club, but plays a spade (or some other suit), the player has reneged. It is up to the opposing team to spot the renege and call it. If a renege is called, the player calling it must find the specific book where the renege occurred after going through the made books.

If the player successfully calls the renege, the team reneging loses three tricks (books). If the player calls a renege and cannot identify the exact book where the renege occurred after reviewing the made books, then the team calling the renege loses three tricks.

=== Scoring ===
Each team begins the game with a score of zero. At the end of each hand, the bidding team either wins points by making their bid or loses points by failing to take enough books to satisfy their bid (known as being set). The game ends when a team wins by achieving a cumulative score of seven or more, or loses by reaching a cumulative score of minus seven or worse.

At the end of each hand, the books that the team that won the bid are counted. There are 13 altogether, corresponding to the 12 cards played by each player plus the kitty (if one is used), which counts as a book won by the bidder's team. Each book won above six counts toward the team's bid. In order to make their bid, the bidding team must take at least the number of books equal to six plus their bid.

- If the bidding team makes their bid, they score one point for every book they took after the initial six. If they fail to take enough books for their bid, they score nothing for their books, and instead their bid is subtracted from their score. A team may win more than they bid, but may lose only what was bid. In either case, the opponents of the bidding team neither win nor lose any points.

Note: If Team A won the bid with a 5 High they must take 11 tricks (Initial 6 plus their bid of 5) to make their bid. If they only take 10 books (the kitty and 9 other books) Team A would have failed their bid (also known as being set) and they would go back 5 points. On the other hand if Team A made 12 books (the kitty plus 11 other books) on our 5 bid, we will score a total of 6 points for that hand.

- If a team takes all 13 tricks (initial 6 plus 7), this is commonly called a Boston. A team can make a Boston regardless of the number of tricks that are bid.
- If a player bids 7, this is also called bidding a Boston. In this case, the bidding player is saying that the opposing team will not collect any tricks.
- A no trump bid can sometimes score double (e.g. if you bid a four no trump and do not make the bid, it counts for eight points against your team. Conversely, if you make a four no trump bid, it counts as eight for your team).
- Rather than counting the tricks won, most players keep track of the tricks taken by the opposing team (e.g., it takes four books to set a four, three books to set a five, two books to set a six, and so forth).
- If a team wins a game by bidding a Boston, the total tally for the game counts as two wins.

=== Speeding up the game ===
Some people play that if you miss two bids (missing a bid being called a "felony" also called "lies") you lose. This usually happens at card parties when there are other pairs waiting to play. This may be to speed up the game, as people can go on for hours going up and down before achieving seven positive (winning) or negative points (losing). You can also speed up the game by "going out the back door" i.e. the losing bid (points) goes to the opponent. Say one team has bid successfully for a three and later the opposing team bids four and gets set, the team with three wins.

When there are more than two pairs of players, you can choose to play 'Rise and Fly'. If one pair gets 'set', or doesn't make their bid, they must get up and let the next waiting pair sit and play. This is the most common practice when playing with more than four people. This is not done when keeping score. When the opponent reaches a score of seven or more, they have won. That's when the loser gets up, or 'rises'.

== Cutthroat bid whist ==
Bid whist may also be played as an individual game. For most players, the standard 54-card deck with a 6-card kitty may be used. For a five-player game, the kitty should be reduced to four cards.

=== Bidding ===
Bids begin with least number, and indicate the number of books the player expects to take. This number is not the bid plus six, but is an exact number (a bid of 4 would require the individual to take at least 4 books). Since players do not need to communicate with a partner, there is no need to indicate uptown or downtown with their bid. Thus, the bids, from lowest to highest, are: 1, 1NT, 2, 2NT, 3, 3NT, etc. After all but one player has passed, the player with the highest bid then announces uptown or downtown plus the trump suit, if applicable, and takes the kitty. That player is then solely responsible to take at least the number of tricks bid.

=== Scoring ===
At the conclusion of the hand, each player, including the winner of the bid, scores 1 point, individually, for each trick taken. If the bid winner fails to make his bid, he scores zero points, and loses the amount of his bid. The first player to score 30 points, individually, is the winner.

== See also ==
- Dummy whist
- Knock-out Whist
- Whist
