= Parlaire =

Parlaire, literally French for "talking", refers to two card games in which players were allowed to communicate to their partners about their cards:

- Quadrette, a four-player, short version of Whist
- Sizette, a six-player version of Whist
