= Shelem =

Card game

- Origin: Iran
- Alternative names: Rok, Roque, Rokm
- Type: Trick-taking
- Players: 2×2
- Cards: 52-card
- Deck: French
- Rank (high→low): A K Q J 10 9 8 7 6 5 4 3 2
- Chance: Low – moderate

Related games
- Rook, Whist

Shelem (Persian: شلم Shělěm), also called Rok or similar, is an Iranian trick-taking card game with four players in two partnerships, bidding and competing against each other. Bidding and trump are declared in every hand by the bidding winner. Both the name and the point structure of this game are similar to the American game Rook, there being a possible connection between the two games. Though it isn't clear from which game it is derived.

== Etymology ==
The word Shelem comes from the French word chelem (slam in English), as used in French since the 18th century for whist, and later bridge, which means winning all the tricks in the round. The term slam is used in trick-taking games such as Bridge, Spades and Whist.

== Rules ==
Card-point values
Rank	A	K	Q	J	10	9	8	7	6	5	4	3	2
Value	10	–			10	–				5	–		

Each player receives 12 cards in batches of 4. The remaining 4 cards form a widow, to be taken up by the player who makes a contract. Starting with eldest hand, the players bid (in multiples of 5) for the privilege of taking up the widow and making trumps. The minimum bid is 100, and there are 165 points in the game. A player who does not want to overbid the previous bid may pass, but cannot bid again later in the same round. The highest bidder becomes declarer, takes up the widow, and discards 4 cards face down to return to the original number of cards (12). The discarded pile becomes the declarer's team's first trick (including any points).

Declarer leads to the first trick. The suit of the card led becomes the trump suit. The remainder of the deal is played according to the standard trick-play rules as in Whist or Hokm. The cards discarded by the highest bidder count for declarer's party as in most comparable games, or for the winner of the last trick as in Rook.

Each party makes the card-points in tricks won plus 5 points for every trick. If declarer's party is successful, they score what they made, or 330 points (or what they bid multiplied by 2, in another variant of the game) if they win all tricks (i.e., achieve a shelem or slam). If they are not successful, they lose what they bid, doubled if they make less than their opponents (or less than half of what they bid, in some variants). The opponents always score precisely what they made. There's no penalty for scoring points above the bid amount. In the shelem/slam case, the other form of scoring is that the declarer's party score what they bid, and the opponent lose exactly the same points.

== Variations ==
- Instead of declaring trumps with the first card played, declarer may also choose one of the following modes of play:
  - In the Nares variation, the hierarchy of cards in trick-play is reversed and there are no trumps
  - Ace-Nares is like Nares, but the aces are still the highest cards in trick-play.
  - Sarres: Sarres is plays like the normal game, ace down to 2 except that there is no ruling card in this game.
- The aces may be worth 15 card-points each, resulting in a total 185 points in the game.

== Glossary ==
- Seesawing (Arreh keshi) - the situation when no bidding suit remains except in the declarer's hand and the declarer's mate is holding and playing another winning suit from high to low, helping the declarer get rid of his holes.
- Khâli kardan - the situation were the claiming team cannot succeed to get their bid value.
- Hole - a suit (or sometimes suits) that are the declarer's weak points.
- Hole-Free - when the declarer has no weakness in his hand, his hand is called hole-free.
- Molali Koor - literally means Blind Clergy Ali's hand. It is a hand that Shelems no matter what the teammate has. This hand is hole-free and usually happens a couple of times in a 1200-point tournament.
- Jozve Khaan - literally means booklet reader and refers to players who have read the booklet of Shelem.
- Poisson distribution of hands - refers to equally distributed hands by means of their power.
- Zamin - literally means ground. The initial four cards that are set aside by the dealer.
- NaderShelem - term given to the situation when the "hakem" forgets his "hokm".
- Chagh Kardan (khorak) - to play a card that has a point: 5, 10 or ace.
- Daste Panke - literally means fan hand. Term given to a hand that is so good (or bad) that it wins (loses) the round even if you randomly play the cards (which would happen if a fan is blowing at the cards instead of a player playing the hand).
