= Swedish whist =

Swedish card game

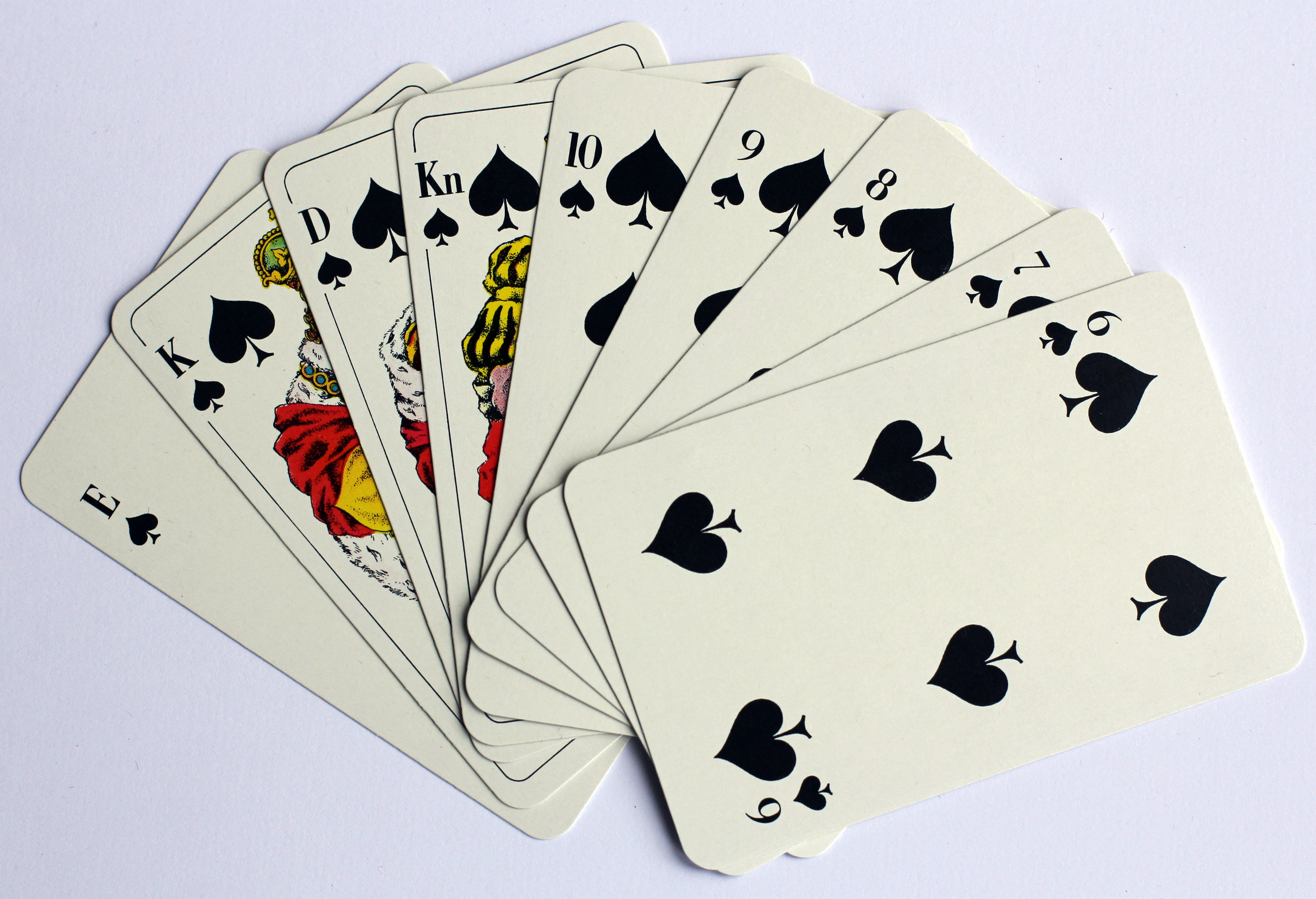
- Spades from a Modern Swedish pattern pack
- Origin: Sweden
- Alternative names: Fyrmanswhist
- Type: Whist group
- Players: 4
- Cards: 52 cards
- Deck: French-suited, Swedish Modern pattern
- Rank (high→low): A K Q J 10 9 8 7 6 5 4 3 2
- Playing time: 5 min/deal

Related games
- Whist

Swedish whist (Swedish: svensk whist), also called Fyrmanswhist ("Four-hand whist") or, regionally, just whist, is a Swedish trick-taking card game. Knowing four-player whist is useful for playing other card games because it was the prototype for trick-taking games.

== History ==
The game emerged in the 1950s in Sweden, but first appeared in the literature in 1967. It may be a derivative of the classic Swedish game of Priffe. Swedish whist was very popular in Sweden in the 1970s and 1980s.

== Description ==
Swedish whist is played by four players in teams of two using a standard 52-card pack, typically of the Modern Swedish pattern. Cards rank in their natural order, aces high. The first dealer is chosen by lot and then rotates after each deal. The dealer deals all the cards, one by one.

Players examine their hands and decide whether to play 'red' or 'black', i.e., whether they want to take as many tricks as possible (red) or as few as possible (black). Players indicate their choice by placing a red card (of the suit of hearts or diamonds) or a black card (of the suit of clubs or spades) at the bottom of their cards, bearing in mind that all players may see this card during the bidding.

Forehand begins the bidding by showing his bottom card. If it is black, this is the equivalent of calling "pass" (pass) and the next player reveals his bottom card. If all four players show a black card, they play a black or 'null game', (nollspel) in which the aim is to lose tricks.

As soon as a player reveals a red card, it is the equivalent of announcing "play" (spel). The bidding ends and a normal game is played, whereby teams aim to win tricks.

Once the bidding is over, forehand leads to the first trick. Players must follow suit if able.

When one side has announced they will play (red game), they get one point for each trick over six that they take. If they lose (i.e. take fewer than seven tricks) their opponents score double for each trick above six. In a null game (black game), where neither side has announced an intention to win, the winners must take fewer than seven tricks. The winning side then gets one point for each trick under seven.

The Game is usually 13 points.

Although the rules are simple, the game requires good memory, strategy and skill.

== Bibliography ==
- Glimne, Dan (2016). Kortspelshandboken (3rd, expanded ed.). Stockholm: Känguru. pp. 135–136. ISBN 978-91-7663-115-7.
- Linderfelt, Klas August (1885). The Game of Preference or Swedish Whist. Milwaukee.
- Lundell, Hans (2010). Familjens bästa spel för kort och tärning (New ed.). Sundbyberg: Semic. pp. 39–40. ISBN 978-91-552-5564-0.
- Sevedsdotter, Åsa (1991). Lagt kort ligger. Stockholm: Info Books. pp. 62–63. ISBN 91-7003-097-9.
- Schenkmanis, Ulf (1988). Kortspel & patienser. Västerås: ICA. pp. 38–41. ISBN 91-534-1178-1.
- Holmström, Björn (1981). Stora kortspelsboken. Stockholm: Prisma. p. 49. ISBN 91-518-1446-3.
