= Call-ace Whist =

Danish card game

Call-ace whist
- Origin: Denmark
- Alternative names: Es-Makker Whist, Esmakker Whist, whist
- Type: Trick-taking
- Players: 4
- Cards: 52 + 3 Jokers
- Deck: French-suited
- Rank (high→low): A K Q J 10 9 8 7 6 5 4 3 2
- Play: Clockwise

Related games
- Whist, Bid Whist

Call-ace whist (Danish: Esmakker Whist) or Danish whist is a card game for four players playing in variable partnerships. It is the most popular form of Whist in Denmark, where it is often just called "Whist". It has a well developed bidding system and has imported from the traditional Danish game of Skærvindsel the feature of determining the partnerships by 'calling an ace'. John McLeod records that there is also a version of Danish whist in which there are fixed partnerships.

== Cards ==
Call-ace whist is played with a standard 52-card pack, traditionally of the Danish pattern which includes 3 Jokers that are used in the game. Cards rank in their natural order, Aces high. In some rules, aces are low in the negative contracts.

== Rules ==
There are many local variations of the rules. The following are based on kortdrengene.dk, supplemented by other sources as cited.

=== Preliminaries ===
The game is for four players. If there are five, the dealer sits out. Deal and play are clockwise. The dealer shuffles the pack and offers it to the right for cutting. The cutter may opt to knock on the cards instead of cutting. The dealer then deals 13 cards each in any way desired and 3 to a talon called the cat (Katten) which is placed face down in the middle of the table.

Some rules allow a player dealt a hand with no court cards, Jokers or aces to call for a redeal by announcing "iron hand" (Jernhånd).

=== Auction ===
The auction consists of a single round of bidding with immediate escalation. Forehand opens the bidding by saying "pass" or naming a contract. The next player must now overcall or pass. If a bid is overcalled the first bidder may raise to a higher contract or pass. This continues between the two players until one passes. The next player in turn then enters the bidding by overcalling or passing. In certain contracts, a later player may "play too" i.e. 'go with' (gå med) the contract, taking it over from the earlier bidder. If all pass, the cards are thrown in and redealt.

Players may bid a normal contract by naming the number of tricks they intend to win with the aid of a partner e.g. "8" or "11". A normal contract may be outbid either by a higher number of tricks or by qualifying the contract with what is called an "attachment". The attachments, in ascending order, are:

- Tournee (Vip): the declarer calls an ace but the trump suit is determined by flipping the cards in the cat one by one until the declarer accepts the suit revealed or turns the 3rd card. If the latter is a Joker, the game is played at no trump.
- Good (Gode): the trump suit is clubs.
- Half (Halve): the player with the called ace decides trumps, but may not choose the suit of the called ace.

Some rules add the following attachments:

- Strong (Stærke): the trump suit is spades. Ranks below a Good.
- No Trump (Sans): There are no trumps.

So a bid of "8" may be outbid by "8 good" or "8 tournee". The attachments do not outbid one another; if "8 good" is bid, it can only be outbid by "9" or higher.

In addition there are the following negative or Nolo contracts in which the declarer plays alone against the 3 defenders, there are no trumps and aces are low:

- Solo (Sol): The declarer must take exactly one trick. Overcalled by 9 Tournee or higher.
- Nolo (Ren Sol): The declarer must take no tricks. Overcalled by 10 Tournee or higher.
- Open Solo (Bordlægger): As a Solo except that after the first trick the declarer must lay his cards down face up and play ouverte. Overcalled by 11 Tournee or higher.
- Open Nolo (Ren Bordlægger): As a Nolo but the declarer plays ouverte after the first trick. (Note: This is the Østerbro rule. At kortdrengene.dk they play a Super Nolo (Super Bordlægger), a Solo in which all the players play ouverte from the outset.) Overcalled by 12 Tournee or higher.

Some rules replace the Open Nolo by a Super Nolo in which everyone plays ouverte from the start or by a Double Nolo in which all play ouverte after the first trick.

=== Trumps, calling an ace and exchanging ===
The highest bid wins the auction and its bidder becomes the declarer. In normal contracts, the declarer names trumps and calls an ace in a side suit. The player with that ace becomes the partner, but may not reveal this. The partnerships only become clear during play when the called ace appears. In a Tournee, the cat determines trumps (see above). In a Good, clubs are trumps, in a Strong, spades are trumps and in a Sans there are no trumps. In a Half, the partner calls trumps (and is thus revealed immediately) in a suit other than that of the called ace. If the called ace is in the cat, the declarer plays alone and, in a Half, has to name trumps. A player with all 4 aces or all 3 side suit aces, calls a king.

Once trumps and the called ace are determined, the declarer may exchange 3 cards with the cat or choose not to exchange. If the declarer opts not to exchange, the next player has the option and so on in turn. The declarer must exchange in a Tournee.

=== Play ===
Forehand leads to the first trick with any card bar a Joker. Players must follow suit if able, otherwise may play any card. If a Joker is led to any trick after the first, it takes the trick, even if another Joker is played to it. The called ace must be played the first time its suit is led. The trick is won in order by a) a Joker if led, b) the highest trump played or c) the highest card of the led suit. The trick winner leads to the next trick.

=== Scoring ===
Scoring systems vary and may be complex. A simple system is as follows:

7 - 10 points 8 - 20 points 9 - 40 points 10 - 80 points 11 - 160 points 12 - 320 points 13 - 640 points Each overtrick - same number of points as the bid e.g. calling "8" and taking 10 tricks scores 60 points. Each attachment = x 2 Playing alone = x 3 Solo - 50 points Nolo - 100 points Open Solo - 150 points Open Nolo - 200 points

The points are paid by the losers to the winner(s). A declarer who loses any Nolo contract pays double.
