= Minnesota whist =

- Origin: Scandinavian immigrants of Minnesota
- Type: trick-taking
- Players: 4, in partnerships
- Cards: 52
- Deck: Anglo-American
- Rank (high→low): A K Q J 10 9 8 7 6 5 4 3 2
- Play: Clockwise

Related games
- Tuppi, Whist

Minnesota whist is a simplified version of whist in which there are no trumps, and the goal is to take seven or more tricks. Four-handed whist is played with two teams. The players of each team sit opposite each other at the table. One person is elected to keep score. Typically, the scorer's team is labeled as "Us" and the other team labeled as "Them". In this game, the ace is high.

Minnesota whist is also known as Norwegian whist, as it was brought to the Upper Midwest by Norwegian immigrants.

== Order of play ==
1. Everyone cuts the deck and high card is dealer.
2. Cards are dealt one at a time starting with the person to the left of the dealer and moving clockwise until all cards are dealt. Each person should have 13 cards.
3. Each person analyzes his/her hand and determines whether to "pass" or "grand". If a player wants to "grand" (play high), he lays down an undistinguished black card; otherwise, he lays a red card.
4. After all 4 players have laid down their cards, players flip up their cards in turn, starting with the person just left of the dealer.
5. As soon as a black card is flipped up, nobody else has to flip their card up.
6. If any cards are black (called a "Grand Hand"), the goal is to take as many tricks (at least 7) as possible.
7. If all cards are red (sometimes called a "Nula Hand"), the goal is to take as few tricks (6 or fewer) as possible.
8. Play begins with the person to the right of the person who granded or, if playing low, the person to the left of the dealer.

== Taking tricks ==
The person who leads lays down a card from his/her hand. Everyone must follow suit if they can. If a player cannot, he lays down any other card. The highest card of the lead suit takes the trick. Whoever takes the trick leads the next one. Every team pools their tricks, so only one player from each team needs to collect the winning tricks. Play continues until all cards are gone. The dealer moves one to the left.

== Scoring ==
If the goal is to lose tricks, the team gets a point for every trick under 7 total. If the goal is to win tricks, the team gets a point for every trick over 6 total if the team granded, or 2 points for every trick over 6 total if the opposing team granded.

The game continues until one team reaches a pre-designated point total, typically 13.

=== Scoring samples ===
- Us: Granded, got 10 tricks
- Them: got 3 tricks
- High game, "Us" makes 4 points (10 - 6)
- Us: Granded, got 5 tricks
- Them: got 8 tricks
- High game, "Them" makes 4 points (8 - 6) x 2
- Us: got 9 tricks
- Them: got 4 tricks
- Low game, "Them" makes 3 points (7 - 4)

== Variations from whist ==
- There is no trump suit
- No cards are laid down after the hands are dealt; each player instead has the option to either pass or grand. If everybody passes, the hand is played as low, like in the main rules.
- If a player grands, then the player to the right of the player who grands leads the first trick.

== See also ==
- Tuppi is a similar game played in Northern Finland.
