= Israeli whist =

Card game

Israeli Whist is a four player card game. It is a variation of the classical Whist, that evolved among Israeli IDF soldiers in the nineteen eighties, and is still popular among soldiers and travelers. In Israel, it is simply known as "whist".

== Rules of the game ==
=== Ranking of the cards in whist ===
The cards are ranked by number and suit.

- The ranking by number, from strong to weak: A, K, Q, J, 10, 9,..., 3, 2
- The ranking by suit, from strong to weak: NT (No Trump), ♠, ♥, ♦, ♣.

=== Dealing of the cards ===
A round begins by dealing out all the cards (without jokers) to four players. The dealer is switched every round in a clockwise direction, so that the player to the left of the current dealer is the next dealer. Each player receives 13 cards that remain hidden from the other players.

=== Bidding ===
In Israeli whist there are two rounds of bidding: a round to determine the trump suit and a round to determine the contract.

==== The bidding that determines the trump suit ====
1. After the dealing of the cards, the player sitting to the left of the dealer "calls". He can choose one of two options: Say "pass", or to bid. Bidding includes the number of future tricks (contract) given a certain trump suit. The bid has to be at least 5 of a certain suit or no suit. For example: "5 hearts" means "If the trump is hearts, I will contract at least 5 tricks". The minimal bid at this point is 5, in other words, if a player will not obligate himself to take at least 5 tricks, he will say "pass".
2. Next, the player to the left of the previous "caller" makes his "call". He can say "pass", or bid higher than the highest bid so far. A higher bid can be stronger in suit (for example 5♠ is stronger than 5♦), or in number (6♥ is stronger than 5♠).
3. The "calling" continues in a clockwise direction.
4. The bid that determines the trump is the one that after it there are three "passes" in a row. Meaning, all the other players declare that they do not want bid higher. At this point the trump suit is determined.

An interesting thing happens when all four players say "pass". In this situation, there is a "Frisch" round.

- "Frisch"

In a Frisch round, every player passes three cards to the player to his left. The cards are laid on the table facing down, and a player may pick up the cards given to him, only after he passed his three cards. After a Frisch round there is another bidding to determine the trump suit, only now the minimal bid is 6 instead of 5. There can be 3 Frisch rounds, and after each one, the minimal bid increases by one. If after three Frisch rounds there is still no bidding, the round is canceled and the cards are shuffled and dealt again.

The word "Frisch" originates from the German word for "fresh". This round is sometimes called "Goulash", which is borrowed from the informal bridge term Goulash deal.

==== The bidding that determines the contract ====
After the trump suit is determined, there is another bidding round in which the "contracts" are determined – that is, the number of tricks a player declares he will take. The first to bid is the winner of the previous bidding (that determined the trump suit). In his bid, he says the number of tricks he will win; the number of tricks must be at least the number he declared in the previous bidding round. Next bids the player to his left, who can bid as many as s/he likes (between 0 and 13), and so do the other two in turn. The last player to bid is not allowed to make a bid that makes the sum of all four bids 13, because then all four players might be able to succeed in the round. So the last player to bid usually determines if the sum is more than 13 (an "over" game) or less than 13 (an "under": game). The meaning is that at least one player will not take enough tricks in an "over" game, or will take too many in an "under" game.

=== A Game Round ===
After all the cards are dealt and the trump and the contracts established, there are 13 game rounds, in which each player puts down a card and the player that puts down the strongest card takes the trick.

==== Putting down the cards ====
In the first game round, the first to put down a card is the winner of the first bid, next is the player to his left, and so on. In the subsequent rounds, the winner of the previous round plays first. The first player of the round is allowed to put down any of his cards and all the other players must follow suit (put down cards of the same suit). If a player doesn't have cards of the same suit, he may put down any other card that he has. If a player does have cards of the same suit, but puts down cards of another suit, and is later caught (he will have to put down all his cards eventually) he is fined 100 points. If a player doesn't have cards of the same suit, he may put down a card that is not of the trump suit, and then he surely loses the trick, or he may "cut" (put down a trump card).

==== Who takes the trick ====
After all four cards have been put down, the winner of the trick is determined, the highest card of the suit that started the round wins, unless trump cards are put down, and in that case, the strongest trump wins. The player to win the trick is the one to start the next round. When playing with no trump (NT), the rules are the same, only there is no option to cut, so a player that does not have the leading suit loses the trick for sure.

==== Example of a game round ====
An example round (diamond is trump): player A leads with a 9♣, player B Q♣, Player C 7♦, player D 8♣. Notice that player C has no clubs, or else he would have to put down a club, so he has two options: to get rid of a card that is not trump, or to try to win the trick with a trump. Player D had clubs, so he had to put down a club and could not put down a trump, and so Player C wins the trick.

== Scoring ==
The object of the game is to win the exact number of tricks in the contract, no more and no fewer.

- If a player makes his contract (with zero as the exception), he receives the number of tricks squared plus ten. For example, a player that contracted three and took three tricks will get 19 points (3*3+10=19).
- If a player does not make his contract (with zero as the exception), he gets minus ten points for each deviation (too many or too few) from his contract. Therefore, if a player bids 4 and wins 6, he loses 20 points.
- A player that bids zero and makes it, receives 50 points in an "under" game (the sum of bids is less than 13) and 25 in an "over" game (the sum of bids is more than 13).
- A player that bids zero and does not make it, loses 50 points if he wins one trick. If he wins more than one trick, for each additional trick he won, he receives 10 points. So a player who bids zero and wins one will get –50 points, and if he wins 2, he will get –40 points. Therefore, having bid zero and winning one trick, that player will want to win as many more additional tricks as he can.

== Variations ==
- A three-player game can be played in three ways:
  1. take out a suit from the pack.
  2. take out all the cards numbering 2, 3, 4 and 5.
  3. take out one random card each round. each player gets 17 cards.
- No frisch
- No raising the minimum bid in a frisch
- The first frisch is counter-clockwise (to the left), the second is to the player across the table, and the third to the right.
