= German whist =

Card game

- Origin: Britain
- Type: Plain-trick game
- Players: 2
- Cards: 52
- Deck: French
- Rank (high→low): A K Q J 10 9 8 7 6 5 4 3 2
- Play: Alternate
- Playing time: 15 min

Related games
- Whist

German whist is a variant of classic whist for two players in which the reward for winning the first 13 tricks is to add a particular card to your hand. Also called Chinese whist, it is probably of British origin.

There are several variations of this game, the most important difference between them being whether all 26 tricks count or only the last 13. The game is a skillful one, as in the second half both players can calculate exactly which 13 cards the opponent has, and plan their play based on that knowledge.

== Name ==
As well as German whist, the game goes under a variety of other names including Chinese whist and honeymoon whist. In Sweden the game is sometimes known as hamburger whist after the German city of Hamburg, not to be confused with humbug whist (humbugwhist) which is a Swedish two-hand whist played with two blinds which may be exchanged by the players at the start of a hand.

== History ==
German whist is a specific two-hand game that appears to originate in England. It should not be confused with the term "German whist" which is used generically to describe the culture and tactics of whist in Germany and also to describe whist packs sold in Germany. (Note: See for example the "luxury" cards for sale in Lemcke's Illustrated Grammar of Skat.) For example, Alexander Stephens in Johnson's Cyclopædia uses it to describe a four-hand variant of whist that was current in Germany in the late 19th century, (Note: In this version, game was 10 points excluding honours. The dealer's partner determined trump or passed the privilege to the left-hand opponent. The side making trump had to make one trick above the book; otherwise their opponents scored two for each trick they made over the book.) while "Portland" uses it to refer to the "bolder" way the Germans played whist compared with those in Britain.

The specifically two-hand game of German whist was apparently popular "at Vienna among the diplomats" in the late 19th century. Its rules are recorded as early as 1894 in the London periodical, Home Notes, in which the winner is the one who takes the majority of the 26 tricks, scoring in points their difference in tricks. Three years later, it appears in America in R.F. Foster's Encyclopedia of Games.

== Rules ==
=== Players and cards ===
German whist is a two player game using a standard pack of 52 cards ranked A (high) K Q J 10 9 8 7 6 5 4 3 2 (low) in each suit.

=== The deal ===
The initial dealer is chosen by cutting the pack, and the turn to deal alternates after each hand. The dealer offers the pack to the non-dealer for cutting before dealing 13 cards, one at a time, non-dealer receiving first. The twenty-seventh card is placed face-up on the talon, i.e. the face-down pack. The suit of this first upcard becomes the trump suit for the entire hand.

=== The play ===
The non-dealer chooses any card to play for the first trick and the other player must follow suit if able. If both cards are the same suit then the higher card wins. If they are of different suits the first player wins unless the second player played a trump to a side suit card, in which case the trump wins.

In the first stage of the game, the winner of each trick takes the face-up card and adds it to his or her hand, the loser then takes the face-down card below it without showing it to the opponent. The next card in the pack is then turned over and the winner plays first in the next trick. Thus the winner of the trick always gets a card known to the loser, while the loser of a trick receives a card unknown to the winner. The face-up card on the Talon has no part in the play of each trick. Each player stays with 13 cards in hand until the pack is exhausted.

The second stage now begins, in which the remaining 13 tricks are played without replenishment until the cards in both players hands are exhausted. In this second stage of the game, won tricks are kept in front of the player who won them.

Whoever wins the most tricks in the second stage wins the game.

The game is "usually played for so much a point", the player with the majority of tricks receiving the difference between the number of his tricks and those of his adversary. Each hand is a separate game.

== Variations ==
In another version of the game the 27th card indicates whether the second stage of the game is to be played low or high. A black card means that the players should try to take as few tricks as possible, whereas a red card means they should try to take as many as possible.

One version of scoring is for the score count to begin at the 7th trick taken in the second stage. For instance in a high game 10 vs 3 cards gives 4 points to the one who took 10 tricks. If it was a low game, the 4 points goes to the other player.

Another variation is for all 26 tricks to be scored. This results in a score which is more affected by luck.

== Strategy ==
Although not all cards are shown (played or captured from the pack) after the first half of the game it is now possible to find out exactly which cards the other player has. The opponents cards are those which are not in the player's own hand and which have not been seen during the first half. It is no exaggeration to state that a significantly better player will always win, if not every hand at least most hands, independently of which cards the players randomly received in the initial deal.

The strategy for the two variants, in the first stage, is slightly different. In the first variant the player must balance winning the current trick against the probability of winning future tricks.

In the second variant the player must try to assemble the best possible hand for the endgame. This is however not as simple as it might appear. Assume hearts is trump and you begin the foreplay. You have four low hearts in your hand, but also several high-value spades, and the top card of the deck is the two of clubs. Now despite a "worthless" card to play for, playing one's highest trump might reveal the trump situation on the opponent's hand, and you will indeed reduce the numbers of trumps (which is not your strong suit), and finally, if the opponent plays a lower trump you will know that the opponent may have a large number of trumps (which is not the case if the opponent needs to play another suit) finally by "winning" the two of clubs, you will keep the advantage of deciding which suit is played next. In general it is a good idea to attempt to keep the lead, but not always at any cost.

Playing a card of same value as the card to play for is often good, when it comes to middle-value cards, such as 7 to 10, but even more important is to choose the suit wisely. It is also important remember that when the ace is gone, the king becomes the highest value card, and if the three top value cards in a suit are gone, then the jack is the highest card in that suit, etc. Also the lowest cards are important to know, especially when the play is low. The real "key" is however to know which suit to play, in order also to win lower-value cards, though not by playing too good a card from you hand. Do not focus so much on a bad card at the top of the deck, rather think of the suit to play. If the card to play for is one you wish to have, play a safe card. If the card to play for is a middle-value card, play a slightly higher card, but just enough high for the opponent to have difficulties to "come in".

When an ace is gone, the king becomes the highest card in the suit, etc. Try to remember which card is currently the highest in each suit. Count especially trumps. But don't be afraid to play trump, as long as it is likely your opponent actually also has trump. (If it is in your interest that the number of trump cards is reduced in the endgame especially) In "low" games try to build up long suits from the bottom. For example, 2-4-6-8-Q-K-A is a good sequence to have in a low endgame. Even better is 2-3-5-7-Q-K-A, from which you can give the lead to the opponent, provided at least one card of the same suit exists on the opponent's hand. But first play all single high cards as soon as possible. When playing low, it is very easy to get trapped and having to take all the last ten tricks due to a miscalculation. The twos are often more important than aces in high or trump games. (And as soon as a "deuce" vanishes in the foreplay, the three takes its place and so on.)

By counting every suit and the highest known card in every suit one may more easily determine which card one's opponent has (or close enough), when the endgame begins. Then you also know the best way to play the endgame cards. With exception of when playing low, the endgame is close to the playing part of bridge.

== Humbug whist ==
Humbug whist (Swedish: humbugwhist) is a Swedish two-hand form of traditional whist. The cards are dealt to four hands. The last card is turned face up and indicates the trump suit. Each player must choose between keeping the hand dealt or discarding it and picking up one of the blind hands instead. Play is as per normal whist and points are awarded for each trick won over the first six. The traditional whist scoring system is used.

== Bibliography ==
- _ (1894) "Card Games. - German Whist." under "Home Amusements" in Home Notes, No. 50, Vol. IV, 29 December 1894. London: C. Arthur Pearson. p. 678.
- Doyle, Deborah, ed. (2000). Hoyle's Official Rules of Card Games. Australia: Redwood Editions. ISBN 1-86515-153-X
- Foster, R.F. (1897). Foster's Encyclopedia of Games. 8th edn. New York: Frederick A. Stokes.
- Lembcke, Ernst Eduard (1887). An Illustrated Grammar of Skat: The German Game of Cards. New York: Westermann.
- "Not Ungrateful" (1901). "German Whist" in Country Life Illustrated, Vol. IX, No. 212 (26 January 1901). p. 127.
- "Portland", ed. (1894). The Whist Table: A Treasury of Notes on the Royal Game. New York: Charles Scribner's Sons.
- Rheinhardt, Rudolf (1887). Whist Scores and Card-table Talk: With a Bibliography of Whist. Chicago: A.C. McClurg.
