= Court piece =

Trick-taking card game

- Origin: Iran; also India, Pakistan, (also popular in South Asia, Suriname, Netherlands)
- Players: 2×2
- Cards: 52
- Deck: French
- Rank (high→low): A K Q J 10 9 8 7 6 5 4 3 2
- Play: Counter-clockwise (mostly)

Related games
- Whist, Shelem

Court piece (also known as Hokm (Persian: حکم), Rung (Urdu:رنگ) and Rang) is a trick-taking card game similar to the card game whist in which eldest hand makes trumps after the first five cards have been dealt, and trick-play is typically stopped after one party has won seven tricks. A bonus is awarded if one party wins the first seven tricks, or even all tricks. The game is played by four players in two teams, but there are also adaptations for two or three players.

Derived games have removed the special role of eldest hand or have added features such as the 2 of hearts as the highest trump (satat), the need to win two consecutive tricks in order to pick up tricks (double sar), or counting tens rather than tricks (dehla pakad).

The game appears to originate from Iran or India. In the Indian subcontinent, it is sometimes spelled Coat Peace, Kot Pees, Chokri, Chakri, Rung or Rang. Alternative names include Seven Hands (Iran), t'rup Chaal, and Hok (Israel). In the Dutch-speaking world, a similar game (and likely derivative) is known as Troefcall (Suriname and the Netherlands). In English the game is sometimes referred to simply as Trumps. As Satat, it is the most popular card game of Mauritius.

== Basic rules ==
The game is played with a full standard deck of 52 cards by four players in fixed partnerships, sitting crosswise. Cards are dealt in batches of 5–3–3–2 or 5–4–2-2 or 5–4–4 .

The trump can be changed if a certain person from another team is not satisfied with trump. If so they have to make seven in a row or a court. But this can't be changed by the person who announced trump or their partner The player who sits after the dealer in the direction of play (which is typically counter-clockwise) is known as trump-caller. Having received the first five cards, this player announces the trump suit (usually called rang of the game - "rang" meaning "color" in Persian or hokm - "hokm" meaning "rule" in Persian). The other players are not allowed to look at their cards before the trump suit has been announced. The trump-caller leads to the first trick. In trick-play the normal whist rules apply: Players must follow suit if possible, and the highest trump, or the highest card of the suit led, takes the trick. To choose the highest card, the cards must be 10 and below. The winner of a trick leads to the next trick.

The party that wins seven or more tricks wins the hand and will usually stop the game at this point. Winning seven tricks in one go is a special achievement known as kot or kap. Player have to call first for Continuing afterwards and winning all tricks is a rare achievement known as a bavney or baunie. The Under-ten rule, if the trump-caller not holding any face card may call for re-deal when the first 5 cards are dealt. If a player has no face cards when all the cards are dealt, they may call for re-deal.

The first trump-caller (and by implication the first dealer) is determined at random. The role of the trump-caller only passes on to the next player if the trump-caller's party did not win the hand.

No talking/communication between the team members is allowed in this game. If a player talks to their teammate then that suite belongs to the opponent.

There is a variation played only in North India, specially Delhi, where the only way one team member can communicate with the other, is by tapping the table (or any surface) called a 'thaap' intended to indicate to the team member to repeat the colour just played. This variation should be clarified before starting the game.

== Scoring ==
In a simple scoring variant used in Iran, the winning party scores 1 point if the other team also won a trick, or 2 points for kot, or 3 points for hâkem koti, i.e. a kot achieved by the opponents of trump-caller.

A scoring variant used in the Netherlands assigns 2 points to a simple win, 5 points to a kap and 15 points to a baunie. To score the 5 points for kap, the player who wins the seventh trick (but not their partner) must stop the game at that point. If a party goes for baunie but loses a later trick, then it is only a single win of 2 points.

A scoring variant popular in India and Pakistan counts kots. Winning seven consecutive hands (none of which is a kot) is equivalent to a kot. A single bavney counts as 52 kots. Each time the trump-caller's party scores a kot, the trump-caller's partner becomes trump-caller.

== Minor variations and common games of Rang ==
Sometimes the direction of play is clockwise.

Instead of fixed partnerships, the partnerships may also be determined randomly. In this case the seating arrangement may have to be adjusted so that the players sit crosswise.

After all cards have been dealt, it may happen that trump-caller does not hold a single court card. In this case trump-caller may be allowed to announce a redeal. In another variation, trump-caller may call for a redeal if there is not court card among their first five cards, but may not do so more than twice in a row. Trump-caller's partner may also be allowed to announce that they do not hold a trump and suggest a redeal. The redeal only happens if trump-caller agrees.

Instead of making trumps, the trump-caller may be allowed to opt for a different procedure. In this case, trump-caller or dealer will turn up one of the remaining eight cards dealt to trump-caller for trumps, without looking at it first.

A party that fails to stop the play of the hand after winning the first seven tricks, but does not win all tricks, may score only a simple win of the hand rather than a kot. In this case, only the player who wins the seventh trick may have the right to stop the hand. The person showing his trumps should have the greatest card of Rang to win the trick.

In Pakistan and India, Rang is played with a lot of variations, all of them are based on rang, but categorized from simple to complex in the following order: In some regions, the opponent can change the trump if they think they can win seven tricks in it. But if they fail to win seven tricks in a row, then it is called anti kot.

=== Single Sar ===
Single Sar is the easiest game of the Rang. Basic rules of the Rang are applied to this game as well, i.e., 52 cards deck, four players in fixed partnership, etc. (Only beginners play this). The cards are dealt in batches of 5-4-4, the trump-caller announces the Rang (trump suit) and starts the game with first trick. All of the players have to follow the suit (if possible), one with the highest-ranked card takes the trick (One trick is called one sar, (Urdu: سر)). If any of the player does not have the suit of the trick, he can play card from trump-suit (rang), often referred to as kaat lagana (Urdu: کاٹ لگانا). This word kaat lagana is Urdu and/or Hindi translation of cutting something, which herein implies cutting of running trick. The player/team with the highest Kaat takes the trick.

At the end, the team with more winning tricks wins the game. If trump-caller's team remains the winner, the same dealer deals the cards again. On the other hand, if the dealing team takes more tricks, the deal is forwarded to the next player (counter clock-wise), that is, the trump-caller in previous game.

=== Double Sar ===
Double sar or double siri, also referred to as double rang or double rung, is the most commonly played game in India and Pakistan. It is a variant of Single Sar in which tricks are not automatically collected by their winner's party. Instead they form a heap in the middle between the players until one player (not one partnership) wins two consecutive tricks, thereby winning the entire heap for their partnership. Basic rules of the Rang are applied to Double Sar as well. The winner of the last trick always picks up whatever remains in the heap at that point. Usually, the first collection of heap requires three tricks or five tricks must have been played already. Some variations of double sar forbid collecting the heap when a certain common game situation occurs, such as winning the first two tricks or winning two consecutive tricks with aces.

Scoring is by kots and grand-kots. In this game a kot is defined as collecting all tricks by trump-caller team, which unlike bavney in standard court piece is realistically achievable. A grand-kot or goon-kot is defined as collection of all tricks (sars, (Urdu: سریں)) by the dealing team. A goon-kot counts triple (or ten-fold).

The decision of dealer for the first time is chosen randomly or toss using the deck. For every next turn, the result of the current game decides the dealer as well. In case of kot the next dealer is the opposite player of losing team. In case of grand-kot, the next dealer is the trump-caller. In all other cases, the team with less tricks (sars) deals the cards. The same player deals if the dealing team remains unable to win seven or more sars. The dealing is termed as pees, and considered to be hard work.

Winning seven hands in a row by collecting the majority of tricks is sometimes equivalent to a kot. The game is popular in India and Pakistan. Sar literally means head, but in this context refers to a trick.

=== Dummy Rang ===
Dummy Rang, mostly referred to as Dummy only, is a variant of Double Sir, which is played between three players instead of four as in common rang games. The fourth player is a dummy player, that is why this game is termed as Dummy. In every game, the dummy player is set to be the partner of one player, rotated counter clock-wise. The cards of the fourth player are placed face-up position, and partner of the dummy player is responsible of dummy's turn.

Scoring is based on number of sars (tricks), it is counted for each individual player. One match ends when score reaches to 104.

=== Dabba Rang ===
Dabba Rang is a complex, logical and interesting game of the rang. Unlike 'khula rung' (open rung), each player announces the number of 'sars' (rounds) he would pick or win, the trump or 'rung' suit is not revealed rather a card from that suit is placed face down somewhere by the player who announces the highest number of sars, the rest of the game is the same except no one wins a sar unless the trump suit is revealed by the elimination of a suit from the other team's hand. The opposing player claims that he is out of specific color suit that's being played and demands hidden suit be revealed. There are variations where opposing team can either cut or let go and cut later the ongoing suit. Thus the primary objective of the other team is to reveal the trump suite asap and that of the boss team is to keep it concealed. If the number of sars previously declared is picked up, the game is won. Some players like to allow the rule of using two aces at same time to get the declared number of "Sars".

=== Be-Ranga Double Sir (Blind Rang) ===
Be-Ranga Double Sir or Blind Rang is the most complex and logical variation. In this format, the dealer distributes all 52 cards without the trump being called and the game begins. During game whoever runs out from a specific suit will make trump by throwing colour card. No body will win trick until the trump is made. After the trump is made, any player has to make double sar in order to win tricks.

== Closely related games ==
=== Satat ===
Satat, the most popular game of Mauritius, differs from court piece only in the special role assigned to the 2 of hearts and the existence of a system of signals for the exchange of information between partners.

In this game the 2 of hearts is the highest trump. It may always be used to trump a trick, even if its owner still holds cards of the suit led. A player who holds the 2 of hearts but no other trumps need not follow suit when trumps is led.

There is no fixed scoring system. Once all cards have been dealt again after a kot, each of the losing partners must pass a trump (or if they do not hold a trump their highest-ranking card) to their right neighbour, who simultaneously passes them an unwanted card. However, the 2 of hearts need not be passed, and neither of the players who won the kot may use this opportunity to rid themselves entirely of a plain suit. The same principle applies after a bavney, except that in that case each player passes on two cards.

=== Trup kasiet ===
Trup kasiet is a satat variant in which the trump-caller makes trumps secretly by putting a card face down. Until it is clear which suit is trumps, trump-caller must announce after each trick who won it. When the 2 of hearts is played before the trump suit is known, players may play any card. Since kot and bavney are more common in this variant, no cards are passed in the following hand.

=== Dehla Pakad or Mindi ===
Dehla pakad is double sar with the further variation that tens are counted instead of tricks. A kot is achieved when a party wins all four tens in tricks or if it wins seven consecutive hands by collecting three tens in each. If a team takes all 4 tens in a hand, they win one Kot. The turn to deal passes to the right if the dealing team won and to the dealer's partner if the non-dealing team won. If non dealer's team takes 1, 2 or 3 tens, they win the hand and the same dealer deals again. If the dealer's team took 4 tens, they win the hand and the turn to deal passes to the right and the kot is removed.

== Court piece variants with no trump-caller ==
Double sar and dehla pakad have developed variants which lack the special role of the trump-caller – otherwise a defining feature of court piece and its variants. The game begins without trumps, and the first player who cannot follow suit determines the trump suit with the card he or she plays. The heap cannot be picked up before the trump suit has been determined.

In a variant described for dehla pakad, trick-play begins after the first five cards have been dealt. The first player who cannot follow suit determines the trump suit with the card played. This is the earliest chance to pick up the heap. At this point the remaining cards are dealt, potentially making it unverifiable that the player was in fact unable to follow suit. Therefore, this game requires honest players. In the event that all players were able to follow suit in the first five tricks, a random card is drawn from the heap.

In be-ranga double sar, the game begins after all cards have been dealt. The heap cannot be picked up before the subsequent trick after the trump suit has been determined.

== Adaptations for fewer than four players ==
In Iran, two- and three-player variants of this popular game are documented. For the three-player game, one of the 2s is removed, resulting in a pack of 51 cards. The cards are dealt in batches of 5–4–4–4. A round is stopped as soon as one player has won more tricks than any of the opponents would have if they won all the remaining tricks. (For example, the game is over at 7–4–4 tricks, but not at 8–3–1.) If a player wins the first 7 tricks, the round is also stopped and the player wins 2 points (eldest hand) or 3 points (opposing player).

In the two-player game, only 5 cards are dealt to each player. After eldest hand has declared trumps, they discard 3 cards face down and the opponent discards 2. Starting with the eldest hand players alternate drawing single cards from the stock until they have 13 cards each. Any card drawn may be discarded face down and replaced by the next card from the stock, which must then be kept. If the first card is kept the second one is seen then discarded.

== Terminology ==
rang, rung, hokm, troef
Trumps..
trump-caller, caller, hâkem
Eldest hand, i.e. the player who sits after the dealer and leads to the first trick. This player also determines the trump suit.
kot, court, coat, kap
Winning the first seven tricks in a hand. In some scoring variants winning seven hands in a row is also a kot.
t'rup chaal
Leading a trump to the first trick.
rafeh koti
Playing a high card to the first trick in an attempt to prevent the opponents from scoring a kot.
goolah kot, goon kot, hâkem koti
A kot won against trump-caller's party.
Teerwah, bavney, baunie
When all 13 hands are won by a single team only. It is done by Calling the First Kot, then giving a First kot and then winning team can see each others cards, and they decide whether they can give teerwah or not .

== Geographical distribution and naming ==
The game appears to originate in Iran, India and Pakistan, where it is known under several names. Court, coat or kot apparently stands for the achievement in the game, and pees is a Hindi word for to deal. In the alternative name seven hands, hands is Indian English for tricks.

The game is popular amongst the Gujarati diaspora, particularly in East Africa, the UK and Canada who refer to the game as chokri or chakri (of which a six player variation is also played).

Immigrants from the Indian subcontinent brought the game to Suriname and Guyana, where it is known as troefcall ("trumps call", a mixture of Dutch and English) and t'rup chaal. From Suriname it found its way to the Netherlands. Under the name hokm (Persian: حُکْم, trumps) it is very popular in Iran.

Satat is the most popular game in Mauritius, a group of islands whose majority population is of Indian descent. The name of the game is derived from saat hant, Hindi for seven hands.
