= Whist marker =

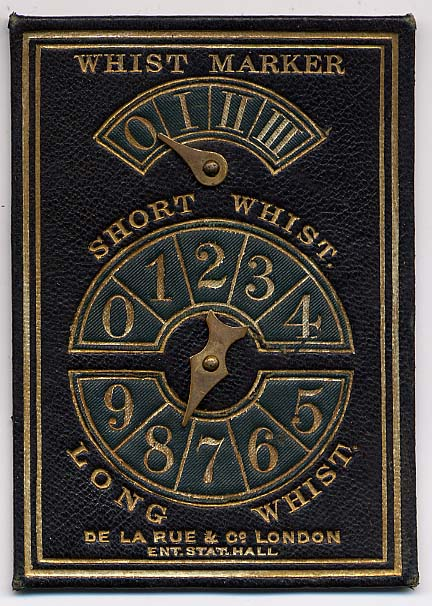
A nineteenth-century long and short whist marker by De La Rue

A whist marker is a device for recording the current score in the game of whist.

Whist markers generally come in pairs, one for each couple. Whist markers can be broadly divided into three groups:

- Short whist markers
- Long whist markers
- Long and short whist markers.

== Short whist markers ==
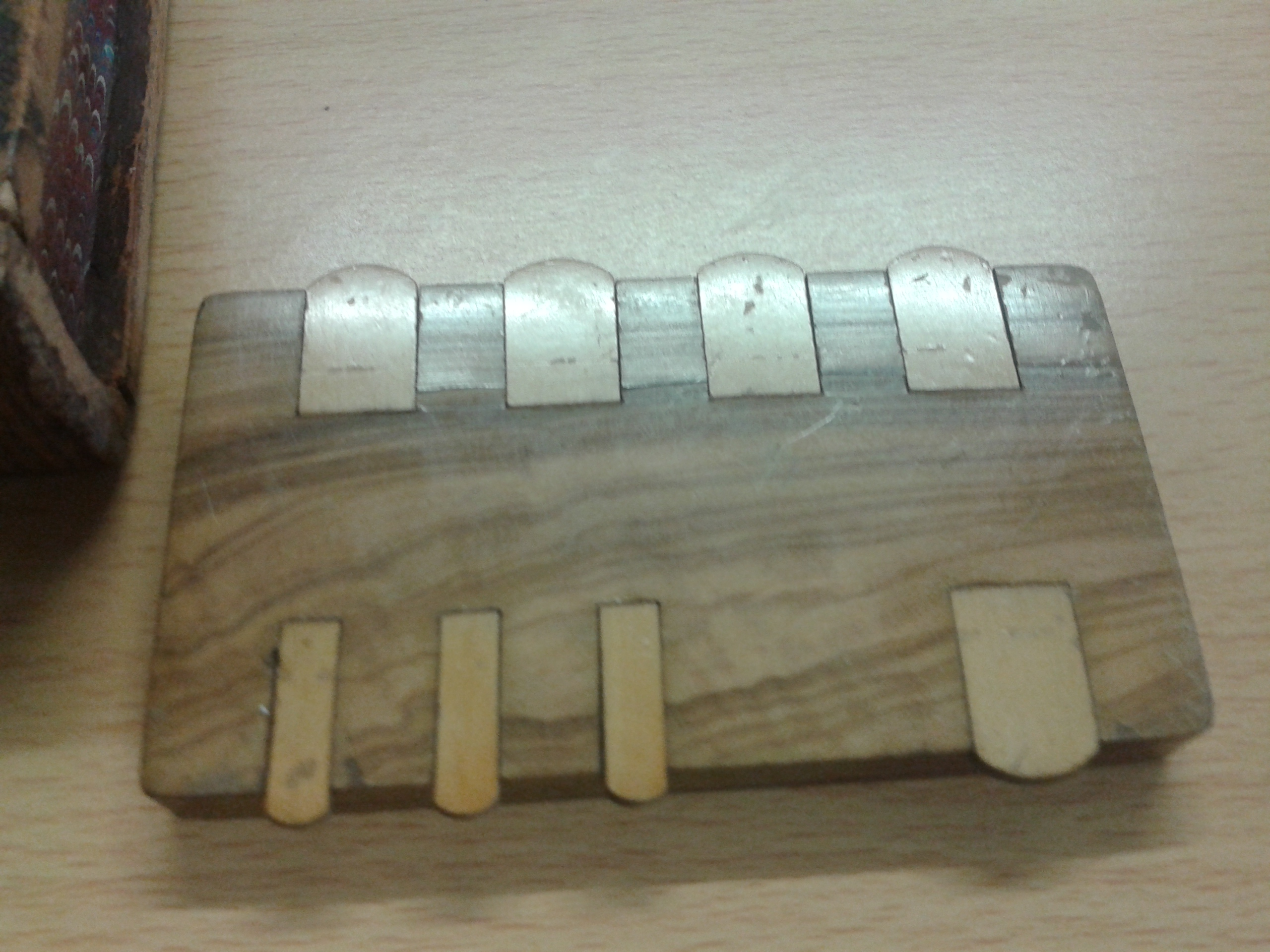
A short whist marker with the flaps closed

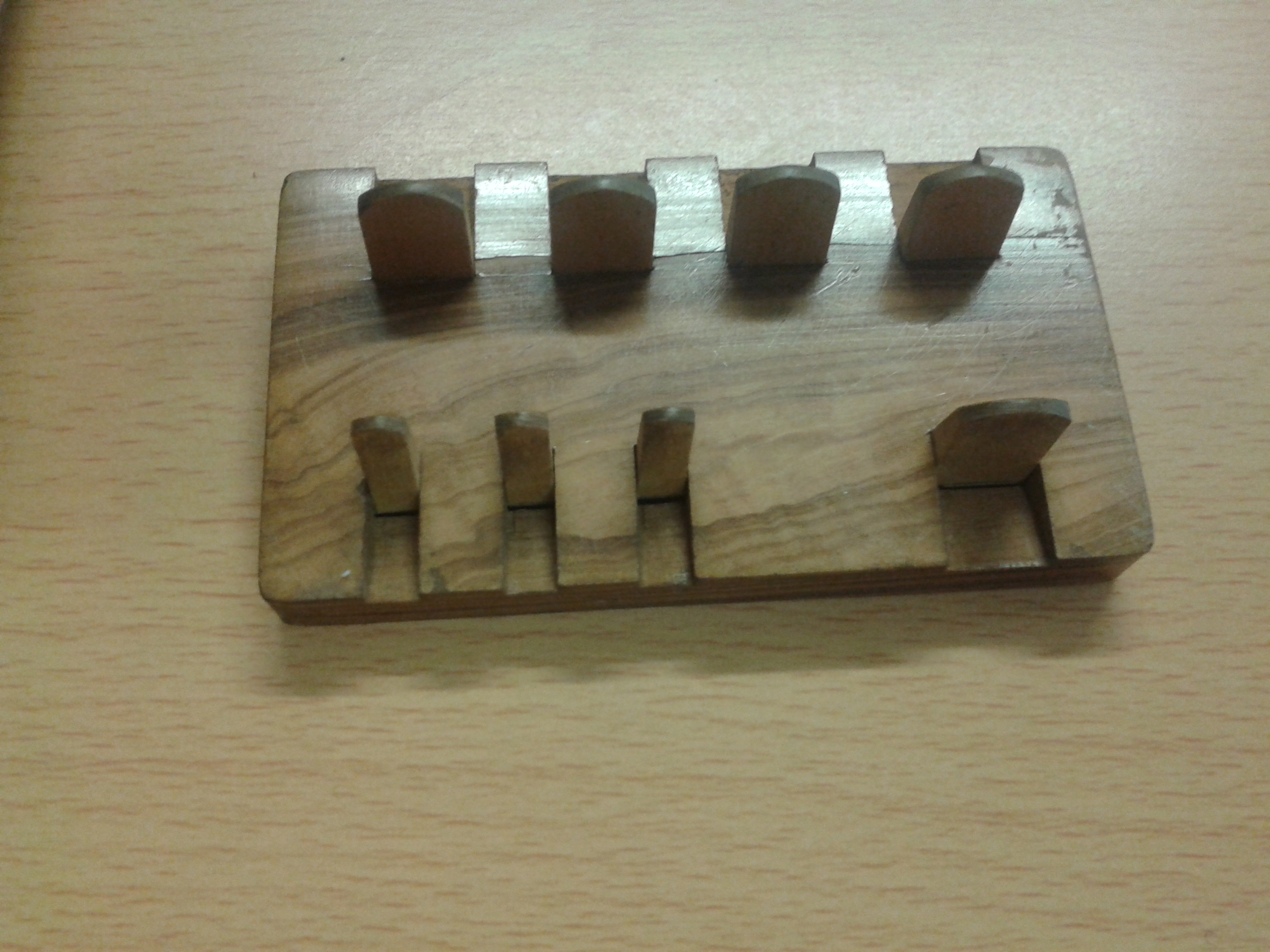
A short whist marker with the flaps open

A short whist marker displays the number of points gained so far in the game, and the number of games gained in the rubber. Short whist overtook long whist in popularity around the middle of the nineteenth century.

Five points win a game and three games win a rubber. The points are for each trick over the book (the first six tricks) in a given deal, and in some games for "honours".

Thus a typical wooden whist marker has five broad flaps, for the points, and three narrow flaps for the number of games won so far.

== Long whist markers ==
Long whist markers are similar, but the number of points in a game is ten, or in some cases a lesser number, greater than five.

== Long and short whist markers ==
These devices are designed to allow scoring for either the long or short game, using the same marker (or pair of markers).
