= Whist with auction =

Polish whist variant with bidding

- Origin: Poland
- Alternative names: Auction Whist
- Players: 4
- Difficulty: relatively high
- Cards: 52

Related games
- vint, contract bridge

Whist with auction (pol. Wist z licytacją) or auction whist (pol. wist licytowany) was a variant of whist with added advanced bridge-like bidding invented and popular in Poland in the second half of the 19th century. The game rose to a very large popularity; however, it was driven out by a very similar and more refined vint.

The game was created as a mix of whist and preferans and was invented around 1858 which makes it perhaps the oldest form of bridge. As for its times the game was very innovative, in some aspects even more than later vint and auction bridge. It required accurate bidding. The game featured some interesting traits like possibility to win auction without rasing contract.

== History ==
The game was described in great detail by an anonymous author writing under the pseudonym Stary Gracz (pol. Old Player) in the book Gry w karty dawniejsze i nowe... Stary Gracz writes that the game was invented by a resident of Warsaw about 30 years prior to that:

This game invented more or less 30 years ago by a great whist's aficionado from Warsaw was until recently very widespread among us, only vint as a "new sieve on the hook" pushed it out of the pedestal of popularity. The game is exactly the same whist according to the rules, there is only a difference in picking the trumps, which needs to be discussed further.

— Stary Gracz, Gry w karty dawniejsze i nowe...

Since the first edition of Gry w karty... was in 1888 this implies that the game was invented more or less in 1858.

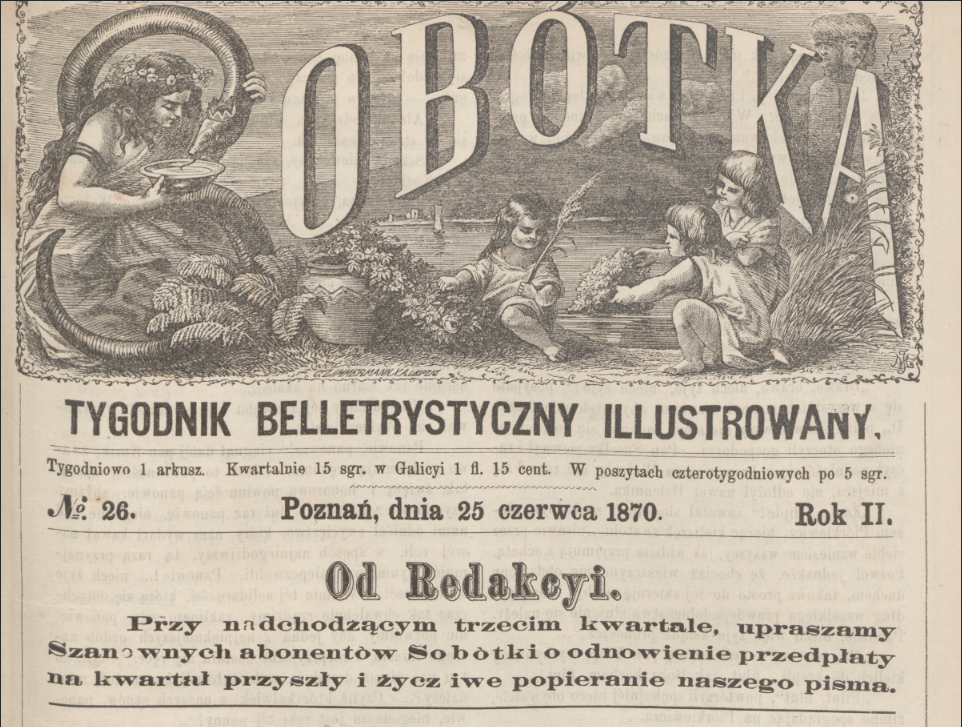
Issue of the magazine Sobótka from 1870 featuring the article Gry mentioning auction whist.

Great popularity of whist with auction is attested in an article from 1870 in the magazine Sobótka from Poznań, titled "Gry" (pol. Games) written by an anonymous author describing and criticizing vogue for card games in the Kingdom of Poland. The author also states that the game was created as a combination of preferans and whist:

Gieryłasz [Polish kind of whist without trump suit] i.e. whist played with decimal score and without a consecrated suit, more gambling than a game of skill, depending on the score, used to assault preferans menacingly, however it emerged victoriously and only whist with auction, a fortunate combination of preferans and whist, disturbed for a moment the success of this card giant. And this happened not so long ago; this new kind of whist drew to itself players so called thinking, which want to make out of game science, a kind of mathematical task. So card players divided themselves into two parties, preferans remaind a game of p r o f i t, whereas whist became a game of m e n t a l e n t e r t a i n m e n t, a kind of card tournament. (...) However we honestly admit that we prefer those whist g e n i u s e s, of whom there were many in those times, than preferans sharks, playing exclusively for win and considering a game a job supposed to provide income.

— Anonymous author, Gry, Tygodnik Sobótka

== Rules ==
=== Auction ===
Game had added advanced bidding by number of tricks and suits plus no trump very similar to that from contemporary bridge. Order of suits was as follows (from the lowest):

♠, ♣, ♦, ♥, no trump.

The minimal contract was 2 i.e. 8 tricks. Players could bid at the level of 1 but if the bidding didn't reach at least the level of 2, cards were redealt. Players couldn't bid after passing. Similarly to vint there were no double and redouble, but players by bidding too high could give the opponents a game (see scoring below).

A very interesting trait of auction whist was that players could keep the contract bid by someone else and become the declarer by bidding "hand":

A player being on hand doesn't bid a new suit, but keeps the one already bid by the last player, another following him goes further.

— Stary Gracz, Gry w karty dawniejsze i nowe...

Auction could look like this (as players couldn't bid after passing the following example given by Stary Gracz doesn't quite make sense):

Player A	Player B	Player C	Player D
1 ♠	1 ♣	1 ♦	pass
hand	1 ♥	1 no trump	—
hand			

In the above example bidding didn't reach the level of 2 and thus no one committed himself to become the declarer.

=== Play ===
Play in auction whist didn't differ from that in whist or bridge. Stary Gracz isn't clear, but it was probably the winner of the bidding who became the declarer, not the partner who first bid the suit of the final contract like in contemporary bridge.

=== Scoring ===
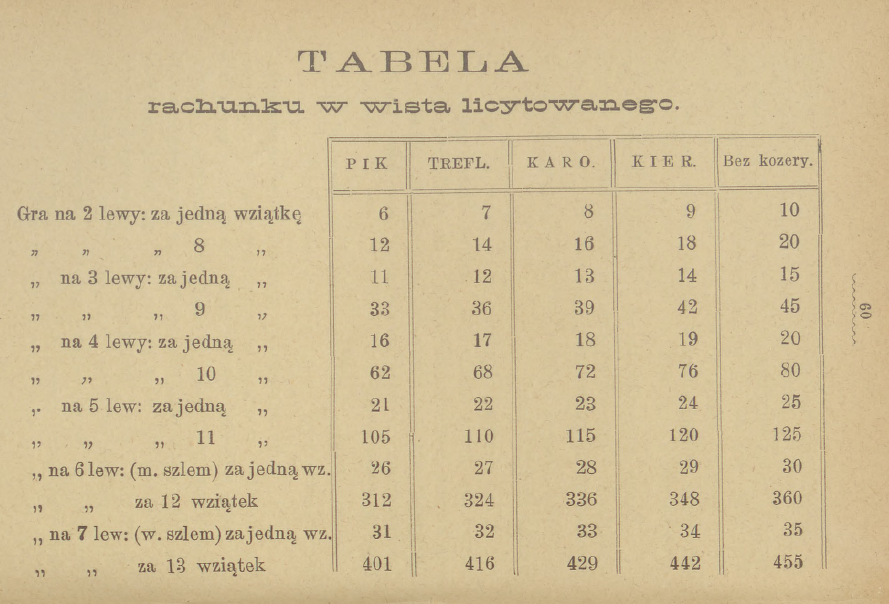
Table with scoring in auction whist published by Stary Gracz. The table contains errors.

Scoring in auction whist was relatively complex. Similarly to bridge bonuses for honors and overtricks were scored above the line and didn't count towards game. Similarly to vint value of tricks depended on the suit and the level of contract. It encouraged a highly accurate bidding which was noted by Stary Gracz:

Thus everything here depends on the accurate bid, because a bid too low or too high causes significant losses.

— Stary Gracz, Gry w karty dawniejsze i nowe...

When the contract failed, opponents scored points for all undertricks below the line and the same amount above the line. 50 pts. were needed for a game.

Stary Gracz doesn't mention bonuses for a game or a rubber but there probably were some, because he orders to follow rules of ordinary whist when in doubt and he did describe various rates of bonuses for a game and a rubber in ordinary whist, including very high, like 10 and 20 values of a trick for a game and a rubber respectively or even 50 and 100.

Value of a trick above 6 tricks is shown in the following table:

Value of tricks above 6 in auction whist
Level of contract	♠	♣	♦	♥	no trump
2	6	7	8	9	10
3	11	12	13	14	15
4	16	17	18	19	20
5	21	22	23	24	25
6	26	27	28	29	30
7	31	32	33	34	35

Examples:

- Players bid 2♥, took 10 tricks. They score 2*9=18 below the line and 2*9=18 above the line.
- Players bid 4♥, took 10 tricks. They score 4*19=76 below the line and make a game.
- Players bid 3♠, took only 6 tricks. Their opponents score 3*11=33 pts. below the line and another 33 pts. above the line.

Stary Gracz seems to contradict himself when it comes to the bonus for slam and small slam, but from the table published by him it follows that the bonus for bid and made slam and small slam was equal to the score for additional 6 tricks.

== Bibliography ==
- Stary Gracz (1888). Gry w karty dawniejsze i nowe...
- "Gry" (PDF). Tygodnik Sobótka. Poznań. 1870. p. 206.
