= Sizette =

French card game

- Enjoyable six-player form of Whist
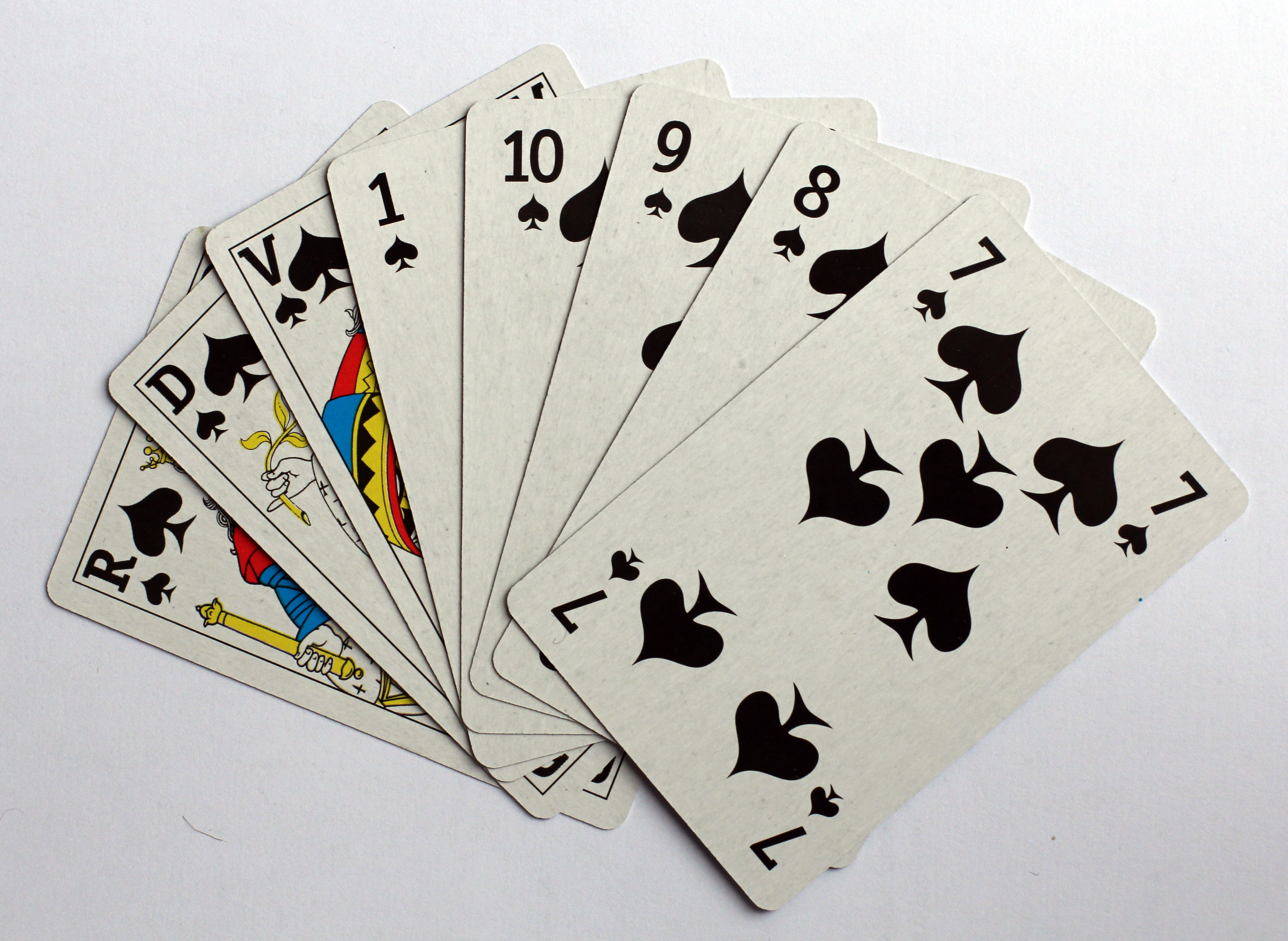
- The suit of Spades from a French pack, ranking as in Sizette
- Origin: France
- Family: Trick-taking
- Players: 6 (2 x 3)
- Cards: 36
- Deck: French pattern
- Rank (high→low): K Q J A 10 9 8 7 6
- Play: Anticlockwise

Related games
- Quadrette (four-player version)

Sizette is an historical French card game for six players in two teams of three. It is unusual in that communication between partners is allowed and the team captain is permitted to ask for information and direct play. It has been described as one of the most enjoyable games of cards, albeit one requiring skill to play well. It is a form of Whist for six players.

== History ==
The name Sizette refers to the fact that it is played by six players. It was first recorded in 1725 in the Académie Universelle des Jeux when it was said to be little known in Paris and yet "one of the most agreeable games on the cards" but one that required "great tranquility and attention." This earliest known description was reprinted numerous times during the 18th century. (Note: The last known reprint was in the 1789 edition of AUJ.) In 1828, it is recorded as a game played in Normandy and the departments to the north, certainly there is evidence that it was played, for example, at Metz and in Picardy; however, other early 18th and 19th century sources say it was played mainly in the south of France, so we may assume it "travelled well". Sizette appears to have died out in the late 19th century, (Note: The last known French compendium containing the rules of Sizette appeared in 1888.) however its four-player relative Quadrette survived until the 1930s in Nice and may still be played today in that area (Alpes-Maritimes).

In a 1785 dictionary for the regions of Provence and Comtat Venaissin it is recorded that both Sizette, or Sisette, and Quadrette also went under the name Parlaire (from parler, to speak) because players were expected to talk about the cards they held in their hands.

== Rules ==
The rules given in the literature hardly changed over the century and a half that the game was current; later sources merely clarify points or give clues as to where the game was played. Those below are based on the 1725 description, supplemented where necessary by later accounts.

=== Players ===
The game is played by six players in two teams of three. The teams sit alternately around the table so that each player has an opponent on the left and right. Each team selects a team captain or 'governor'. Players decide on the stake to be anted to the poule and the number of deals needed to win the game.

=== Cards ===
A 36-card French-suited pack is used in which the cards rank in descending order from King to Six. The Ace ranks between the Jack and the Ten as in Triomphe. (Note: The 1725 rules do not mention this; the ranking of the Ace is confirmed by card game researcher, Philippe Lalanne at salondesjeux.fr.)

=== Deal ===
Players cut for the privilege of being first hand, which is an advantage; the player cutting the highest card handing the pack to the opponent on the left to deal. The dealer shuffles and offers them to the left for cutting before dealing two packets of three cards each, anticlockwise, beginning with first hand. The dealer turns up the last card for trump.

=== Play ===
The players on the team that includes first hand may them communicate among themselves about their hands; the captain uses this information to direct the others what to play; in particular to instruct first hand what to lead. Once first hand has led the first card to the opening trick, the other team has the opportunity to confer likewise. Play then continues. Players must follow suit if possible; otherwise may trump or discard as they please. Players may even lay their cards openly, but if at least two players on one side do this, the third partner must also play ouvert.

=== Winning ===
The team that is first to take three tricks wins the game singly; if they take all six they win double. Taking six tricks is called making a vole.

=== Communication and tactics ===
The key to the initial communication is for players, especially the captain, to work out what cards their team has between them without revealing too much to their opponents. Equally it is important for players to work out what cards their opponents have. Players should disclose no more than necessary and are guided by their captain asks of them. Although easy to learn, the game requires experience and long practice to play well, especially as regards player communication.

== Infringements ==
The early account includes strict rules concerning infringements. For example, a misdeal incurs the loss of the game as does revoking (not following suit when able) and a faced card entails a redeal.

== Literature ==
- _ (1725). Académie Universelle des Jeux. Paris: Theodore Legras.
- _ (1789). Académie Universelle des Jeux. Vol. 1. Amsterdam.
- Achard, Claude François (1785). Dictionnaire de la Provence et du Comté-Venaissin]. Vol. 1. and Vol. 2. Marseilles: Jean Mossy.
- Abbé Belcour (1770). The Academy of Play. London: F. Newbery.
- Lebrun, M. (1828). Manuel des Jeux de Calcul et de Hasard, ou Nouvelle Académie des Jeux. Paris: Roret.
- Panckoucke, Charles-Joseph (1792). Encyclopédie méthodique: Dictionnaire des Jeux, Volume 3. Paris: Panckoucke.
