= Vint =

Card game

- Origin: Russia
- Alternative names: Russian whist, Skruf-whist
- Type: trick-taking
- Players: 4, in partnerships
- Skills: Trick play, Communication through the bidding system
- Age range: Adults
- Cards: 52
- Deck: Anglo-American
- Rank (high→low): A K Q J 10 9 8 7 6 5 4 3 2
- Play: Clockwise

Related games
- Skruuvi, Auction bridge, Contract bridge

Vint is a Russian card game similar to both bridge and whist and sometimes called Russian whist. Vint means "screw" in Russian, and the name is given to the game because the four players propose, bid, and overbid each other until one, having bid higher than the others care to, makes the trump, and his vis-a-vis plays as his partner.

The game spread to Finland, where it evolved into Skruuvi, which features also a kitty and misère contracts.

== Description of vint ==
Vint has many similarities to rubber bridge: The cards have the same rank. The score of tricks is entered under the line, and points for slam, honors, and penalties for undertricks above the line. The bidding is similar to bridge: one bids the number of tricks and the trump suit or no trump.

During the bidding and declaring, players indicate by their calls their strength in the various suits and the high cards they hold, so that, when the playing begins, the position of the best cards and the strength of the different hands can often be fairly accurately estimated.

Unlike bridge, in vint there is no dummy, all taken tricks count toward a game (that is, the tricks taken by the defenders as well as the tricks taken by the declarer side including overtricks, regardless of whether the contract was made or not), and the bidding ends after eight consecutive passes (everyone passes twice, including the player who made the last bid). A trick's value depends on the level of the contract. In higher contracts the value is higher.

The card play follows the standard whist formula. One must follow suit, but if unable to do so, one can play any card. The trick is won by the highest trump, if there are trumps in the trick, otherwise by the highest card of the suit led. The winner of the trick starts the next one.

Points are awarded also for honors. In a no trump declaration aces count only as honors; in a suit declaration both the aces and the five next highest cards.

=== Development ===
The game emerged during the latter half of the 19th century. In primitive forms, known as Siberian vint, a trick's value depended on the level of the contract and the trump suit. Later, this was simplified so that the level of the contract was the only thing the value depended on.

Toward the end of the 19th century, the kitty was added to the game. The highest bidder took a kitty of 4 cards to his hand and gave one card for every other player before play started. Also toward the end of the 19th century, the card exchange mechanism used in Skruuvi was born. The highest bidder took the kitty in his hand, gave 4 cards for his partner, who in turn gave one card for every other player. This enabled the declarer side to arrange very shaped hands, which led to higher contracts.

The first rulebook for bridge, dated 1886, was Biritch, or Russian Whist, by John Collinson, an English financier working in Ottoman Constantinople (now Istanbul). It and his subsequent letter to The Saturday Review dated May 28, 1906, document the origin of Biritch as the Russian community in Constantinople. The word biritch is thought to be a transliteration of the Russian word Бирюч (бирчий, бирич), an occupation of a herald or announcer.

There are references to vint in classical Russian literature, notably the short stories of Anton Chekhov, The Death of Ivan Ilyich by Leo Tolstoy and Cancer Ward by Aleksandr Solzhenitsyn. The composer Tchaikovsky was an enthusiastic player.

== Skruuvi ==
Skruuvi is a Finnish variant of vint that became common in Finland while it was a part of Russia. Skruuvi's rules diverged slowly from vint, and were codified in the 1940s in the books Skruuviopas by the pseudonym O.L. and Uusi täydellinen skruuvipelin ohjekirja by the pseudonym E.N. Maalari. Skruuvi is still played in Finland as a niche hobby whereas vint is not played in Russia. Helsingin Suomalainen Klubi still organizes annual Toro Skruuvi tournament in honor of Arvo Ylppö, an enthusiastic Skruuvi player.

Skruuvi uses a bidding system similar to bridge, but the emphasis of the bidding system is more in signifying individual high cards, similar to slam-investigating cue bids in bridge.

== See also ==
- Whist with auction
- 500 (card game)
