= Romanian whist =

Trick-taking card game

Romanian Whist
- Origin: Romania
- Type: Trick-taking
- Players: 3–6
- Skills: Tactics, strategy
- Cards: 24–48
- Deck: French
- Rank (high→low): A K Q J 10 9 8 7 6 5 4 3
- Play: Clockwise
- Playing time: 30–60 min
- Chance: Easy

Related games
- Oh hell, bid whist

Romanian whist is a variant of whist which is similar to the English or American game oh hell. It is currently popular in Romania, and there it is simply called "whist".

The best chess player in Christendom may be little more than the best player of chess; but proficiency in whist implies capacity for success in all these more important undertakings where mind struggles with mind. Edgar Allan Poe

The learning curve is around 10 minutes, while the average person can play a decent game the second time they try. If not played online the game is most often untimed. A typical online game will last for 15 to 30 minutes as opposed to 30 to 60 minutes required for a decent face to face game. As with most card games, an experienced player will take into account both the mathematical and psychological aspects of play.

== Rules ==
Romanian whist is a game for 3 to 6 players (best for 4). Each player plays alone. From a standard deck use 8 cards for every player (24 for 3 players, 32 for 4 players and so on, to 48 for 6 players).

For 7 players a deck of 48 (6x8) cards is used and the dealer doesn't deal cards for himself, playing the so-called "dead hand". As the turn to deal advances around the table, each player plays "dead hand" several times during a game. There is also the possibility of adding 4 more cards to the deck, turning it into a 56 card deck (for example some decks come with 4 jokers which can be denominated as "1" card, the card with the lowest rank). In this case 7 players can play normally.

The cards rank as follows: A, K, Q, J, 10, 9, and so on. They have no value because it is a plain trick game.

=== Deal ===
The first dealer is chosen at random. Some players deal cards and the player who gets the highest one, starts. Then the turn to deal rotates clockwise after each hand. The number of cards dealt to each player varies during the game. For the first few deals each player gets only one card. This continues for as many deals as there are players. After this the number of cards dealt to each player increases by one with every deal until eventually all the cards are dealt, that is 8 cards each. Then as many deals are played with 8 cards each as there are players. Then the number of cards dealt decreases again until every player gets only one card. Once more there are as many deals with one card each as there are players. Example: With 4 players the whole game would consist of 24 deals, and the number of cards dealt each time would be as follows:
1, 1, 1, 1, 2, 3, 4, 5, 6, 7, 8, 8, 8, 8, 7, 6, 5, 4, 3, 2, 1, 1, 1, 1. (Note: Parlett's description is identical, except that the number of cards starts decreasing as soon as the deal with 8 cards has been played. So with 4 players there are 21, not 24, deals.)

After the cards are dealt, the next card is turned for trumps. In the games with 8 cards there is no card left to turn, so these games are played at no trump.

=== Bidding ===
Each player in order, beginning with the player to dealer's left, bids how many tricks they think they will take. All bids are final and cannot be changed afterwards.

To ensure that not everyone will succeed in their bid, the sum of all tricks bid must not be the same as the number of cards dealt to each player. (Example: game with six cards, three players: The first player bids "3", the next "1". The last player cannot bid "2", as this would make the sum of the tricks equal to 6. in this case, the last bidder must bid 0, 1, 3, 4, 5 or 6).

This rule puts the last bidder (the dealer) at a disadvantage, especially in the one-card hands. To counter this disadvantage, a series of one-card hands equal to the number of players is played at the beginning and end of each game.

=== Play ===
The player to dealer's left plays the first card. The other players must play a card of the same suit if possible. Any player who has no card of the suit led must play a trump if they can. A player who has no cards of the suit led and no trumps can discard any card. The trick is won by whoever played the highest trump, or if no trump was played, by whoever played the highest card of the suit led. The winner of the trick leads to the next.

The objective is to win exactly the number of tricks you said you would win.

=== Scoring ===
The hand ends when all cards are played. Scoring is as follows:

- Players who made their contract (exactly) get 5 points plus 1 point for each trick made.
- Players who took fewer tricks than their bid lose one point for each undertrick. (Note: Parlett does not mention under-tricks.)
- Players who took more tricks than their bid lose one point for each overtrick.

Examples: Suppose you bid 3 tricks. If you take exactly 3 you will win 8 points (5+3). If you take only two tricks you lose 1 point; the same if you take 4 tricks. If you take 1 or 5 tricks (two off from your bid) you will lose 2 points; if you take no tricks or 6 tricks you will lose 3.

The table for recording the points looks like this:

         Peter      John       Peggy
 --------------------------------------
   1     1   6      0   5      1  -1
   1     0  11      0  10      0  -2
   1     1  10      1  16      0   3
 --------------------------------------
   2     0  15      2  14      2  10    
   3     1  14      0  19      1  16

and so on.

The number of cards dealt in each hand is recorded in the first column on the left. Subsequent columns are used to record the bids and the cumulative score of each player. In the example above, the first hand was a one-card hand. Peter bid 1 trick and made it (5+1=6 points), John bid 0 tricks and succeeded (5+0=5 points), Peggy was forced to bid "1" and didn't make it (-1 point). The fifth hand was a three-card hand. Peter bid 1 trick and took 2 (-1 point), John was not allowed to bid "1", bid "0" and succeeded (5+0=5 points), Peggy bid 1 trick and made it (5+1=6 points).

== Variations ==
- In the last (and seldom first) games with one card the players don't look at their own card, but they hold it on their forehead. So each player can see the cards of the other players, but he doesn't know which card he holds himself. So he must guess how many tricks he can take from the biddings of the other players.
- Promotions: If a player wins 10 consecutive games (this means, if the player never fails to fulfill his contract), he may add 30 points to his total or if a player wins a number of games equal to the number of players plus one games, he may be awarded 10 points. The same number of points is subtracted if he fails to fulfill his contract just as many times. Games in which one card is dealt do not count as hands won or lost for promotions. In an 8-1-8 game, the one-card games end a winning or losing streak. DoiZece.neogen.ro, the (disputed amongst enthusiasts) popular authority on the game, awards 10 points for every won or lost streak of five games, regardless of the number of players. Yet another variation suggests that a player is denied bonus points if he bid 0 in any of the consecutive games won. This is meant to encourage high bidding.
- 0 Finish: If a player has exactly 0 points after the last hand, he wins the game. (This variation is commonly played, but is not recommended, because it tends to ruin the game at the end - players may try to lose as many games as possible, to try to reach zero.) One need not announce he intends to win a game thus.
- Eight to Eight Games: The 8-card hands are dealt first, then reducing to one card and increasing again to 8 cards. The number of 8 card hands at the beginning and end and one-card hands in the middle is equal to the number of players, so with four players you would have 8-8-8-8-7-6-5-4-3-2-1-1-1-1-2-3-4-5-6-7-8-8-8-8. These are called 8-1-8 games, as opposed to 1-8-1 games. In 8-1-8 games, you do not win if you have 0 points at the end of a game.
- Higher bidding can also be stimulated by awarding less than 5 points for fulfilling.
- 0 and NV games: In case of a draw in an endgame (or sometimes just for fun) a number of hands no larger than the number of players can be played in which players are all dealt 8 cards and are forced to bid 0. The other solution is one additional hand in which the players make a "blind bid" and then are dealt 8 cards. The games are marked "0" and "NV" respectively in the left column on the scoreboard.

== Literature ==
- Parlett, David (2008), The Penguin Book of Card Games, London: Penguin, ISBN 978-0-141-03787-5
