= Priffe =

Swedish card game

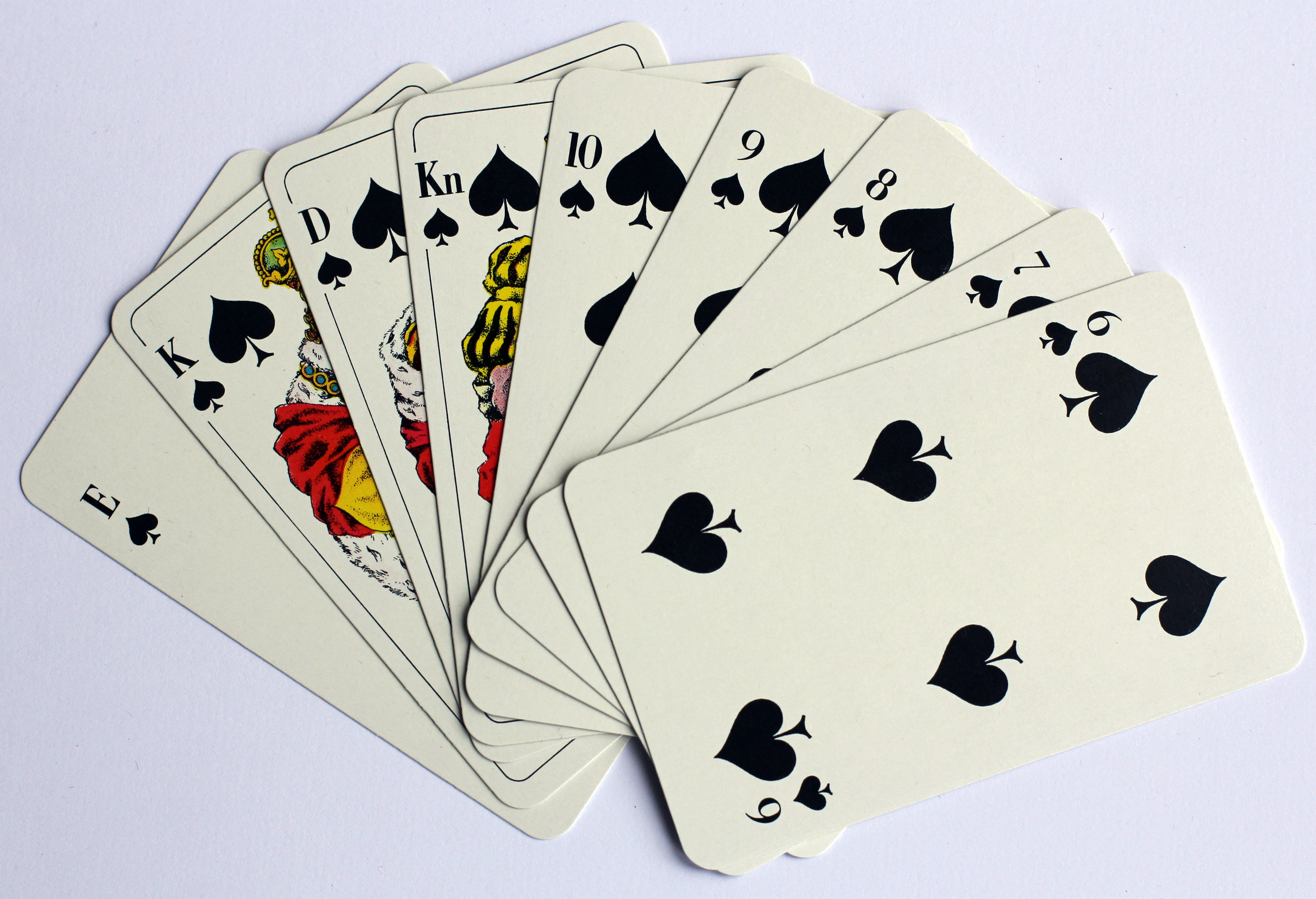
- Spades from a Modern Swedish pattern pack
- Origin: Sweden
- Alternative names: Preference
- Type: Whist group
- Players: 4
- Cards: 52 cards
- Deck: French-suited, Swedish Modern or English pattern
- Rank (high→low): A K Q J 10 9 8 7 6 5 4 3 2
- Playing time: 10 min/deal

Related games
- Whist

Priffe or Preference is a classic Swedish trick-taking card game for four players who form two teams of two. It is an elaboration of Whist that involves bidding, but this is a different form from that in American Bid Whist. Together with Vira, Priffe was one of the most common card games in Sweden until superseded by Bridge.

== Rules ==
=== Object ===
The aim of each team is to win as many tricks as possible in a trump or suit game. In the misère contract, called Noll, the goal is to take as few tricks as possible.

=== Deal ===
Players draw lots (e.g. by cutting the pack). The one who draws the highest card selects seat and becomes dealer. The player with the second highest card takes the opposite seat. The player with the third highest card selects one of the two remaining seats, and the player with the lowest card takes the remaining seat. The player to the left of the dealer is forehand.

The players sitting opposite one another are partners and compete against the other pair. In a classic game of Priffe, the players rotate so that everyone partners everyone else. In this way, an individual winner can finally be selected.

A hand begins with all cards being dealt so that the players receive 13 cards each.

== Bidding ==
Forehand opens a single round of bidding, which proceeds clockwise, everyone getting to make one bid. In 1949, Bridge players Werner and Sandgren proposed that a system with "honour tricks" (Honnörsstickstabell) be used in bidding.

=== Honour trick table ===
Honours: A K Q J 10
ht = honour trick
+ = 1/4 hs
X = low card

2+ht: A K Q in same suit
2 ht: A K (if J, if 10) in same suit
1½ht: A Q (if J, if 10) in same suit
1+ht: A J 10/X of same suit or K Q J of same suit or singleton A
1 ht: A J in same suit or K Q in same suit or K J 10 in same suit
½+ht: K J X in same suit ½ ht: K J/X in same suit or Q J 10/X in same suit + ht: Q J/10/X of same suit or singleton K/Q/J

=== Bidding ===
The possible bids in descending order are:

Bid	Description	Honours
Play (Spelut, Spela)	Highest contract, game at no trump.	All Aces
Noll (Noll)	Misère game, take as few tricks as possible. A bid of Noll from the eldest hand in a team (i.e. from the first player in a team to make a bid) means 2-3 ht and suitable cards for Noll. The hand should be weak in hearts and diamonds, especially in hearts.	All 2s
Hearts (Hjärter)	Means you want to play with hearts as trump. A bid of Hearts from the eldest hand in a team means at least 2½ honour tricks and at least 5 hearts in the hand. The hand should have suitable cards for Noll.	A K Q J
Diamonds (Ruter)	As above, with the addition that the hand must have a stop in hearts and should be acceptable for playing Noll.	A K Q J
Spades (Spader)	Information bid only by the eldest hand in a team. Means 4-4½ ht in at least three suits and strong invitation to play at No Trump. 5 hts or more should give home run in the game.	
Clubs (Klöver)	Information bid only by the eldest hand in a team. Means 2½ - 3½ ht and stops in at least three suits. Invitation to play at No Trump, but you should also be able to play a Noll.	
Pass	When you have no other bid, or when you are satisfied with previous bids.	

A bid may not be announced if a higher bid has already been made. "Pass" is the only exception, as it can be called at any time.
If any player bids "Play", the game starts at once and the remaining players may not bid.
The last bid announced becomes the final bid and the bidder and his partner become the declarers. If the final bid is Spades or Clubs, a forced Noll is played, played as a normal Noll but neither team counts as the declaring side.

=== Play ===
When the bidding is over, the result will be one of the following five contracts:

1. Forced Noll - everyone passed, and teams now aim to take as few tricks as possible
2. Diamonds - Diamonds was the highest bid; the declarers must now take as many tricks as possible with Diamonds as trump
3. Hearts - Hearts was the highest bid; the declarers must now take as many tricks as possible with Hearts as trump
4. Noll - Noll was the highest bid; the declarers must now take as few tricks as possible with no trumps
5. Play - the team whose player announced "play" must now take as many tricks as possible with no trumps

Players must follow suit if possible. The highest card of the led suit wins the trick, unless a trump was played in which case the highest trump wins. The tricks in a team are always counted together.
It is more important for the declaring side to take more (or fewer in a Noll) tricks than the other team, as the defenders get twice as many points if they manage to take more (or fewer in a Noll) than half of the tricks.
In a forced Noll, there is no declarer and, therefore, no doubling of the scores for either side.

The teams rotate when one side has reached a certain number of tricks. The number of deals that are played by a team before rotation may therefore vary during the game.

=== Outcome ===
A rubber is completed when either team has won two games. In games with a declarer, the declaring side scores 10 for every trick over 6 and an extra 10 for taking 6 overtricks (little slam) and an extra 20 for taking 7 overtricks (big slam). If the declarers lose, the defenders win double. Only points for tricks before doubling count towards winning a game.

In a Noll, each trick below 7 scores 10 points; double if the declarers lose.

In addition, points are awarded for honours. Which cards count as honours depends on the contract (see table). Honours score bonus points as follows:

- 2 honours: 0
- 3 honours: 20
- 4 honours: 40
- 4 honours in the same hand at the outset: 50

If a team has 30 or more trick points, they win the first game in the rubber and score an additional 10 bonus points. A team that has already won a game in the rubber need 40 trick points to win their second game, which gives the team an additional 20 bonus points.

When a team wins its second game, players rotate, individual points are scored for the members of each team, and a new rubber starts. Individual points are scored as follows: The points for each team are scored and the team with the higher score wins. The losers subtract their total from that of the winners and the result is divided by ten. This is then added to each winner's total and subtracted from each loser.

If you play several rubbers, you change places, with a second rubber, the dealer and forehand stay put and the other two change places. Typically six rubbers are played allowing each player to team up with every other one twice. The player with the highest individual score at the end is the overall winner.

=== Points ===
A slightly different scoring system is as follows:

Every trick	10
Every penalty trick	20
1st game won	10
2nd game won	20
Little Slam	10
Big Slam	20
Small penalty slam	20
Big penalty slam	40
Four honours in one hand	50
Three honours in one hand	20
Three honours in one hand and one with the partner	40

== Bibliography ==
- Fullständiga preference-reglor, enligt spelsättet i Stockholm : I västficksformat. Stockholm: Sigfrid Flodins förlag. 1859.
- Carlquist, Gunnar, ed. (1937). Svensk uppslagsbok. Band 21. Malmö: Svensk Uppslagsbok AB.
- Glimne, Dan (2022). Familjens bästa kortspel. Kalmar: Stevali Fakta. pp. 197–201. ISBN 978-91-89228-70-2.
- Schenkmanis, Ulf (1988). Kortspel & patienser. Västerås: ICA. pp. 208–210. ISBN 91-534-1178-1.
- Werner, Einar; Sandgren, Tore (1975). Kortoxen (9th, rev. exp. ed.). Stockholm: Forum. pp. 176–179. ISBN 91-37-05798-7.
