= Skruuvi =

Skruuvi is a Finnish variant of vint that became common in Finland while it was a part of Russia. Skruuvi's rules diverged slowly from vint, and were codified in the 1940s in the books Skruuviopas by the pseudonym O.L. and Uusi täydellinen skruuvipelin ohjekirja by the pseudonym E.N. Maalari. Skruuvi is still played in Finland as a niche hobby whereas vint is not played in Russia. Helsingin Suomalainen Klubi still organizes annual Toro Skruuvi tournament in honor of Arvo Ylppö, an enthusiastic Skruuvi player.

Skruuvi uses a bidding system similar to bridge, but the emphasis of the bidding system is more in signifying individual high cards, similar to slam-investigating cue bids in bridge.

== Differences from vint ==
In Skruuvi, as described by E.N. Maalari, there is a kitty of four cards that the declarer side gets after bidding, and the game involves some exchange of cards so that everyone ends up with 13 cards. After the exchange of cards, the bidding continues, but only the members of the declarer side are allowed to participate in bidding. The trick-taking play occurs after this second bidding round.

In addition to the vint-style scoring, the declarer side gets a bonus for a made contract that depends on the level of the contract. In Skruuvi, the non-declarer side may also double by knocking on the table before the card play starts.

It is also possible to bid misääri, a contract where the aim is to avoid tricks. In a round-pass situation a forced misääri is played.

Since the exchange of cards favors the declarer side, final contracts in Skruuvi are rather high, at a level of four or higher. In some circles undoubled contracts of four odd tricks, and sometimes also undoubled contracts of five odd tricks, are judged made without playing out the hand.

After a rubber has been played in Skruuvi, four end games (called Kotka) are played without a kitty. In the endgames the bidding starts at a level of six (small slam level), and the exchange of cards favors highly the declarer side.

A typical skruuvi night consists of three matches, where a match consists of a rubber of ordinary skruuvi and four kotkas. Between the matches, the seats are changed so that everyone plays as a partner of everyone else. The partnerships may be temporarily broken if the players make certain special bids, bolshevik or mussolini. In these contracts the declarer plays alone against everyone else, in bolshevik a grand slam misääri, and in mussolini a grand slam no trump.

== Later developments ==
The scoring system of classical Skruuvi, as played in the first half of the 20th century, was notoriously complicated, with scoring for games, made contracts, taken tricks (or avoided tricks in misääri), various honors, penalties for failed contracts, penalties for aces taken in tricks during a misääri contract and, of course, special scoring for bolshevik and mussolini.

Since the 1950s, at Helsingin Suomalainen Klubi, the scoring system has been streamlined. Bonuses for honors and the concept of playing a rubber have been dropped altogether. A match consists of four hands of ordinary skruuvi, four hands of kotkas, and four hands of bolsheviks. According to earlier rules, it was possible to bid a bolshevik, but club rules made it mandatory for everyone to bid bolshevik once during a 12-hand match. Only slam contracts and doubled contracts are actually played out; other contracts are judged made without actual card play.

Another modern variant consists of eight hands, four hands of ordinary skruuvi and four of kotkas. Points are awarded only for made contracts, avoided tricks in forced misääri, and penalties for undertricks and penalties for taken aces in misääri. In this variant, all hands are played out, but the minimum allowed final contract is five odd tricks.

== Famous players ==
- Minna Canth
- Arvo Ylppö

== Bibliography ==
- John McLeod. "Skruuvi".
- "Skruuvi".
