= Tuppi =

Variant of Minnesota whist played in northern Finland

- Origin: Northern Finland
- Type: trick-taking
- Players: 4, in partnerships
- Cards: 52
- Deck: Anglo-American
- Rank (high→low): A K Q J 10 9 8 7 6 5 4 3 2
- Play: Clockwise

Related games
- Minnesota whist, Norwegian whist

Tuppi is a variant of Minnesota whist played in northern Finland. The major difference between Tuppi and Minnesota Whist is the scoring. In Tuppi, only one team can have points at a time, and consequently the points required to win a game must be collected in consecutive hands, without opponents scoring in between.

Tuppi is not normally played for money, and formerly people played Tuppi when their economic situation did not allow them to play Sökö. Nowadays, there are Tuppi clubs in Lapland, and they organize a Finnish Championship tournament.

== Rules of Tuppi ==
The game is played by four players in fixed partnerships, partners sit opposite to each other. A normal 52 card deck is used. The ranking of cards is normal, the ace being highest. Deal all the cards to the players so that everyone has 13 cards.

=== Auction ===
Each player bids by placing one card face down on the table. Red card signifies rami, and a black card signifies nolo. The player is not allowed to use a two or a court card as the bidding card. The cards are exposed one at a time, and the first player to bid rami becomes the declarer. The bidding ends when someone bids rami, and the further cards are not exposed. If someone bid rami, the game is rami, and if no-one bid rami, the game is nolo.

If the opponents bid rami, either of the defenders is allowed to bid sooli, and play alone against the opponents, as the purpose to avoid getting tricks. The player who bid sooli puts one card away from his hand and gets one card from his partner.

In rare cases it may happen that a player does not have a suitable card to make the intended bid. In these cases, the player is allowed to make the bid verbally.

=== Play ===
In the beginning of the play, the bidding cards are returned to the players' hands.

In rami, the player right to the declarer starts the first trick. In nolo, the player left to the dealer starts the first trick. The game is an ordinary trick-taking game. The players must follow suit if possible, but there are no further rules regarding to the choice of the card. Tuppi is always no-trump.

In sooli, the ace is the lowest card, and the player who bid sooli, always plays a card into the trick last. The partner of the player who bid sooli does not participate in the game.

=== Scoring ===
- In rami, the declarer side gets four points for each trick in excess of 6.
- In rami, the defending side gets eight points for each trick in excess of 6.
- In nolo, the side that got less tricks, gets four points for each trick missing from 7 tricks.
- In sooli, if the sole player gets no tricks, he gets 24 points.
- In sooli, if the sole player takes at least one trick, the opponents get 24 points.

Only one partnership can have points at a time, and the partnership that has points is said to be nousussa (rising). If the opponents of the partnership that are nousussa get points in a hand, the game is returned to a 0–0 situation. When it is obvious that the nousussa partnership is losing a hand, the hand can be ended, since the exact point count has no significance.

The game is won by getting at least 52 points. Note that these points must be got in consecutive hands, without the opponents scoring any points in between. Thus, winning a game is rather difficult, and losing a game is considered to be a particularly shameful event.

=== Tournament rules ===
Sooli is not used. The game is stopped after a fixed number of hands (typically 16–24), if no team has won the game until then. Then the partnership wins that has collected more points altogether when nousussa. However, the game is extended until the current nousussa partnership loses a hand. When bidding, special bidding cards can be used instead of playing cards.

Traditionally, players signalled the contents of their hands to their partners using various secret gestures. Signalling with gestures is, however, strictly forbidden in the tournament rules.

== See also ==
- Minnesota whist
