= Quadrette =

Card game

- Quick-play version of Whist in which partners may communicate their hands
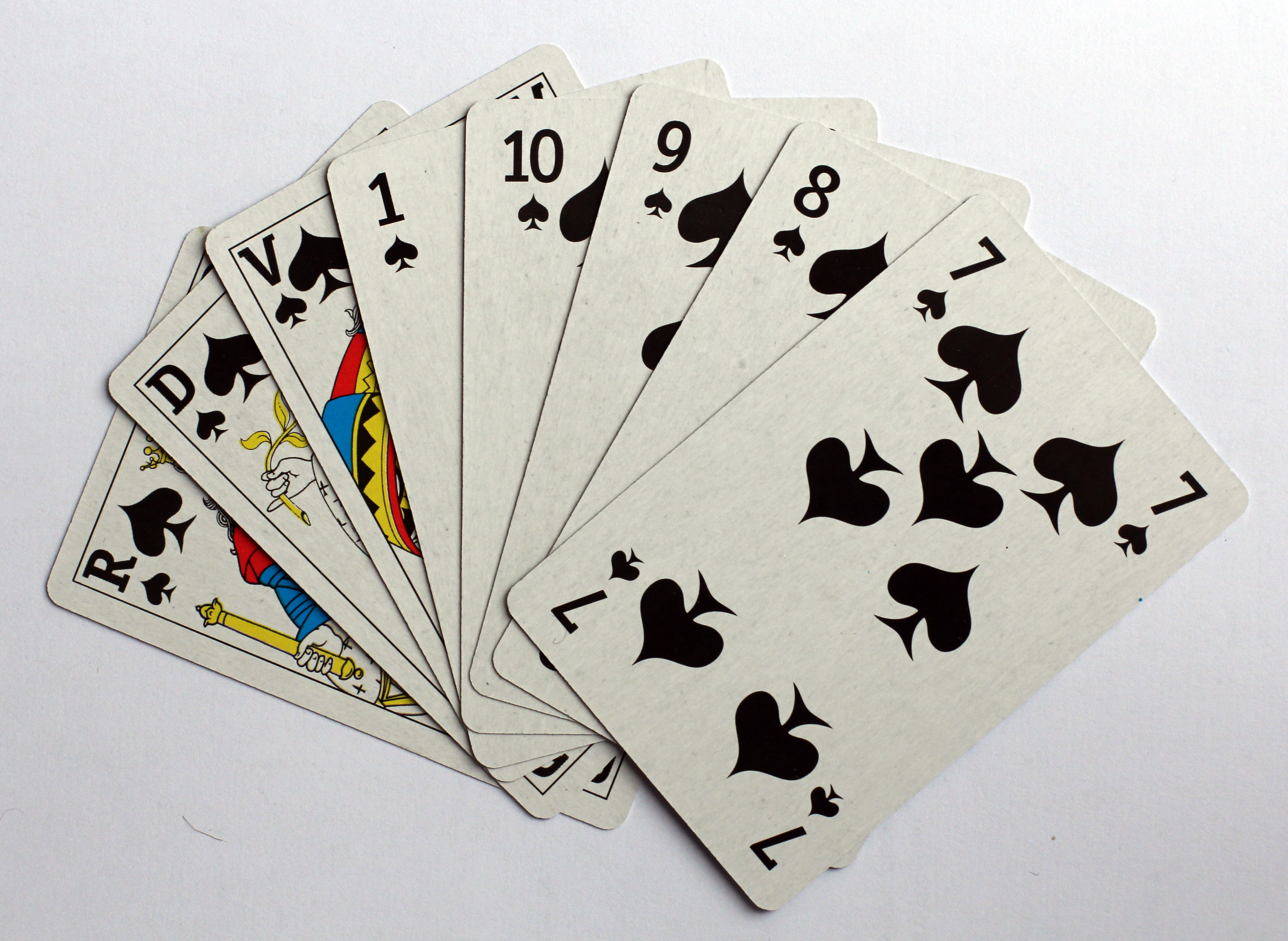
- The suit of Spades from a French pack, ranking as in Quadrette
- Origin: France
- Family: Trick-taking
- Players: 4 (2 x 2)
- Cards: 32
- Deck: French pattern
- Rank (high→low): K Q J A 10 9 8 7
- Play: Anticlockwise

Related games
- Sizette (six-player version)

Quadrette is an old French card game for four players, who form two teams of two. It is unusual in that communication between partners is allowed and the team captain is permitted to ask for information and direct play. It is a variant of classic Whist that is simpler and faster to play.

== History ==
The anticlockwise direction of play, ranking of the Ace and oral communication between partners all suggest a certain antiquity. The game appears to be a four-player offshoot of Sizette, whence the name, and Sizette (implying six players) itself was first recorded in 1725 and appears to have been played across many parts of France, both north and south, before dying out in the late 19th century. Meanwhile, Quadrette is first recorded in 1785 in a dictionary for the regions of Provence and Comtat Venaissin where, together with Sizette, it also has the name Parlaire (from parler, to speak) because players were expected to talk about the cards they held in their hands. The name Parlaire endured at least until the mid-19th century. (Note: For example, it appears in Honnorat (1841).)

In 1834, Piquet, Quadrette, and Sizette were games with which old folk in the Hautes Alpes relaxed, but it was also known in Languedoc. In 1860, Quatrète is described as a "village Whist" in Languedoc in which players indicate their hands aloud to their partner.

Quadrette survived at least until the 1930s, when it was still being played, as Quadretta, in Nice, but there are indications that it may still be played today in the same region of Alpes-Maritimes.

== Rules (1930) ==
The rules below are based on the 1930 account of "the good old game of our fathers, Quadretta, ... which held such a large place in the heart of the ordinary people and peasants of Nice".

=== Overview ===
The game is played by four players, in two teams of two with partners facing one another. The aim is to be the first team to take 4 of the 8 tricks. Deal and play, unusually, are anticlockwise. Each team chooses a captain.

A 32-card French-suited pack is used in which the cards rank in descending order from King to Seven, the Ace coming between the Jack and the Ten as in Sizette and Triomphe.

=== Deal ===
Players draw cards from the pack to determine partners and the first deal. The first to draw a King becomes the first dealer and the player who draws a King of the same colour becomes the dealer's partner. The dealer shuffles the pack, has it cut by the player to the left and deals 8 cards each in two packets, either 4-4 or 5-3, beginning with the player to the right. The dealer turns the last card for trump before picking it up and adding it to other cards in the dealer's hand.

=== Communication ===
Before play begins the teams assess their hands. The captain of the team on lead (the team that did not deal) asks questions and the partner responds with information about the cards held. The idea is for the captain to work out what cards are held and direct the partner's play accordingly, including, for example, which suit to lead. Once the first card is led, the other team does the same.

=== Play ===
Players must follow suit if possible; otherwise may trump or discard as they please. The first team to take 4 tricks won the deal and scores 1 point. If they press on to take all 8 tricks, they score 2 points.

During play, the captain may give instructions such as "take this one" or "let it run to me". In a few locations, teams could only speak when on lead.

== Rules (modern) ==
In a modern rule set by the department of Alpes-Maritimes, all is as in the 1930 rules with the following exceptions:

- Only six cards are dealt to each player and the trump is not the dealer's last card but the next card of the talon. The talon is not used during the game. This increases the level of uncertainty.
- Four tricks are needed to win the game, and six to win a double game.
- If the teams take 3 each it is a tie and both score 1 point.
- The captains of the two teams are always the current dealer and current first hand.
- After the first trick only the captains may speak.

== Examples of communication used ==
Cason gives an example of the opening discussion between a captain and his teammate:

Have you got a King? – Only one. Are you long? (Note: Are you long? i.e. is your King part of a long suit?) – Only have three. And how many trumps? – Just one. The Queen? – No. And how many Diamonds? – Only two. Play one then. And hide your hand!

— Cason (1930).

In an 1861 novel by Antoine Gandon is a description of a game of Quadrette between officers of the 17th Chasseurs. The hero, Jean Gigon, and his veteran captain converse as follows:

"Hide you hand", said the old moustache. "How many trumps do you have, Jean Gigon?" "I have the King, alas" "Very well, play the King of trumps" "King of trumps" said Gigon. "I play the Seven" said Gigon's neighbour. "And I the Eight" said the old moustache. "Me, the Nine" said the fourth player. "The first trick's ours," resumed the old soldier. "Now my boy, play your Ace." "My Ace, but I don't have it!" "How, you don't have a trump?" "No my old man" (Note: The Ace is presumably in the talon which is why it didn't appear; the old soldier assumed Gigon had held up the Ace.)... at which point an argument ensues followed by a duel.

— Gandon, Antoine (1860). Les Trente-Deux Duels de Jean Gigon: Histoire d'un Enfant Trouvé. Vol. 1. Paris: A. Bourdilliat. pp. 80–81.

== Literature ==
- _ (1725). Académie Universelle des Jeux. Paris: Theodore Legras.
- Achard, Claude François (1785). Dictionnaire de la Provence et du Comté-Venaissin. Vol. 1. and Vol. 2. Marseilles: Jean Mossy.
- Baron Ladoucette, Jean Charles François (1834). Histoire, Topographie, Antiquités, Usages, Dialectes des Hautes-Alpes. Paris: Gide.
- Cason, François (1930), "Les Jeux de Cartes à Nice: La Quadretta." In: Armanac Nissart: 288–290. Online in Occitanica collection, Centre interrégional de développement de l’occitan (CIRDOC) publ., Béziers.
- Figuier, Charlotte (1860). Nouvelles Languedociennes : les Fiancés de la Gardiole. Paris: Hachette.
- Figuier, Claire Sénart (1859). "Le Franciman: Scénes et Souvenirs du Bas-Languedoc" in Revue des Deux Mondes, Vol. 22. Paris: J. Claye. pp. 936–962.
- Honnorat, Simon-Jude (1847). Dictionnaire Provençal-Français Ou Dictionnaire De La Langue D'Oc. Vol. 3. Digne.
- Lebrun, M. (1828). Manuel des Jeux de Calcul et de Hasard, ou Nouvelle Académie des Jeux. Paris: Roret.
- Panckoucke, Charles-Joseph (1792). Encyclopédie méthodique: Dictionnaire des Jeux, Volume 3. Paris: Panckoucke.
