= Troefcall =

Surinamese card game

Troefcall is a card game from Suriname with similarities to belote and hearts, and to the Indian game court piece of which it might be a derivative.

There are competitions organized by troefcall federations in the Netherlands (Dutch: Troefcall Sportbond Nederland, TSBN) and in Suriname (Surinaamse Troefcall Bond, STcB). It is estimated that more than 100,000 people from both countries play this card game. Via Surinamese Dutch, the card game was introduced in the Netherlands. People from all Surinamese population groups play this game.

A tjall (the original name of the game) is the trump in the game. Bounie means the total gain, in other words 52 points (4 times 13 points). Kap (from Hindi koth) is a quarter of the total number of points, in other words 13.
