= Whist =

Trick-taking card game

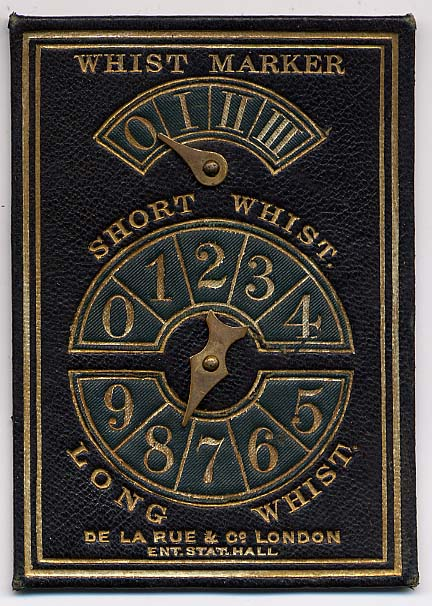
- A 19th-century whist marker by the British printing Co. De La Rue
- Origin: England
- Type: Trick-taking
- Players: 4
- Skills: Tactics, strategy
- Cards: 52
- Deck: French
- Rank (high→low): A K Q J 10 9 8 7 6 5 4 3 2
- Play: Clockwise
- Playing time: 30 min
- Chance: Medium

Related games
- Bridge

Whist is a classic English trick-taking card game that was widely played in the 18th and 19th centuries. Although the rules are simple, there is scope for strategic play.

== History ==
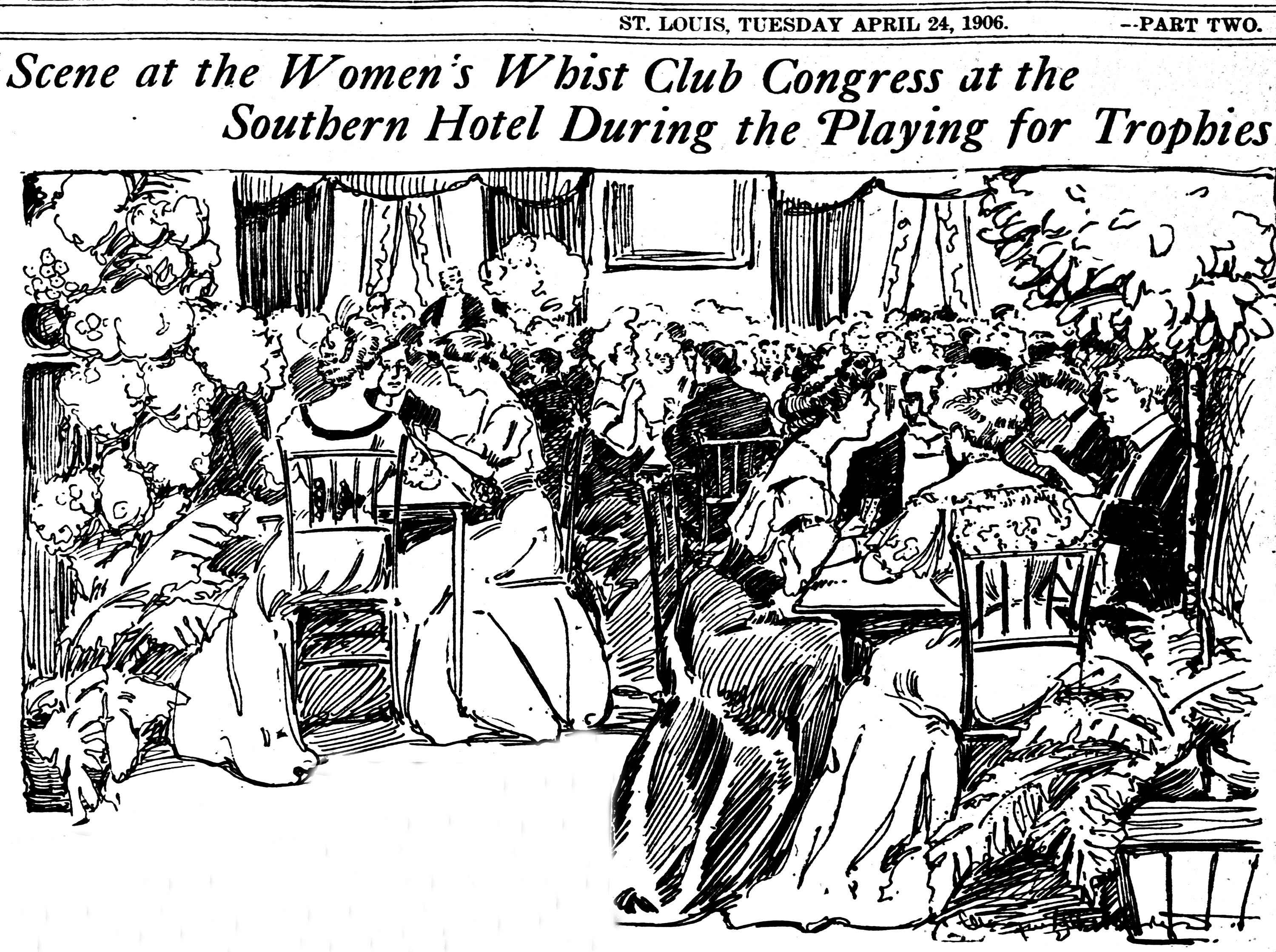
Drawing by Marguerite Martyn for the St. Louis Post-Dispatch of a session of the Women's Whist Club Congress, April 1906, in St. Louis, Missouri

In 1674, The Complete Gamester described the game Ruff and Honours as the most popular descendant of Triumph played in England during the 17th century. Whist is described as a simpler, more staid version of Ruff and Honours with the twos removed and a 10 point game. In the 18th century, Whist, played with a 52-card pack, superseded Ruff and Honours. The game takes its name from the 17th-century word whist (or wist) meaning quiet, silent, attentive, which is the root of the modern wistful.

Whist was first played seriously by gentlemen in the Crown Coffee House in Bedford Row, London, around 1728, according to Daines Barrington. Edmond Hoyle, thought to be a member of this group, began to tutor wealthy young gentlemen in the game and published A Short Treatise on the Game of Whist in 1742. It became the standard text and rules for the game for the next hundred years. Short Whist, played with a rubber of two 5-point games in Britain, and a game of 7 points in American Whist grew in popularity. Whist with the old 10 point game became known as long whist.

In 1862, Henry Jones, writing under the pseudonym "Cavendish", published The Principles of Whist Stated and Explained, and Its Practice Illustrated on an Original System, by Means of Hands Played Completely Through, which became the standard text. In his book, Jones outlined a comprehensive history of Whist, and suggested that its ancestors could include a game called Trionf, mentioned by a sixteenth century Italian poet named Berni, and a game called Trump (or Triumph), mentioned in Shakespeare's Antony and Cleopatra.

Many subsequent editions and enlargements of Jones's book were published using the simpler title Cavendish on Whist. Whist by now was governed by elaborate and rigid rules covering the laws of the game, etiquette, and play, which took time to study and master. By the later 19th Century official rules of Short Whist were maintained by The Portland Club in London and The Whist Club in New York. The superior American system of leads and signals was adopted in the last edition of Cavendish.

In the early 1890s, Whist was quickly replaced by the new game of Bridge in clubs. Whist was still played as a social game, in club individual duplicate cardplay competitions, and later at charitable social events called whist drives. There are many modern variants of whist still played for fun, though whist can still be played online following the same rules as 300 years ago.

== Rules ==
A standard 52-card pack is used and the game is played clockwise. By the time of Whist, the ace had been promoted to top honour, so the cards are ranked (highest to lowest): A K Q J 10 9 8 7 6 5 4 3 2. Whist is played by four players who draw cards to decide partnerships and the dealer. The two lowest cards play together, and choose their seats facing each other. Highest card is dealer and second highest is their partner.

=== Shuffling and dealing ===
Dealer chooses a pack, which their side will deal throughout, and passes it to the player on their left to be shuffled. Dealer then picks up the pack, and may give it a last shuffle, before passing to the player on their right to cut. Dealer then completes the cut and deals 13 cards to each player one at a time, dealing their last card face up to set trumps.

=== Play ===
The play at Whist is the simplest form of Triumph and has been used by many other games. Eldest hand, the player on dealer's left, leads to the first trick. Dealer picks up the trump card when it is their turn to play. Players must follow suit if they can. If they cannot follow suit, players may either discard (play a losing card) or Ruff (play a trump card). The trick is won by the highest card of the suit led, unless trumps are played to the trick, when the highest trump wins.

Before the next trick starts, a player may ask to review the cards from the last trick. The winner of the trick leads to the next trick.

=== Scoring ===
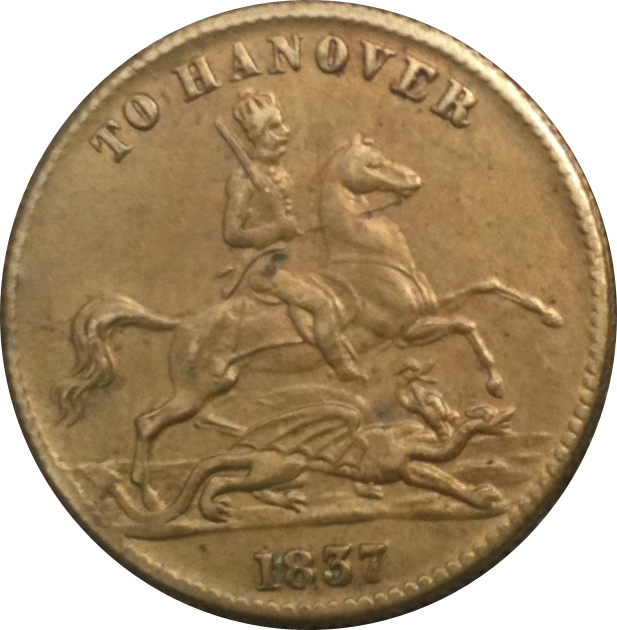
19th-century whist scoring counter, depicting the departure of Cumberland Jack from Britain.

The first six tricks won by a pair do not score any points. A point is scored for each “odd trick” (trick in excess of six) won by a pair.

Long Whist was originally played with a game of 9 or 10 odd tricks, and usually played with honours.

In American Short Whist, a game was seven odd tricks.

Short Whist in Britain was played with a game of five odd tricks, and the first pair to win two games won the rubber. Honours were optional with a pair holding three of the top four honours getting one trick bonus, and all four top honours a two trick bonus.

Modern Short Whist is commonly played with three honours worth two points and all four honours worth four points. A pair with four points is unable to win game by honours and needs to make an odd trick.

When playing for stakes a game is one point. A game where opponents score only 1 or 2 tricks is a double game, and game where opponents don't score any tricks is a triple game. There is a two-point bonus for winning the rubber.

Whist can be scored with a pen and paper, or with whist markers.

=== Conventional play ===
A skilled player tries to determine who holds the cards they do not hold, and to give their partner information about which cards they themself hold, in order that in the final tricks of the hand they may know where most or all of the cards lie. There is no bidding in whist as there is in bridge, so partners can only get information about each others' hands from the cards played.

There are a large number of conventions about what card to play, especially when leading and in the early hands of the game, which serve not simply as a strategy for winning tricks but as a way to inform one's partner about cards held.

For example, on the very first lead of the game it is conventional for a player to lead their strongest suit, usually their longest. If a player leads an Ace then a King of the same suit, that conventionally means those were the only two cards in that suit; but if they led King then Ace, that would mean they also held some low cards in that suit.

== Terminology ==
Deal
One card at a time is given to each player by the dealer starting with the player on the dealer's left and proceeding clockwise until the deck is fully distributed.
Dealer
The player who deals the cards for a hand.
Deck
The pack of cards used for playing comprising 52 cards in four suits.
Dummy
In some variations, a hand is turned face up and is played from by the player seated opposite. This allows the game to be played by three players.
Finesse
The play of a lower honour even though holding a higher one, hoping that the intermediate honour is held by a player who has already played to the trick. To give an example: you hold the ace and queen of hearts. Your right-hand antagonist leads a heart, from which you infer that he holds the king of the same suit and wishes to draw the ace, in order to make his king. You however play the queen, and win the trick; still retaining your ace, ready to win again when he plays his king.
Game
Reaching a total score agreed beforehand to be the score played up to.
Grand Slam
The winning, by one team, of all thirteen tricks in a hand.
Hand
Thirteen tricks. (52 cards in the deck divided by four players equals thirteen cards per player.)
Honours
In some variations, extra points are assigned after a game to a team if they were dealt the ace, king, queen, and jack (knave) of the trump suit.
Lead
The first card played in a trick.
Lurch
Rare or obsolete. To prevent one's adversary from scoring a treble [OED] or in the phrase 'save one's lurch' to just escape losing the game [Hoyle, Britannica 1911].
Pack
See Deck.
Rubber
Three games.
Small slam
The winning, by one team, of twelve tricks in a hand.
Tenace
A suit holding containing the highest and third-highest of the suit or (the "minor tenace") second- and fourth-highest.
Trick
Four cards played one each by the players.
Trump
The suit chosen by the last-dealt card that will beat all other suits regardless of rank. If two or more trump cards are played in a single trick, the highest-ranking trump wins it.

== Variants ==
As Whist is the simplest form of Triumph played with full 52-card pack and developed formal rules, it formed the basis of many subsequent trick-taking games. McLeod classifies this family into a number of sub-groups: the auction whist, Boston, classic whist and exact bidding groups, and games played by numbers of players other than four. The following is a selection within each sub-group.

=== Auction whist group ===
The auction whist group is a family of games with the characteristics of whist – an auction for the right to choose trumps won by the highest contract or largest number of tricks – and fixed partnerships.

- Bid whist – a partnership game with bidding, popular among African Americans in the United States.
- Dutch whist, similar to diminishing contract whist, where up to seven players compete to win the most points by betting at the start of each round how many tricks they will win. In Dutch whist, players start with one card in round one and go up to seven cards, then play a midsection of rounds with No Trumps (5 points per trick won), Misery (lose 5 points per trick 'won'), Blind (betting on number of tricks before cards are seen). Following the mid-section, seven further rounds are played, starting with seven cards and reducing to one. Trumps each round are pre-designated, following the pattern hearts, clubs, diamonds, spades. Scoring is based on 10 points for a correct bet, 1 point for every trick won (whether wanted or not).
- Siberian vint – a predecessor and more primitive form of vint.
- Skruuvi – a Finnish variant of vint, which became common in Finland while it was a part of Russia.
- Spades – a contract-type game similar to bid whist; the game's name comes from the fact that spades is always the trump suit.
- Tarneeb (played in the Arab world, a game in which the person who wins the bid picks the trump).
- Vint is a Russian card-game also known as Russian whist, with an ascending auction similar to bridge and more complex scoring than whist.
- Whist with auction – a Polish version of whist invented in the second half of the 19th century with advanced bridge-like bidding. Replaced by very similar and more refined vint.

=== Boston group ===
- Belgian Whist or Wiezen a simple game that Solo Whist is based on.
- Colour Whist (whist à la couleur or kleurwiezen) a more complex form of Wiezen with bidding that is popular in Flemish regions.
- Boston – played in 19th-century Europe, played by Count Rostov in Leo Tolstoy's novel War and Peace.
- Solo whist – played in Britain; a game where individuals can bid to win five, nine or thirteen tricks or to lose every trick.

=== Classic whist group ===
- Double sar (also played in south Asia), a variation of court piece in which tricks are only captured when the same player wins two tricks in succession. The player then captures all the unclaimed tricks up to that point.
- Hokm, also known as court piece or rang, and alike troefcall (an originally Persian game).
- Minnesota whist – in which there are no trumps, and hands can be played to win tricks or to lose tricks; see also the very similar game of Norwegian whist.
- Quadrette – French variant with a shortened pack in which partners communicate about their cards, and one directs the play of the other. Good for teaching learners and children.
- Swedish whist – four-hand Swedish game with two contracts: red (positive) and black (negative).

=== Exact bidding group ===
In these trick taking games the object is to win exactly the number of tricks that you bid.

- Blob – British variant of oh hell in which players try to predict the exact number of tricks they will take and will be 'blobbed in' if wrong. Can be played with four or five players. Six cards each, total number of tricks bid for in each hand cannot add up to six. Person to left of dealer nominates trumps or no trumps and then becomes dealer for next hand.
- Oh hell or Contract whist – a game for three to seven players in which the number of cards dealt is usually increased or decreased by one in each successive deal. Also known as oh pshaw or nomination whist.
- Israeli whist – game related to oh hell, in which one tries to bid the exact number of tricks one will take.
- Romanian whist – game in which players try to predict the exact number of tricks they will take; similar to oh hell.

=== Whists for other numbers of players ===
- Dummy whist – a three-player variant of bid whist.
- German whist – British two-player adaptation of whist without bidding.
- Knock-out whist, trumps (UK) or diminishing whist – game in which a player who wins no tricks is eliminated.
- Three-handed whist – also called widow whist, a three-player variant in which a dummy hand is dealt, which players have the option to exchange for their own hand.

=== Other games called 'whist' ===
- Catch the ten (also known as Scotch whist) – two to eight players, 36 cards related to the ace–ten family.
- Danish whist or call-ace whist. Combines several whist variants, including Solo Whist and the game Esmakker ("ace partner") in which the bidder chooses his partner by calling an ace, who becomes a blind partner, and only revealed by playing the partner ace. Is also often played with 2 or 3 jokers as automatic suit-breaking trump cards. McLeod records two types: one with fixed partnerships and one in which the partner is called by an Ace.
- Ladder whist – A student game that is effectively the opposite of knock-out whist. Players start as 'dogs' with just one card each and win the game by achieving a hand of 7 cards.
- Progressive whist or compass whist – a competition format in which two players from each table move to the next table after a fixed number of games which are played to a fixed format, e.g. with the designated trump suit changing each time.

== Whist drive ==
A whist drive is a social event at which progressive games of whist are played across a number of tables which are numbered or ordered into a sequence.

In it, the winning (or sometimes losing, dependent on the local custom) pair of a hand "progress" around the room, i.e. one person moves up the table sequence and one person moves down. On arriving at the new table, the next hand is played.

By convention the pair who sits has shuffled and deals after the arriving pair has cut the pack.

A progressive whist drive is normally 24 hands, with each hand being a different trump. Trumps normally follow the sequence: hearts, clubs, diamonds, spades.

Sometimes a break for refreshments is taken after 12 hands.

== See also ==
- 42
- Bridge
- Euchre
- Napoleon
- Skat
- Solo whist

== Bibliography ==
- Parlett, David (2008). The Penguin book of card games. London: Penguin. ISBN 978-0-141-03787-5.
- Notes and Queries. Oxford University Press. 1872.
