= Mahjong (disambiguation) =

Mahjong is a four-player game of Chinese origin

Mahjong or Mah-Jong may also refer to:

- Mahjong solitaire, a tile-matching game usually played on a computer
- Different gameplay-style developments to the original Chinese game, such as:
  - Japanese mahjong, aka riichi mahjong
  - American mahjong
  - Three-player mahjong
- Mah-Jong, a 1983 video game by Nintendo
- Mahjongg (band), an indie band based in Chicago
- Mah-Jongg (lemur), a ring-tailed lemur
- Mahjong (film), a 1996 Taiwanese comedy film

== See also ==
- Mojang Studios
