= Sanma =

Sanma may refer to

- Sanma Province, Vanuatu
- Sanma Akashiya, a Japanese comedian
- Sanma (サンマ), the Japanese name for Pacific saury
- Three player mahjong in Japanese
