= Joseph Babcock =

Joseph Babcock may refer to:

- Joseph Park Babcock (1893–1949), American writer who popularized Mahjong in the U.S.
- Joseph W. Babcock (1850–1909), U.S. Representative from Wisconsin
