= American mahjong =

Mahjong variant

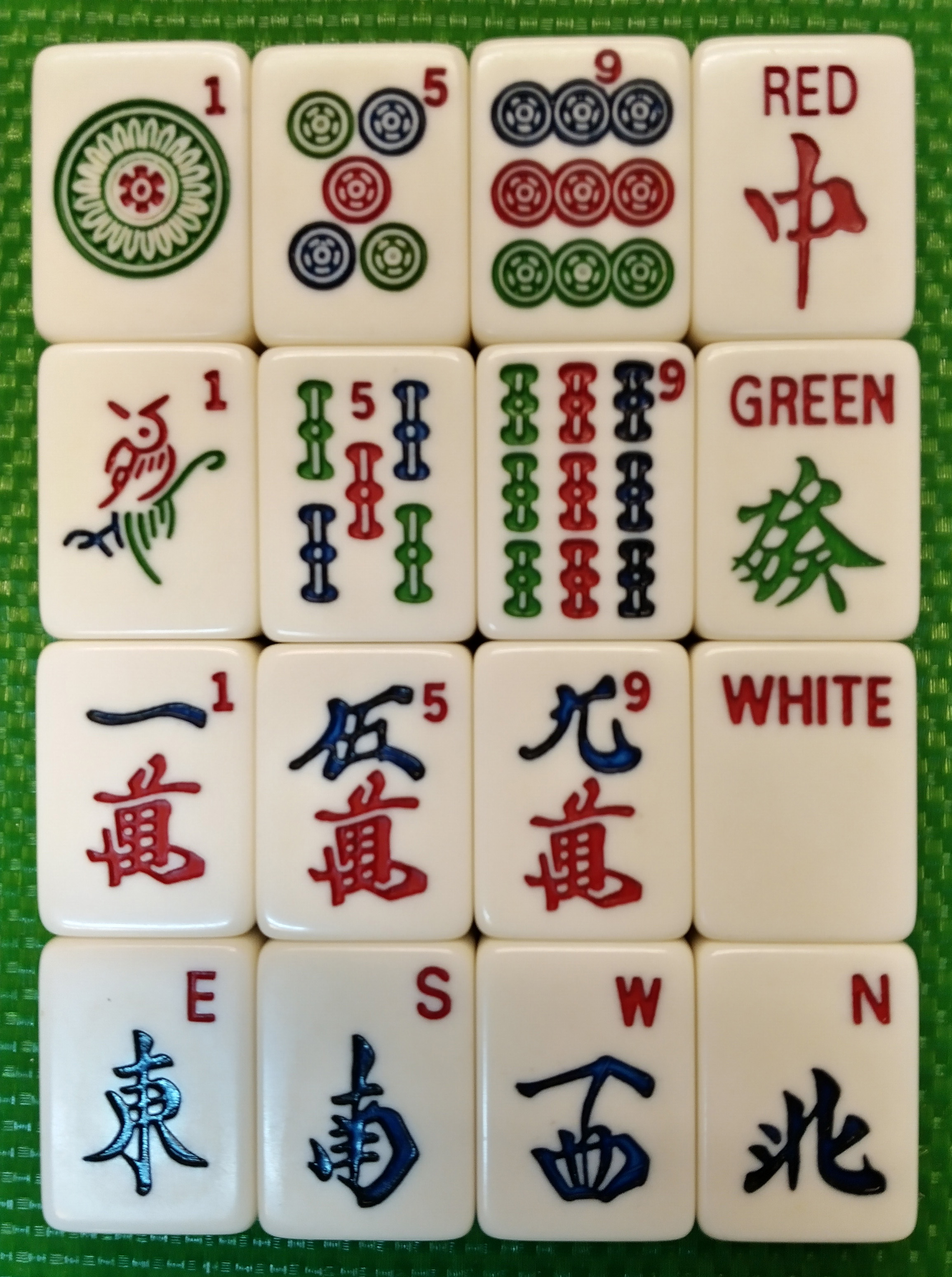
Mahjong tiles with Latin letters and Arabic numerals added for an American audience

American mahjong, also spelled mah jongg, is a variant of the Chinese game mahjong. American mahjong utilizes racks to hold each player's tiles, jokers, and "Hands and Rules" score cards. It has several distinct gameplay mechanics such as "The Charleston", which is a set of required passes, and optional passing of the tiles.

American mahjong is played with four players using mah jongg tiles. The goal of the game is to be the first, by picking and discarding, to match one's tiles to a specific hand from the annually distributed scorecard published by the National Mah Jongg League (NMJL) and American Mah-Jongg Association (AMJA). Scoring is done by matching the points assigned to each pre-determined hand on the annually distributed NMJL card & AMJA card.

== History ==
Joseph Park Babcock, a representative of the Standard Oil Company in Shanghai, was importing mahjong sets to the United States in great numbers by 1923. To increase interest in the game in the United States, he wrote and published new rules that became the American standard. These rules were nevertheless fairly close to the original Chinese rules.

When the National Mah Jongg League, Inc. published a volume of "Official American Rules" in 1935, the American style further morphed into a very distinct form.

American mah jongg tournament standards and rules were established in 1986, when the National Mah Jongg League and Mah Jongg Madness jointly conducted their first annual Mah Jongg Tournament at Sea. This tradition of championship tournaments at sea continued for over 34 years. Now there are American mah jongg tournaments conducted throughout the United States, and consist of players from America and Canada. Mah Jongg Madness conducts more than a dozen tournaments a year and an annual NMJL cruise culminates in the National Mah Jongg Convention in Las Vegas every March.

Tournaments are now played according to the Standardized National Mah Jongg Tournament Rules, which were codified and published in 2005. In 2011, Mah Jongg Master Points (MJMP) were established to post an individual's tournament scores. The MJMP website formulates the scores (awarding bonus points to the top 10 winners of an event), and ranking the individual players. There are 10 ranks for players, based on the accumulation of these points.

== Using tiles ==
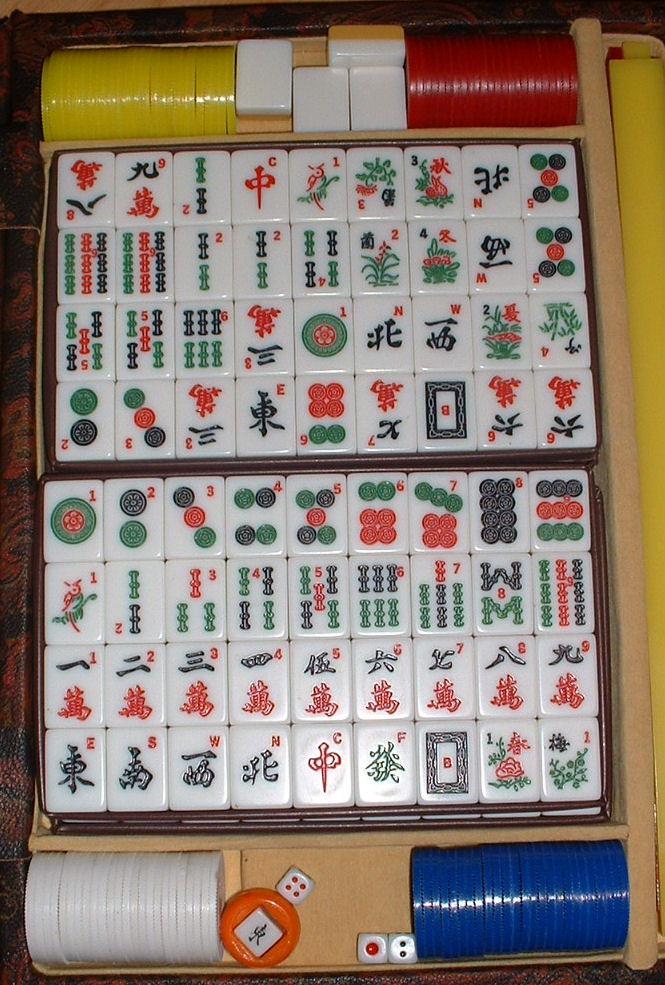
A set of American mahjong tiles

The total number of mahjong tiles in the American mahjong is 152, as shown below. American Mahjong sets are notably different from Chinese Mahjong sets, and can be identified by the usage of several additional tiles, Arabic numerals, and English words.

=== Dots ===
From one dot to nine dots, four tiles of each type, 36 tiles in total. The dots represent Chinese coins, such as the Kaiyuan Tongbao. The rank is typically indicated with an Arabic numeral in one corner.

=== Bamboos (bams) ===
From one bamboo to nine bamboo, four tiles of each type, 36 tiles in total. The rank is typically indicated with an Arabic numeral in one corner.

The one bamboo also known as the bird.

=== Characters (craks) ===
From one crak to nine craks, four tiles of each type, 36 tiles in total. The top Chinese characters represent the numbers 1 to 9 and the bottom character is the numerical unit of 10,000. The rank is typically indicated with an Arabic numeral in one corner.

=== Winds ===
The four types of winds are: East, South, West and North, four tiles of each type, 16 tiles in total.

The letters "E" (for East), "S" (for South), "W" (for West) and "N" (for North) are usually written on the tiles.

=== Dragons ===
The three types of dragons are: White dragon (also known as soap), Green dragon and Red dragon, four tiles of each type, 12 tiles in total. In American Mah Johngg sets, the traditional red "中" (“middle") and green "發" (verb: "to make wealth") characters are sometime replaced with images of a red and green dragon, respectively.

or

The words "White", "Green" and "Red" are usually written on the tiles, stating which dragon it is. Alternatively, some sets will print letters "P" or "B" (for "白" in Cantonese Romanisation) on the white dragon, "F" (for "發" in Cantonese Romanisation) on the green dragon, and "C" (for "中" in Cantonese Romanisation) on the red dragon.

=== Flowers ===
In the demonstration of NMJL, the two groups of flowers are "Spring (春), Summer (夏), Autumn (秋), Winter (冬)" and "Fortunate (福), Luxurious (祿), Longevity (壽), Noble (貴)".

However, the two groups of normal flowers commonly found in mahjong tiles, i.e. "Spring, Summer, Autumn, Winter" and "Plum blossom (梅), Orchid (蘭), Chrysanthemum (菊), Bamboo (竹)" can also be used.

Each flower associated with an Arabic number and a specific direction, as below:

Flowers
No	Image	Name	Character	Direction
1	Plum blossom	Plum blossom	梅	East
2	Orchid	Orchid	蘭	South
3	Chrysanthemum	Chrysanthemum	菊	West
4	Bamboo	Bamboo	竹	North

Seasons
No	Image	Name	Character	Direction
1	Spring	Spring	春	East
2	Summer	Summer	夏	South
3	Autumn	Autumn	秋	West
4	Winter	Winter	冬	North

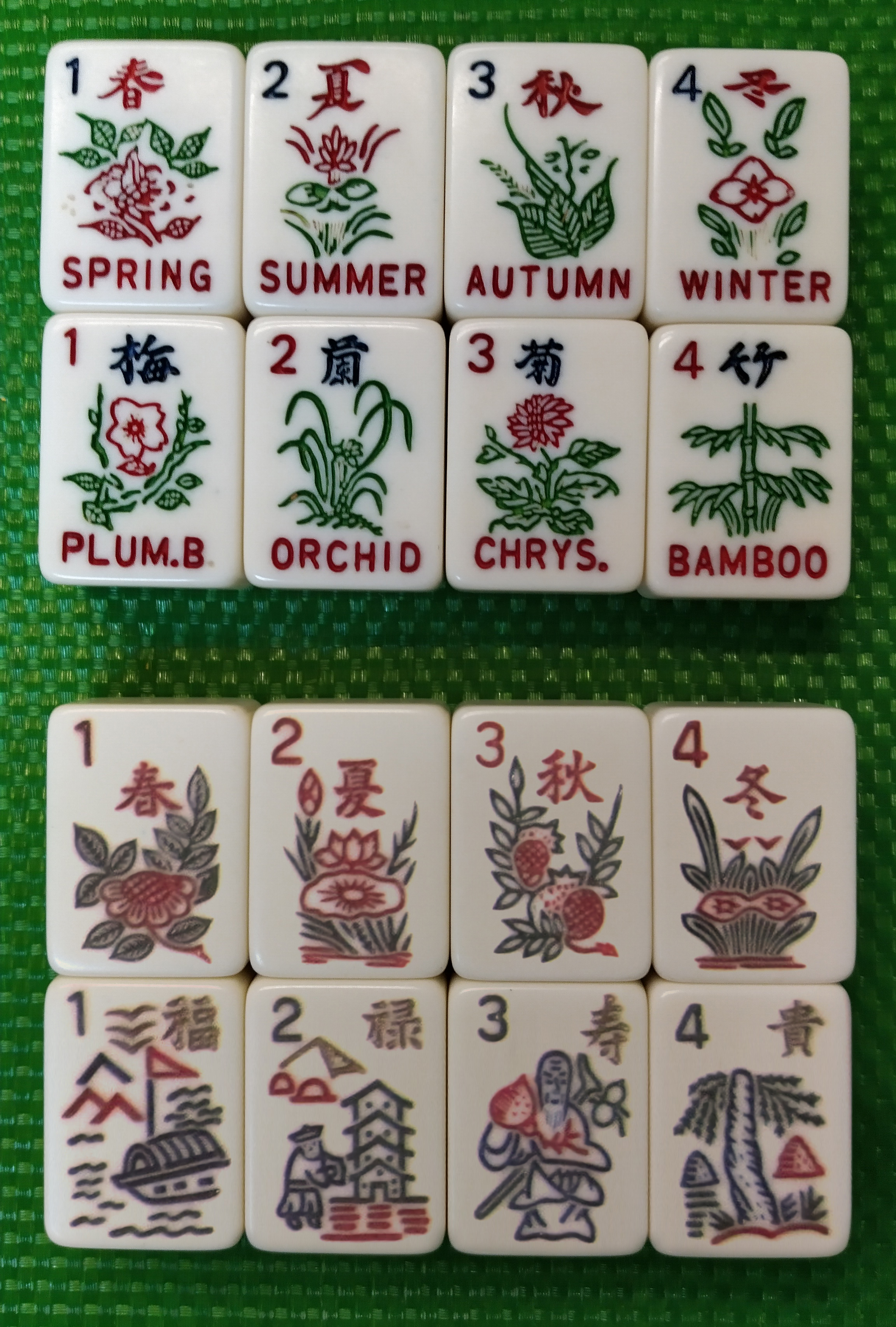
Two patterns of American Mahjong flowers, the upper one is "Spring, Summer, Autumn, Winter; Plum blossom, Orchid, Chrysanthemum, Bamboo" and the lower one is "Spring, Summer, Autumn, Winter; Fortunate, Luxurious, Longevity, Noble".

The words "Spring", "Summer", "Autumn", "Winter" and "Plum.B", "Orchid", "Chrys", "Bamboo" are usually written on the tiles, stating which flower it is. Besides, some will say Arabic numbers 1 to 4.

=== Jokers ===
American Mahjong also has 8 Joker tiles, they are all-purpose tiles. These are uncommon in Chinese variants, but are normal in other regional variants, such as Thai and Vietnamese mahjong.

=== Examples ===
There are a number of regional designs for mahjong tiles from different regions. Here are some examples.

Examples of a set of mahjong tiles
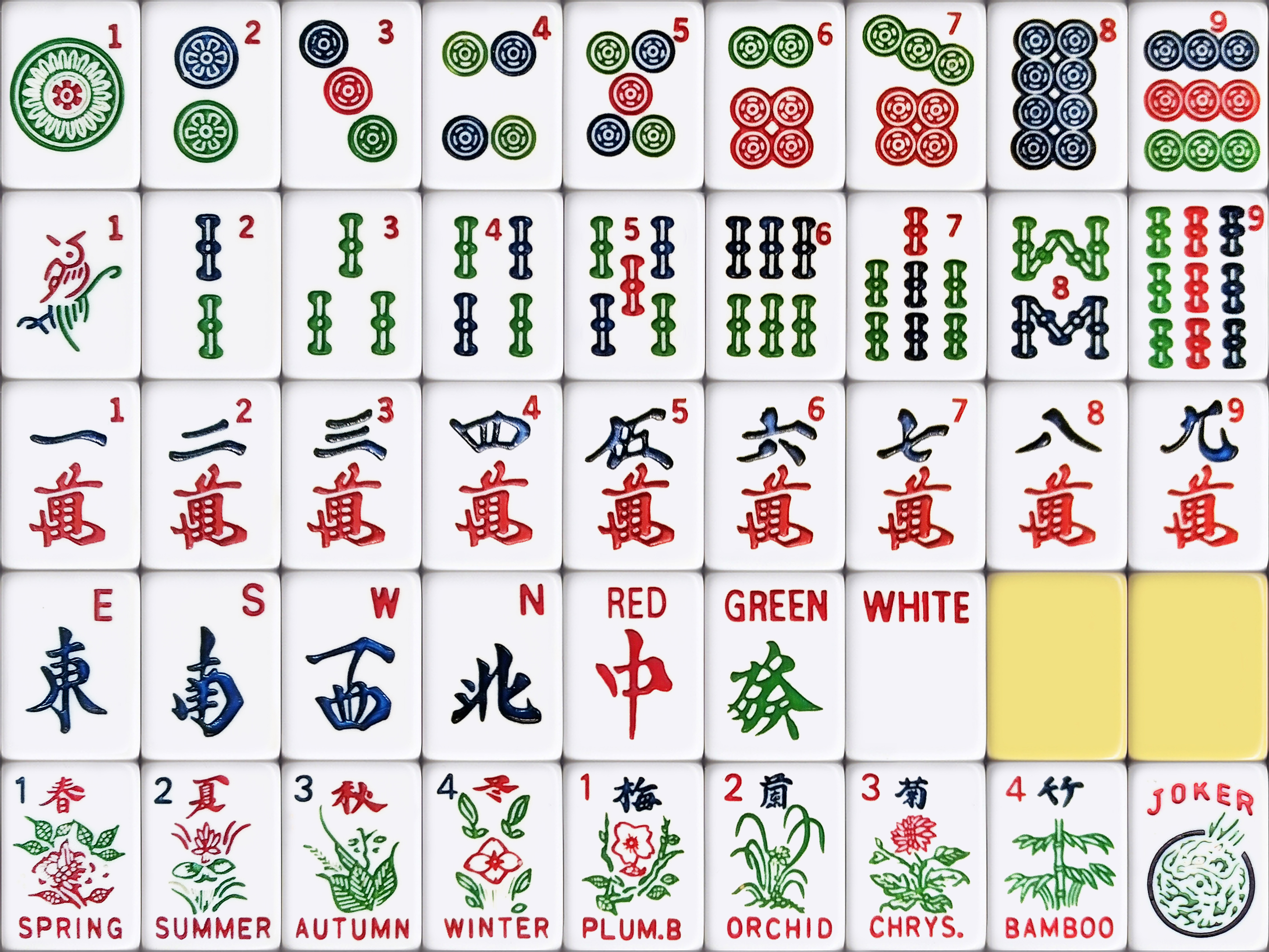
Bought from Europe, tiles and are marked with Arabic numbers, letters or English words.

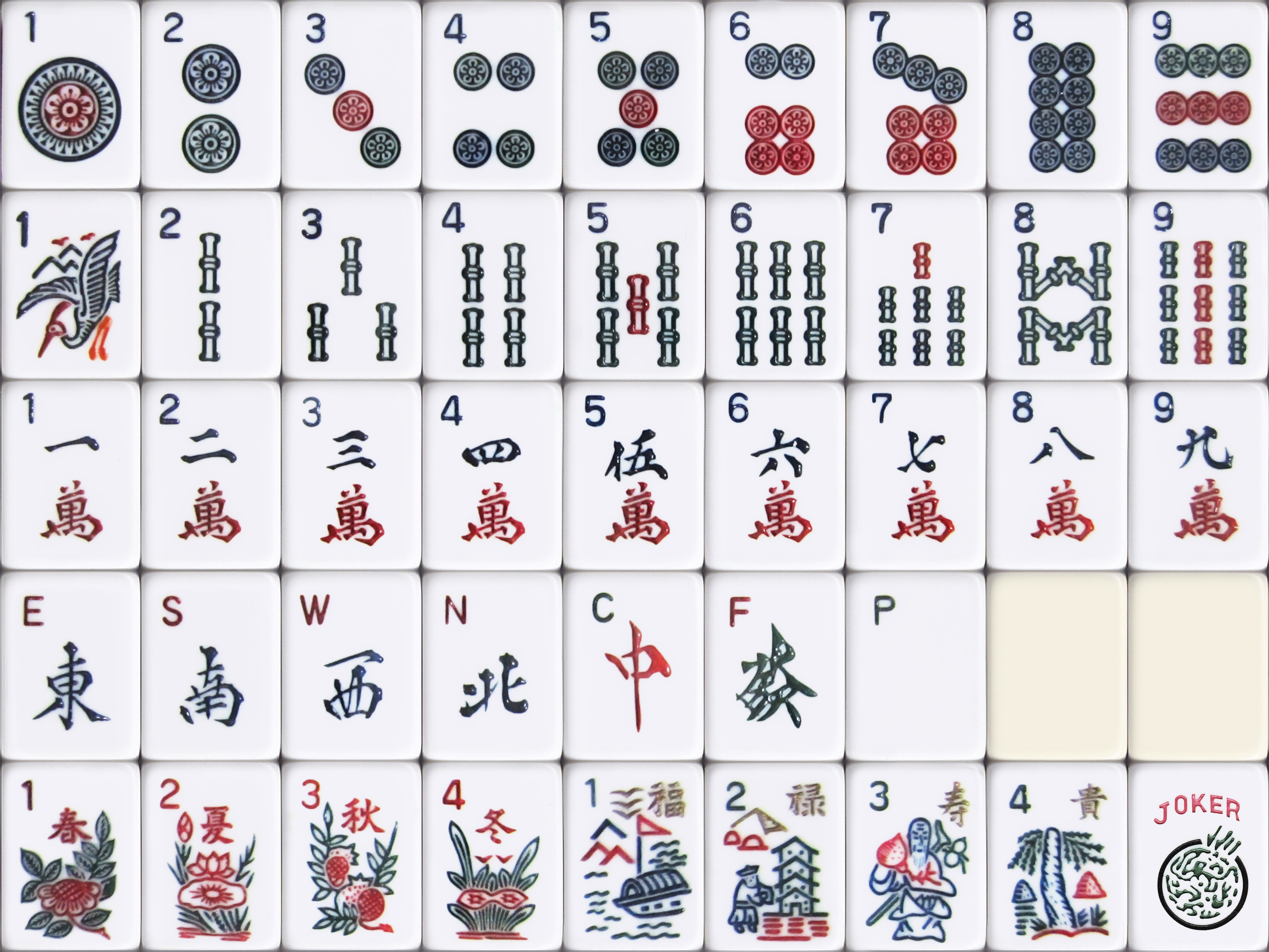
Bought from the USA, the position of the numerals or letters differs from the European tiles, the one bamboo tile is a swooping crane.

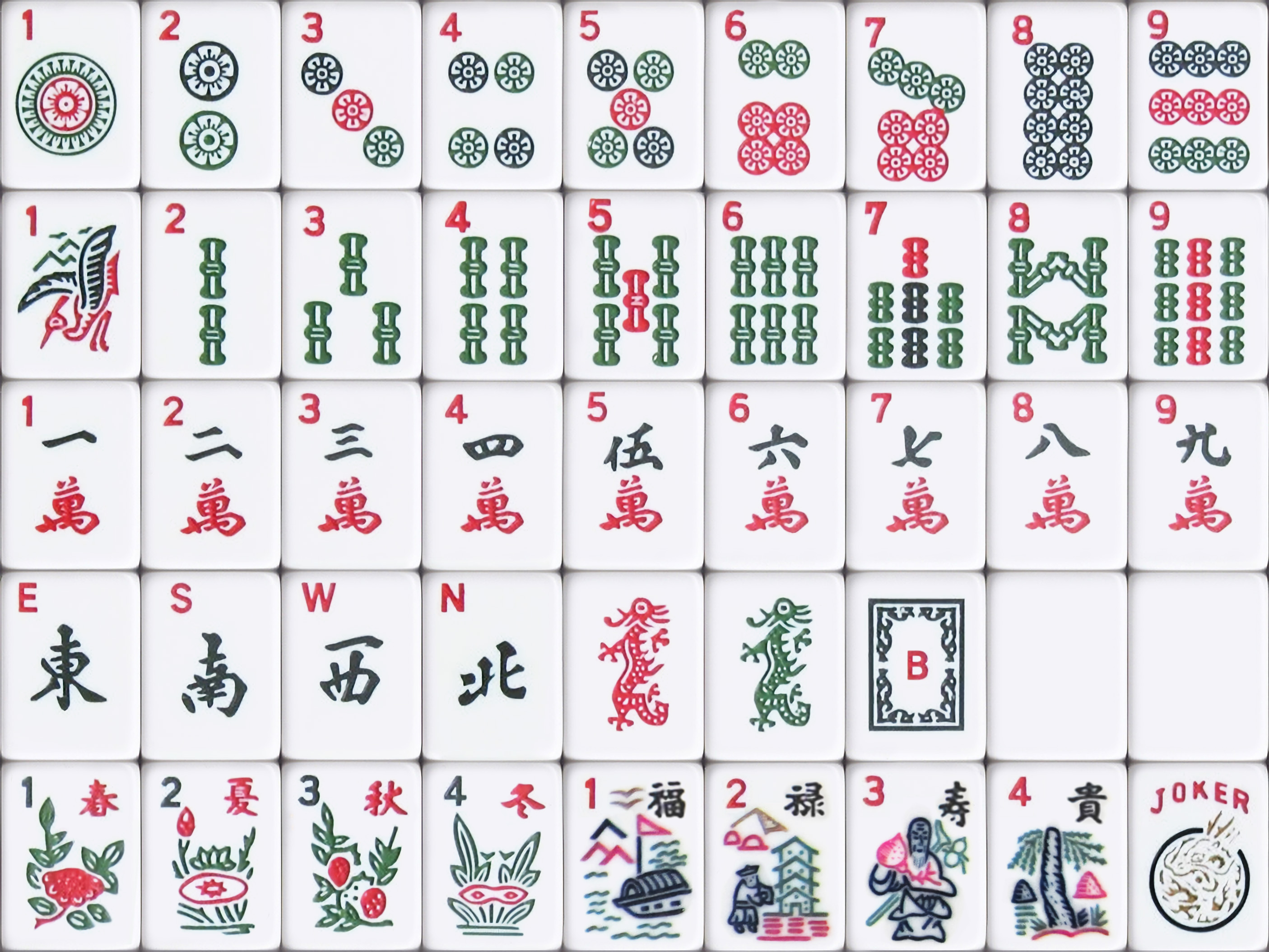
Another tile set bought from the USA, dragon illustrations are used in the red dragon and green dragon tiles.

== Rules ==
The hands are usually placed on the rack, and the tiles called and shown must be placed on top of the rack.

=== Compositions of tiles ===
The compositions of tiles are: pair (2 of the same tiles), pung (3), kong (4), quint (5), and sextet (6).

=== Joker tiles ===
Joker tiles cannot be passed to the other players during the Charleston (exchanging tiles). When 3 Joker tiles go together, they can be a composition.

== Game overview ==
The players roll dice to determine East. The highest roll is designated as East. Each player then stacks a row of 19 tiles, two tiles high in front of them (for a total of 38 tiles). Then the East player will decide the opening break with two dice. From the break, each person will take 13 tiles in hand (14 tiles for the East player). After the tiles in hand have been sorted, if the East player has a completed hand, then they can declare Mahjongg immediately. Otherwise, the Charleston will be conducted:

1. Each player passes three unwanted tiles to their right, and receives three tiles from the player on the left.
2. Each player passes three unwanted tiles to the player across, and receives three tiles from the player across.
3. Each player passes three unwanted tiles to the player on their left, and receives three tiles from the player on the right.

A second Charleston takes place if all players agree. The second Charleston is done in reverse order: left, across, right.

On the last pass of each Charleston (first left, second right), a blind pass is permitted. This means a player can take one, two, or three tiles that were passed to them and, without looking at the tile(s), can pass these tiles instead of tiles from their hand. Each pass still includes three tiles.

Following the Charleston passing, an optional "courtesy pass" takes place. Players have the option of exchanging zero to three tiles with the player across from them. The two players agree on the number of tiles to be exchanged.

East now discards a tile to start play, if they do not have a completed hand.

On a player turn, they start by drawing a tile and then either discarding a tile from their hand, or declaring Mahjongg with a completed hand. After a player's discard, the other players can call the discard for a set, which has to be exposed, or Mahjongg if that tile would make their hand a completed hand. The game proceeds until all the tiles are taken from the walls of tiles, resulting in a drawn game, or a player declares Mahjongg after completing their hand.

== Scoring method ==
NMJL publishes an official rulebook every year, and the winning hands changes every year, based on the scorecard.

The minimum score for a winning hand is 25 points. In the case of calling Mahjong (winning), the player who discarding a tile from which another player calls mahjong must pay twice the number of points, while the other player pays only the number of points. In a self-draw, the other three players pay twice as the points.

== Links ==
- National Mah Jongg League (NMJL)
- Official National Mah Jongg League Internet Game
- American Mah-Jongg Association (AMJA)
- Standardized National Mah Jongg Tournament Rules
- Mah Jongg Master Points
- Yellow Mountain Imports: How to Play American Mahjong
- Mahjongtime: American Style Mahjong Rules
- Danville Alamo Walnut Creek: The Rules for Modern American Mah-jongg
- Mahjong Wiki
