= Joseph Park Babcock =

American popularizer of Mahjong (1893–1949)

Joseph Park Babcock (1893 – 1949) was an American popularizer of Mahjong, who was born in Lafayette, Indiana. After graduating from Purdue University with a degree in Civil Engineering, he worked for the Standard Oil Company. In 1912 he was sent to Suzhou, China, as a representative of Standard Oil. There he and his wife enjoyed playing the Chinese tile game. He created a simplified version of Mahjong with a goal of introducing the game to America. He trademarked the spelling "Mah-Jongg" which he apparently coined. His Rules of Mah-Jongg, or the red book, (1920) was used as a rule book for English language players.

The game quickly became popular, but several versions were played. In 1924, the Standardization Committee of the American Official Laws of Mah-Jongg was formed. Babcock was an integral member, and the committee published a standardized rule set. Many game sets were then produced in the United States by several companies.

Babcock died in New York City of a heart attack in 1949.

== Works on Mah-Jongg ==
- Babcock, J. P. (1923) [1920]. Babcock's Rules for Mah-Jongg: The Red Book of Rules (Second ed.). San Francisco: Mah-Jongg Sales Company of America.
- Babcock, J. P.; Hartman, L. F.; Foster, R. F.; Smith, John H; Work, Milton C. (1924). "The American Code of Laws for Mah-Jongg". Standardized Mah Jong: A Manual of Tactics for Mixed Hands, Cleared Hands, One-double Game. By Hartman, Lee Foster. New York: Harper & Brothers. pp. 285–305.
