= Three-player mahjong =

Variant of mahjong for fewer players

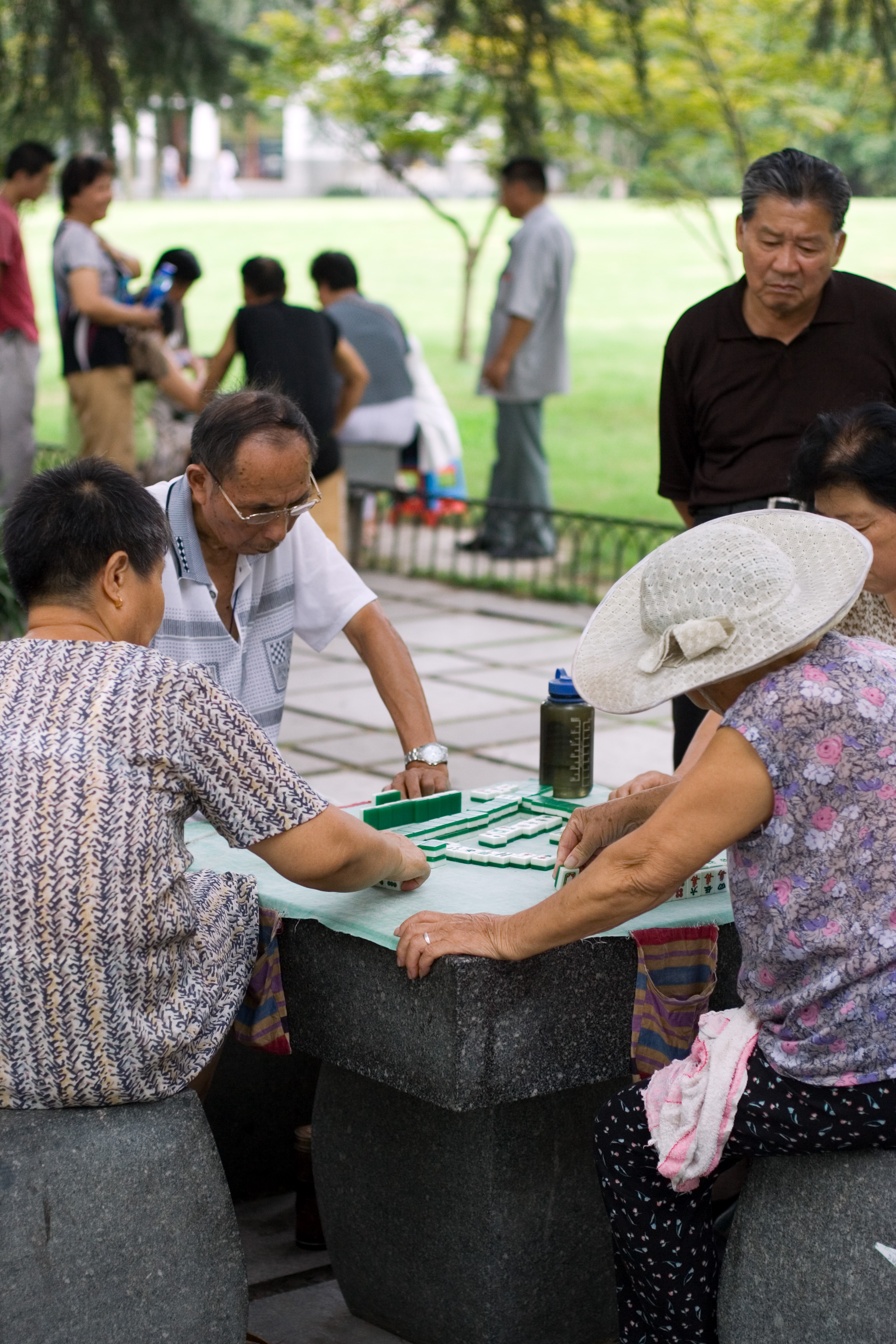
- A game of mahjong being played in Hangzhou, China

Three Player Mahjong
- Players: 3
- Setup time: 2–5 minutes
- Playing time: Dependent on variation and/or house/tournament rules. Fast. 5-15 min.
- Chance: Yes
- Age range: 12 years and older
- Skills: Tactics, observation, memory, risk analysis

Three-player mahjong is an umbrella term for mahjong variants for three players. Three-player mahjong has its own rules and idiosyncrasies that place it apart from the more standard four-player variants. The equipment used and the basic mechanisms are much like four-player variations although some tiles are sometimes removed, certain plays are prohibited and the scoring system is sometimes simplified.

Three-player mahjong is played mostly in Japan, Korea and Malaysia. This article focuses on rules from the earlier two (Japan/Korea) while other variations are covered in the following section. The rules given below are the most commonly used rules in Korean/Japanese three-player mahjong while optional house rules (extra rules which groups may opt to use) are listed afterwards. There are numerous possible house rules, which can be used to make three-player mahjong as simple or complex as players prefer.

== Vanilla three-player rules ==
There are basic rules common among the three-player Mahjong variations played in Korea and Japan. The following presents the most commonly used rules with a list of variations afterwards. Those familiar with common versions of four-player mahjong will note the removal of several tiles (most notably most of the bamboo tiles), chows cannot be melded on a discard, discards are placed in front of the player, a player cannot win on a discard they have previously discarded themselves (sacred discard) and a notably different scoring system.

=== Tiles ===
Three-player mahjong is played with a standard mahjong set with several tiles removed. First, the north wind is removed. The 2-8 of bamboo is also removed. The four season tiles are also removed, but the four flowers are kept. There are no jokers or any other extra tiles.

Circles (dots) 1 to 9:

Characters 1 to 9:

Bamboo 1 and 9 (all four tiles of each; bamboo 2 to 8 are removed):

East, South and West (North is removed):

Red, Green and White Dragons:

The four flowers (there is only one tile of each):

The circles, characters, and bamboo are called simple tiles (they are numbered 1 to 9 and only tiles 1 and 9 are used in the bamboo suit). Of the dragons and winds (called honours), there are three kinds of each with no numerical value. Of both simples and honours, there are four matching tiles for each value (i.e. there are four red dragons and there are four 2 of circles).

=== Deal ===
Tiles are dealt just like other variations of mahjong except the walls are only thirteen or fourteen tiles long and only two dice are used.

==== Stacking tiles ====
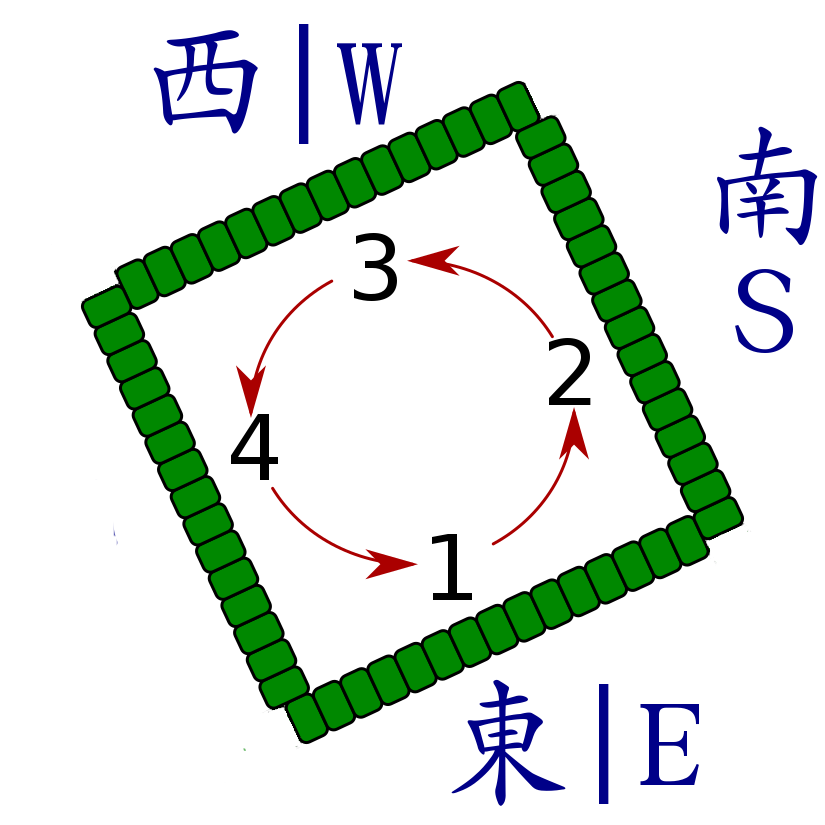
Walls with cardinal directions, including the dealer (E), along with counting order

Each player then stacks a row of 13 or 14 tiles, two tiles high, in front of them (for a total of 26 or 28 tiles). East and West stack a row of 14 tiles, South and North stack a row of 13 tiles. The North wall is stacked by the players. Players then push each side of their stack together to form a square wall. Players may instead more informally build a triangle wall (18 tiles wide on each side – which also allows the use of three dice, if desired, for randomizing the wall cut).

==== Drawing tiles ====
The order of play is traditionally anticlockwise (counterclockwise) but some house rules may go the other direction, as South and North would be swapped when compared to cardinal direction order.

The dealer throws two dice in the square wall and sums up the total. Counting anticlockwise so that the dealer's wall is 1, 5 or 9, South is 2, 6 or 10, etc. This determines which side of the wall will be cut and the tiles dealt from.

Using the same total on the dice, the dealer counts each stack of tiles on that side of the wall from right to left, and cuts the wall to the left of the count. Starting from the left of the cut, the dealer draws four tiles for himself (two stacks of two tiles) so that the wall decreases in a clockwise direction. Players in anticlockwise order draw blocks of four tiles until all players have 12 tiles. Each player then draws one last tile to make a 13-tile hand.

Dealing may be done more informally (without using dice and the dealer randomly cutting the wall wherever they choose). In some house rules the dealer deals out all of the tiles.

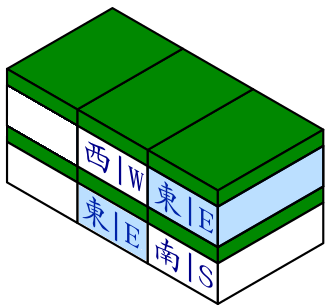
While drawing the 13th tile to complete the initial hand, the dealer (E) will typically also draw a 14th tile (both highlighted in blue) to initiate the game.

=== Objective ===
Each player's hand consists of 13 tiles. In sequence, players pick up a tile from the wall and discard one until a player has a legal hand. The majority of legal hands consists of 4 melds of three tiles and one pair of identical tiles. Melds can also consist of four tiles under certain conditions and there are a few uncommon and very specific winning hands that have a unique composition that break all the rules. These game rules are commonly interrupted by specific plays which include stealing a player's discard, forming a kong, putting a flower tile to the side, and a few other special rules.

=== General play ===
All players start with 13 tiles. The dealer starts the game by drawing the next available tile from the wall (going clockwise around the wall) adding it to their hand. (Typically, this draw is performed during the initial deal to speed up game start.) If this draw does not complete a legal hand, the dealer then discards a tile.

All players must have only 13 tiles in their hand, not including flowers (which are set aside) and the 4th tile of any kong they might have (which is considered an extra tile). Any kong declared or flower set aside, is replaced by a tile from the wall.

After the dealer discards, the next player, in anticlockwise order, draws the next available tile from the wall and discards a tile. Play continues until a player forms a legal, 14-tile hand. Play may be interrupted for any of the following reasons:

=== Hands, rounds, and matches ===
At the end of each hand, the dealership passes to the player to the right (anticlockwise). The dealer is always known as the East player, the player to the right as South, and the third player as West. In other words, your seat direction rotates as the dealer seat rotates.

Three hands make up a round. Thus, in each round, each player is dealer once. Each round is also named after its prevailing wind (East, South and West).

Three rounds make up a match. Thus, the entire match is 9 hands in total (3 hands in the East round + 3 hands in the South round + 3 hands in the West round).

Example of a 9-hand game
Hand Number	Prevailing Wind	Player 1	Player 2	Player 3
1	East	East (dealer)	South	West
2	East	West	East (dealer)	South
3	East	South	West	East (dealer)
4	South	East (dealer)	South	West
5	South	West	East (dealer)	South
6	South	South	West	East (dealer)
7	West	East (dealer)	South	West
8	West	West	East (dealer)	South
9	West	South	West	East (dealer)

Whether the dealer wins or not, or if there is a winner or not, dealership changes each hand.

Unlike other versions of mahjong, being East (or not) does not give any special bonuses (or penalties).

If a hand ends in a draw (goulash hand), however, the winner of the next hand first receives the usual points from his opponents and then an extra 5 points from each opponent. If, instead, there is a second draw (two goulash hands in a row), the winner of the next round receives 10 points from each opponent in addition to their usual points. And so forth.

Players may choose to continue playing a second match after the first one ends (accumulating the points into a double match) or even a triple match (meaning a total of 27 hands).

=== Points ===
The point system is straight forward though may require some time to memorize the various elements. There are two classes of points which are hand-points and bonus points. There is a special class called limit hands which is treated later. In order to win a player needs to have a legal hand which scores the minimum or higher hand-points that players agree on before play (3 hand-points, 6 hand-points, 7 hand-points, etc.)

Unlike many other mahjong variations, only the winner scores and the other players take no points regardless of the content of their hands. Once a player wins he/she adds up all of his/her hand-points. If they meet the minimum hand-points they receive that number of points from the other two players. If they won from a discard then the person who discarded that tile pays for both players (the discarder pays double and the other player pays nothing). The winner then counts his/her bonus points and collects them from both players (even if the game was won on a discard). If a player was waiting for one tile to win, they pay two bonus points less.

=== Limit hand ===
If a player wins on a limit hand, the player scores either the agreed limit (usually 40 points) or a half limit (usually 20 points) and there is no need to total the other points. Limit hands can make or break a match.

=== Hand-points ===
A winning hand must have the minimum number of hand-points agreed on before the match starts. Points are based on specific melds (i.e. chows, pongs) a combination of melds (i.e. two matching pongs, three concealed pongs) or the entire hand (pure hand, seven pairs). Some melds/hands can score more than once (a kong of green dragons score 1 point for being green dragons and another point for being a kong).

==== Hand-points based on melds ====
- 1 point any Dragon Pong
- 1 point extra for having two dragons (three points in total)
- 1 point any Wind Pong
- 1 point more if the wind is players seat wind (two points in total for relevant winds)
- 1 point More if the wind pong is the prevailing wind or round wind (two points in total for relevant winds)
- 1 point every Kong
- 3 points extra for 3 kongs (6 points in total)
- 1 point Pong of 1 or 9 bamboo
- 4 points extra for having both 1 and 9 bamboo (6 points in total)

==== Hand-points based on two or three melds ====
- 2 points for having two identical chows
- 3 points for having 3 concealed pongs/kongs

==== Hand-points based on the complete hand ====
- 3 points for having all pongs/kongs and any pair
- 6 points extra if player has all terminals (1s and 9s) and honours
- 3 points for having a clean hand (hand is made up only of circle tiles and honour tiles or is made of only character and honour tiles)
- 3 points extra if the hand is pure without honours (the hand consists purely of circle tiles or purely of character tiles)
- 3 points for having 7 pairs (special hand consisting of seven different pairs)
- 3 points for having three chows of 1 to 9 in circles or 1 to 9 in characters
- 1 point for having all simples (no honours)
- 2 points extra for having all chows and a pair of simples (three points in total)

==== Hand-points based on revealed/concealed hand ====
- 2 points for having a concealed hand (player did not take an opponent's discard before going mahjong)
- 2 points extra if the concealed is completed by a tile from the wall (four hand-points in total)

=== Bonus-points ===
The winner adds his/her hand-points to all the following bonus points which may apply (which is accumulative). (Both opponents pay)

- 2 points for winning from each player who was not waiting to win. Waiting means waiting for one tile from the wall or a discard that would give a legal hand meeting the minimum required hand-points. Sometimes a player may be able to win with one of two different tiles (exceptionally rarely for three different tiles). A player is not considered "waiting" if the tile they are waiting for has already been discarded (leaving no possibility of receiving that tile).
- 1 point if player wins by a tile from the wall
- 1 point if the tile was the last tile from the wall
- 1 point if the winning tile was used to replace a flower or kong
- 1 point if the winning tile was stolen by another player making a kong
- 1 point for every extra tile player has that matches the tile the player used to win
- 1 point for every flower player has (the number on the flower is not important like other variations)
- 4 points extra if player has all 4 flowers
- 2 points if player has a concealed hand (player scores both hand-points and bonus-points)
- 2 points extra if player has a completely concealed hand (won from the wall and not a discard)
- 2 points if player declared ready
- 2 points extra if a player declared ready and won from the wall

== Optional rules and optional scoring ==
Playing with all the points above and all possible variations is impracticable and complicated. Players chose which points they want to use and will periodically change or add some as long as there is a full consensus. The following variations can be regional. All variations can be incorporated into the basic game.

Experienced players will raise the minimum hand-points needed to four points or more (each time becoming exponentially more challenging). There are a few limit hands. Limit hands are special hands that a player may have which score a set number of points. The amount is high and depends on whatever limit the players set. If playing for stakes, the limit may be low to avoid having to pay large amounts to each other. A couple patterns (13 orphans and heavenly gates), much like seven pairs, are special hands. They are the only three hands a player can have which do not fit the pattern of four melds and an eye (pongs/chows and a pair). They must be concealed hands though may be won on a discard or from the wall. They are optional and players do not need to include them in their game if not desired. A limit hand may effectively end a match if not playing for stakes as players may not be motivated to continue as beating a player who has won a limit has is difficult as winning limit hands (full limits especially) are exceedingly rare.

Only the winner of each game scores points for his/her hand (other players do not score any points but pay points to the winner). The winner will collect his/her total points from each player if he/she wins from the wall (unless a player was declared ready [see below]). If the winner wins on the discard of a player, that player pays the winner and the bonus points for the other player (the other player pays the winner only the hand-points). There are no doubles nor fan systems as in continental versions of mahjong. Points are never doubled for any reason. In the case of a player winning a half limit or limit hand, both players pay the winner (regardless of if there was a discard or not) either the limit or half of the limit (the limit depends on the players though it should be at least 40 points) and if he/she wins on a discard, the player who discards pays double.

Players may place a limit on how many points may be awarded for consecutive goulash hands.

Players in Western countries (in casual play only) may shift the winds from E, S, W to N, E S (removing the West wind instead of the North wind and having the dealer as North) to align with Western culture centering their compass on the North.

=== Limit hands ===
Hands are optional and players may use all hands or choose based on consensus which ones to use. As all are difficult and the limit hands being very rare, all hands are included by most experienced players.

==== Half limit ====
- Two dragons and a pair of the other dragon (little dragons)
- Two winds and a pair of the other winds (little winds)
- All bamboo and honours
- At least one terminal in all sets and honours
- Pure hand with pong of seat dragon or wind (concealed)
- Four concealed pongs
- Three kongs and a pair of honours
- Little Jade Dragon (pair of five bamboo with the green dragon)
- Three concealed Kongs
- Four Kongs (concealed or not)

==== Full limit ====
- All honours and or Terminals
- Great Dragons (all three dragons)
- Great Winds (all three winds)
- Pong of 1 and 9 bamboo and pair of five bamboo
- Four concealed kongs
- Thirteen orphans (1 and 9 of each suit, one of each dragon, one of each wind and a pong of any one of these elements)
- Nine gates is a concealed hand of 1112345678999 tiles in one suit, and winning on any extra tile of the same suit
- Pearl Dragon (all circles and a pong/kong of the white dragon, note pair must also be circles)
- Ruby Dragon (all character tiles and a pong/kong of the red dragon, note pair must also be characters)
- Great Jade Dragon (pong of 1 and 9 bamboo with the green dragon)

=== Dead wall ===
Thirteen tiles are not used in the game and are placed to the side. The dealer turns over one piece. The next tile in sequence is considered a dora (having any of those pieces in a hand will give a bonus point). For example, if the tile turned over is a 3 circle, then all 4 circles will be considered dora and having a pong of 4 circles will score 3 bonus points. If a 9 is turned over then the 1 circle is considered a dora. The sequence of dragons is green, red, white, green (i.e. if a red dragon is turned over, the white dragons are dora tiles). The sequence of winds is north, east, south, north. If a flower tile is turned over then all flower tiles score two bonus points in total and having all three (as the flower turned over is considered a part of the dead wall and not used during the game) then the usual eight bonus points in total are given.

=== North Wind as normal piece ===
The North wind is kept in play but can only be used as a pair (scoring two points) or as a kong (scoring six points). A player cannot call mahjong if they have only a pong of the North. Winning a hand by drawing or stealing a North win scores two extra bonus points. The North wind is considered an honour tile but there is no round of North nor a North prevailing wind or a North seat position. North Wind is not part of the three little or three big winds limit hand but is part of the 13 orphans limit hand as well as the all-honours hand.

=== All bamboos removed ===
All bamboo tiles are removed

=== Three declared ready ===
If all three players declare ready, depending on the variation, either that particular game is considered a draw, or the winner only wins his hand-points from the other players.

=== Dora Tiles ===
There are two forms of dora which may optionally be used in three-player mahjong.

==== Red Dora Tiles ====
In some Japanese mahjong sets, one five circles tile is coloured red and one five characters tile is coloured red (the other matching three of each tile is the normal colour). There are thus only two of these tiles. A player who has one red dora tile in their hand scores one bonus point, and if they have both red dora tiles they score six bonus points (in total). These dora tiles count as bonus points and do not count as hand-points nor towards the minimum hand-points needed to go mahjong.

===== Revealed Dora Tiles =====
The second form of dora which is distinct from the first, is the revealing of one tile from the wall before the game begins. If a simple tile is revealed, then the next tile in order becomes a dora tile (i.e. if the 5 circles is revealed, then all 6 circles become dora...or if the 2 character tiles are revealed, then the 3 characters become dora). If a nine is revealed then the 1 of the same suit becomes dora. If a 1 bamboo is revealed then a 9 bamboo becomes dora. If a wind is revealed then the next wind in compass order becomes dora. If a dragon is revealed then the next dragon in alphabetical order becomes dora: Green-Red-White-Green.

A player scores one bonus point for each of these dora tiles used in the winning hand. The player scores one extra point if the player forms the eye using these tiles, two extra points if the player forms a pong, and scores six extra points if the player forms a kong using these tiles.

The red dora tiles are considered distinct from the revealed dora tiles and they should not be confused with each other. Table rules might include the red dora tiles but not the revealed dora tiles or the reverse. If table rules include both dora tiles, care should be taken not to mix the points scored for having them in their winning hand but to do so separately.

==== Dummy hand ====
The last thirteen tiles of the wall are not used in the game (considered an invisible fourth player).

== Variations from specific regions ==
=== Honshū and other parts of Japan ===
Popular in the western part of Honshu, three-player Japanese mahjong incorporates a few changes which make it more suited to three players and simplified from four-player mahjong. There is no ghost player. Players need a minimum of one yaku to win. Refer to the article on Japanese Mahjong for unique Japanese playing concepts such as dora and furiten.

Tiles 2 through 8 are removed from the character suit. Chii cannot be melded. All four winds are used. Flowers are optional and not normally used. The dora indicator is the fifth tile from the left. Kandora, uradora, and akadora work as in four-player mahjong. The North wind also acts as a dora (Pei-dora) when it is exposed and set aside, or it may also be discarded as a safe tile (although an opponent may rob a concealed kan or a declared / discarded North tile to win with kokushi musou). If the Pei dora is set aside with a declaration (with a call of "Pei!" or "Nuki!"), a replacement tile is drawn from the dead wall, just as when declaring a kan.

Once all North wind tiles are exposed another dora tile is revealed in the dead wall, which consists of fourteen tiles as in four-player mahjong. A player cannot use a discard to win if his hand, prior to using the discard, does not contain a yaku (atozuke-nashi).

One-Han Yaku

- Yakuhai (A pon / kan of dragons, one's own wind, or the prevailing wind) (If a tile counts for both, it counts as 2 yakuhai.)
- Iipeikou (Two identical chii in one suit)
- Pinfu (A concealed hand consisting of four chii with a non-yakuhai pair and able to win with more than one possible tile)
- Riichi (Declaring ready; the hand cannot be modified (i.e., no concealed kans)
- Tanyao (No honours or terminals)
- Haitei / Houtei (Winning with the last tile of the round) (Specifically, haitei is a tsumo of the final tile in the live wall, while houtei is a ron on that last possible discard.)
- Rinshan kaihou (Winning with a kan or Pei-dora replacement tile)
- Chankan (Robbing the kan)

Two-Han Yaku

- Chanta (Honours or terminals in every set)
- Chiitoitsu (Seven different pairs)
- Daburu riichi (Declaring riichi on one's first turn)
- Ikki tsuukan (Tiles 1–9 in one suit)
- San'ankou (Three concealed pon) (Winning on the tile needed to complete the third pon doesn't count)
- Sankantsu (Three kan)
- Iisou sanjun (Three identical chii in one suit)
- Toitoihou (All pon or kan, on chii)

3-Han Yaku

- Hon'iisou (One suit with honours)
- Junchan (Terminals in every set)
- Sanrenkou (Three sequential pon in one suit) (Do not count the groups as three chii. Count them as three pon.)

4-Han Yaku

- Shousangen (Little three dragons) (Two pon/kan of dragons and a pair of the last)

5-Han Yaku

- Honroutou (Honours and terminals only)

6-Han Yaku

- Chin'iisou (One suit only)

Yakuman (Limit)

- Chiihou (Winning as a non-dealer with one's first drawn tile)
- Chinroutou (All terminals)
- Chuuren poutou (Nine gates)
- Daisangen (Big three dragons)
- Suushiihou (Big / little four winds)
- Kokushi musou (Thirteen orphans)
- Paarenchan (Winning after staying the dealer 8 times in a row with any legal hand)
- Ryuuiisou ("All green"; a hand consisting of only 2, 3, 4, 6, or 8 of souzu and hatsu tiles)
- Suukantsu (Four kan; won immediately after the fourth kan is made, even without a pair)
- Suuankou (Four concealed pon)
- Tsuuiisou (All honours)

Double Yakuman

- Kokushi musou, without having discarded any of the tiles previously nor having claimed a North wind tile as Pei-dora
- Suuankou, winning with a single tile to form a pair

Triple Yakuman

- Chuuren poutou, without having discarded any such tiles previously
- Tenhou (Winning as the dealer with one's first drawn tile)

Bonus Han

- Bazoro (2 bonus han for winning)
- Dora (including uradora, kandora, kan-uradora, Pei-dora, and / or akadora)
- Ippatsu (Winning within one round of declaring riichi, with no opponent pon / kan / Pei-dora in the interim)

Scoring, though simplified, is somewhat complex.

Scoring Table
Han	Ron (payment to ko)	Ron (payment to oya)	Tsumo (payment to ko from ko / oya)	Tsumo (payment to oya from ko)
3 (1 excluding bazoro)	1000	1500	300 / 500	500
4 (2 excluding bazoro)	2000	3000	500 / 1000	1000
5 (3 excluding bazoro)	4000	6000	1000 / 2000	2000
6-7 (Mangan) (4-5 excluding bazoro)	8000	12000	2000 / 4000	4000
8-9 (Haneman) (6-7 excluding bazoro)	12000	18000	3000 / 6000	6000
10-12 (Baiman) (8-10 excluding bazoro)	16000	24000	4000 / 8000	8000
13-15 (Sanbaiman) (11-13 excluding bazoro)	24000	36000	6000 / 12000	12000
Yakuman (Yakuman or 16 or more han) (14+ han excluding bazoro)	32000	48000	8000 / 16000	16000
Double Yakuman	64000	96000	16000 / 32000	32000
Triple Yakuman	96000	144000	24000 / 48000	48000

=== Malaysia ===
Malaysian 3-player mahjong is played with only circles and honours, as well as the extra eight flowers in a Malaysian mahjong set ("face" and "animal" tiles) and jokers ("fly" (飛) tiles), for a total of 84 tiles. There is no fixed game length and the dealer is the winner of the previous round.

A winning hand must be worth 5 fan, to a maximum of 10, earned thusly:

- One face or animal / All four faces or animals: 1
- Four flowers / Four seasons: 1
- Own flower or season: 1
- "Bamboo" flower or "Winter" season: 1
- Pung of dragons / own wind / North / East: 1 (note: the prevailing wind is always East)
- Little three dragons: 3
- One suit with honors: 1
- One suit only: 3
- All chows with pair of circles: 1
- All pungs / kongs: 2
- Winning with kong / flower replacement tile: 1
- Seven pairs: 1
- Stealing kong: 1
- Nine gates: 10 (note: must only be won by self-draw)
- Big / little four winds: 10 (note: "pao" rule applies)
- No flowers / seasons / faces / animals: 10
- Four kongs: 10
- Big three dragons: 10 (note: "pao" rule applies)
- Winning with kong replacement tile after two consecutive kongs: 10
- Four concealed pungs / kongs: 10 (note: must only be won by self-draw)
- Four fly: 10 (note: this only applies to one's starting hand, or else the player must win after drawing four fly tiles later)
- Winning with one's first or last tile: 10
- All honors: 10 (note: "pao" rule applies)
- All flowers / seasons / faces / animals: 10

Winning the hand earns 100 points, with 20 additional points for every fan. Both players pay the winner double this value if the hand is won by self-draw but if by discard only the discarder does so (the other pays the normal value). Kongs immediately score from the other players 100 points if concealed and 50 if open / promoted (open kong points are paid by the discarder for both players). A full set of bonus tiles in one's starting hand also earns an immediate 100 points, or 50 if drawn later. If the winning player does not score 10 fan the non-winner whose hand would have less than 5 fan (going by the first 5 fan in the list above) pays the other non-winner the score of the more valuable hand; if both non-winners' hands are worth more than 5 fan they only pay the difference. Fly tiles earn 50 points as a final bonus score for all players.

== Changes in dynamics ==
The game dynamics in three-player mahjong, regardless of the rule set vary based on speed, the use of tiles, point keeps, using ghost players or not and how the lack of a fourth seat wind is dealt with.

=== Speed ===
The game is always faster. With one less hand and more tiles available to the other players, the game can be finished quicker.

=== Wall ===
The wall remains the same, though playing with dead walls depends on the variation and the players. In very casual play the wall can consist of three sides.

=== Pieces ===
In some variations an entire suit is removed. In Malaysian mahjong only the circles and honours are used. In Korean mahjong one suit is removed or in other variations as well as in Japan, numbers 2-8 is removed from one suit. This radically changes the dynamics making certain hands more common such as single suited hands and hands without chows.

=== East ===
In many versions east scores or pays double (a little more complicated in Japanese scoring), however in Korean scoring and Korean/Japanese scoring, there is no doubling of any kind.

=== Ghost player ===
In some versions there is a ghost player, meaning 13 tiles are not used in the wall to mimic the lack of tiles in 4 player versions. This player also takes one of the four winds, (though no tiles are dealt out to any ghost player nor are points given). In Korean, Japanese and Korean/Japanese mahjong, there is no ghost player and all tiles are used during the games.

=== Dragons ===
In some variations, each player has a seat dragon as well as a seat wind which changes the point structure. There is however never a prevailing dragon even if there is a prevailing wind. When there is a seat dragon, East is green, South is red and West is white (fortunately it follows in alphabetical order in English from dealer to last player).

=== Melded (or declared) chows ===
In some variations these are not allowed. Only pongs and kongs in three-player games can be melded (or declared) meaning a chow can only be formed by a discard on winning.

In Korean mahjong, three-player Japanese mahjong and in Korean/Japanese mahjong, melded chows are never allowed except if done to complete a hand.

=== Social nature ===
It is far more social and less likely to be played for stakes as it is looked down on as a less serious version of mahjong. However, in some versions such as Korean/Japanese three player, the rules can be intricate or complex and playing for small or large stakes forces the players to try to make more complex hands.

== Point systems ==
The point system may or may not change depending on the variation of mahjong. In some variations a higher minimum point is expected or less points are given for certain hands. Table rules are common in three-player versions and a comprehensive list of variations or versions would be a massive undertaking not in the known works in any. In Hong Kong Mahjong, the doubling system is used in which certain points pay off a certain amount of money which doubles each subsequent level. For instance 1 or 2 points pay nothing. 3 or 4 points pay one unit, 5 or 6 points pay two units, 7 to 10 points pay 4 units and anything more pays 8 units. The Japanese system is rather complicated, though is simplified in the three-player version. The Korean system and Korean/Japanese system is a simple 'pay a unit per point' to the winner.

== Rule agreement ==
The most common rule sets are Korean, Japanese and Malaysian mahjong rulesets. Korean/Japanese mahjong has a comprehensive set of rules well attuned for three-player gaming. The Malaysian version is a very simplified way for social playing. Players will decide their own rules over time.

== History ==
Three-player mahjong is probably as old as mahjong itself, though it is speculated that mahjong originated as a game for only two players. Korean/Japanese three-player mahjong, played in east Asia is an amalgamation of Old Korean mahjong rules (which traditionally omitted the bamboo suit and did not allow melded chows and had a very simple scoring system) with some elements of Japanese rules including sacred discard (a player cannot rob a piece to win if he discarded it before) and many bonus points. Korean mahjong in the past included many elements of both traditional Chinese mahjong and the Japanese scoring system. The rules have changed and there are no standard rules, though this variation shown here reflects the old rules though adapted for modern three player play (as Koreans include some or all bamboo pieces now). An experienced player should be able to read the recap at the bottom of this section and understand the rules well. Inexperienced players would need to read the following to understand the game.

== Motivations ==
One of the motivations for playing with three players, is that finding a fourth may be difficult or that having one cancelling player (for a four-player game) ruins the possibility of playing at all and thus knowing how to play three-player mahjong means players can play, or always playing three-player mahjong limits the likelihood of someone cancelling. However, the dynamics of playing with three players is also a good motivation, especially when playing traditional Korean rules.
