= Dryer =

Dryer (or drier) may refer to:

== Drying equipment ==
- Hair dryer, also called blow dryer
- Hand dryer
- Clothes dryer, also known as a tumble-dryer
- Clothes horse, also known as a drying rack
- Belt dryer
- Desiccant, a substance that absorbs or adsorbs water
- Grain dryer, for storage grain bins
- Oil drying agent, an additive which accelerates the film formation of a drying oil

== Other ==
- Dryer (surname)
- Dryer (band), a Saratoga Springs, NY based band

== See also ==
- Drying
- Dreier (disambiguation)
- Dreyer
