= Treyer =

Treyer is a last name of German origin. Other forms of the name are "Dreier" and "Dreyer". The Pennsylvania German form of it is "Troyer". Hans Treyer, an early Anabaptist leader, died as a martyr of his faith in Bern in 1529.

Treyer is the last name of:

- Gottlieb Treyer (1790–1869), a German-born British snuff manufacturer and retailer.
- Tobias Treyer, Swiss curler.

== See also ==
- Fribourg & Treyer, a former British snuff manufacturer and retailer.
