= Troyer =

Troyer is a last name of German origin which is widespread among the Amish, Brethren and the Mennonites. It is the Pennsylvania German form of the German last name "Dreier", "Dreyer", "Treyer" or "Dreher". A Dreher in German is a traditional operator of a rotating cutting machine.

Hans Treyer, an early Anabaptist leader, died as a martyr of his faith in Bern in 1529. Beginning at around 1733, some Treyers (now Troyer) moved from Europe to Pennsylvania, settling in Berks County.

Troyer is the last name of:

- Baracuda (rapper) (born Graham Troyer, 1983), Canadian hip hop artist
- Braeden Troyer (born 1993), American soccer player
- Carlos Troyer (1837–1920), German-born American musician and composer of traditional Native American melodies
- Eric Troyer (born 1949), American singer-songwriter and keyboardist
- Ferdinand Troyer (1780–1851), Austrian noble, philanthropist, and amateur clarinettist
- John Troyer (1753–1842), Canadian-born American farmer, businessman, medical practitioner, and exorcist
- John Troyer (fighter) (born 1985), American mixed martial artist
- Maynard Troyer (1938–2018), American race car driver
- Noah Troyer (1831–1886), American Amish Mennonite "sleeping preacher"
- Robert Troyer (born 1960), American attorney and politician
- Verne Troyer (1969–2018), American actor, comedian, and stunt performer
- Warner Troyer (1932–1991), Canadian broadcast journalist and writer

== See also ==
- De Troyer (disambiguation), a similar surname
- Hereditary spastic paraplegia, also known as Troyer syndrome
- Troyer Amish, a subgroup of Old Order Amish
