= Königrufen =

Austrian Card game of the tarot family

- The Game of Kings
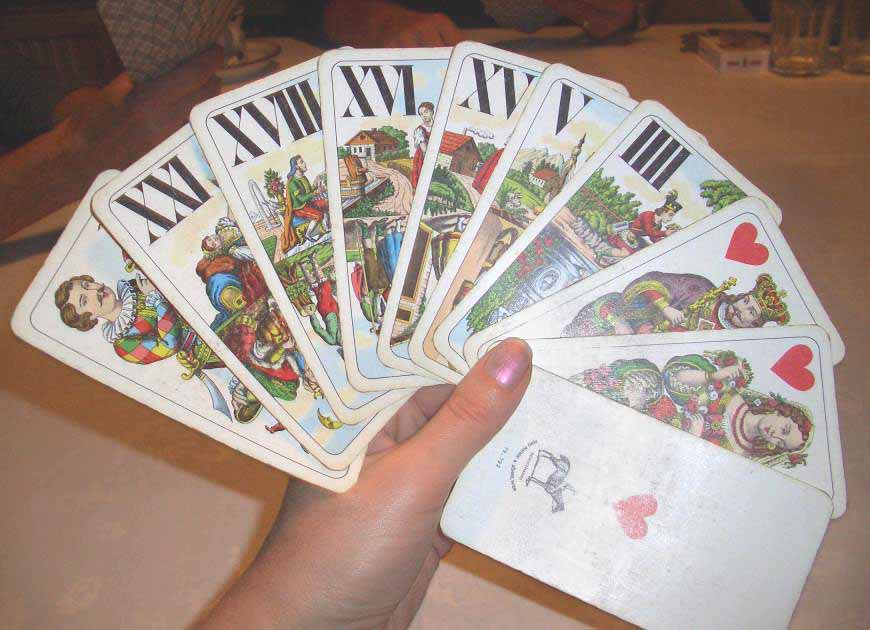
- Origin: Austria
- Type: Trick-taking
- Players: 4
- Skills: Tactics, Strategy
- Age range: 12+
- Cards: 54
- Deck: Industrie und Glück
- Rank (high→low): Tarocks: Sküs, XXI-I ♣♠K Q C V 10 9 8 7 ♥♦ K Q C V 1 2 3 4
- Play: Counter-clockwise
- Playing time: ca. 5 min. per deal
- Chance: Moderate

Related games
- Tapp Tarock • Neunzehnerrufen

Königrufen or Königsrufen (German: "Calling the King") is a four-player, trick-taking card game of the tarot family, played in Austria and South Tyrol, with a pack of 54 cards and variants for two, three and six players. As with other regional tarot card games, it is usually called Tarock (the German term for tarot card games) by its players. It is the only variant of Tarock that is played over most of Austria and, in 2001, was the most popular card game in Austria after Schnapsen and Rommé. By 2015, it had become "the favourite card game of Austrians". It has been described as the most interesting tarot game for four players, the "Game of Kings", a game that requires intelligence and, with 22 trumps in play, as good "training for the brain".

In comparison with other card games, Königrufen may be played with a wide range of possible contracts. The name of the game comes from the practice in the most basic contracts of naming a specific King in order to choose a playing partner, known as "calling a King". In most contracts the four players form two sides – either two against two or one against three – who compete to score the majority of the card points. According to the rules, the 54 cards have a total value of 70 points.

Although the basic rules of Austrian Königrufen are common, the contract announcements and bonuses and their values have a large number of variations. Many individual regions and families play by their own house rules. In addition, more widely accepted tournament rules have emerged, although these vary considerably from region to region. This makes Königrufen the most varied of all the Tarock games. Regular tournament series have been held since the 1990s and, since 2008, an annual Austrian Final has taken place. The game's stronghold is Upper Austria, which also hosts the Austrian final.

In a broader sense, the term Königrufen may be used for a family of closely related tarot games whose other members are mainly played in other regions of the former Habsburg monarchy, most notably in Slovenia.

Modern pack of Tarock cards by Piatnik; Industrie und Glück design, Type 6 by Josef Neumayer, 1890

== History ==
=== Background ===
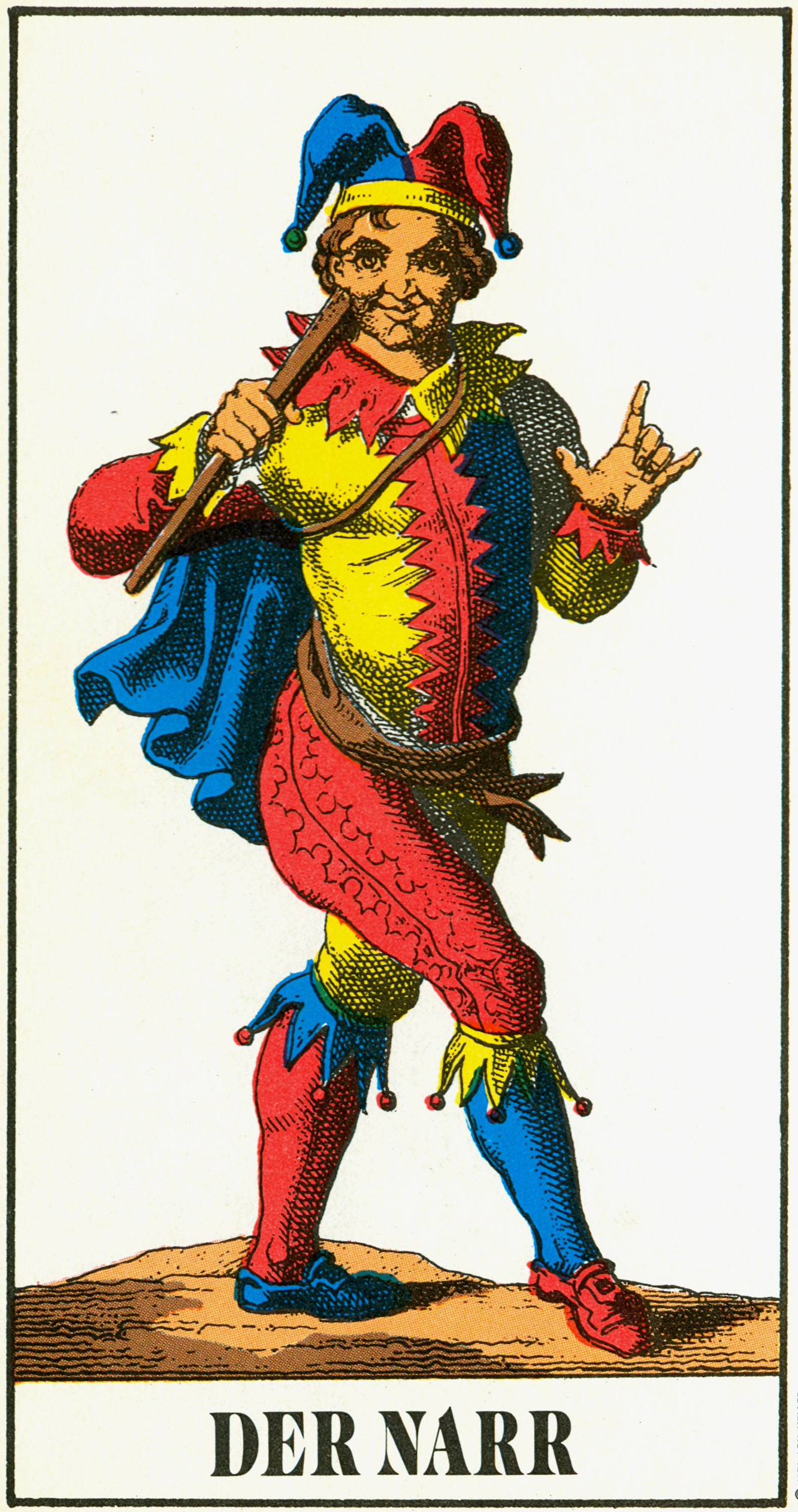
The Fool as used today in the game of Troggu

The original form of the Tarock card game family emerged in Northern Italy during the Early Renaissance, first evidenced in 1440. The most important feature of the new game was that 21 permanent trump cards, the trionfi, were added to the existing suits. Today these trump cards are also called Tarock in German-speaking countries and are usually numbered with Roman numerals. In addition to the trumps, a valuable card called the "Fool" was added, to which special rules applied. The Fool is often wrongly regarded as a precursor of the Joker in modern card games. Called L'Excuse in French, since it was played with a ritualized apology, it was later changed to Sküs in German.

According to the oldest known French rules of 1637 Tarock (or tarot in French) was a trick-taking card game for three players using 78 cards of designated values, the players vying with each other to score as many points as possible. In its heyday from about 1730 to 1830 Tarock was played with this rule framework across a large part of Europe. In addition, variants were developed for four players with two teams of two – usually similar in principle to the game of Troccas that is still widespread today in Grisons.

From the middle of the 18th century onwards, especially in the German-speaking world and in the Habsburg monarchy, the Tarock game went through a series of profound reforms:

- The most important innovation, introduced by the Spanish card game L'Hombre, was the principle of bidding (in most German card games called bieten or reizen, but in Austrian Tarock usually lizitieren). Now players competed in an auction, before the actual game started, in order to be able to play against an alliance of the others, the defenders. From the four-player version of L'Hombre, Quadrille, came the idea of choosing a partner by "calling" for a King (hence König-rufen which literally means "King calling"). Tarock variants such as the German Tarok Quadrille and the Italian Chiamare il re, whose name means the same as "Königrufen", were based on this principle.
- The 78-card pack was stripped to make it easier to handle by omitting the lowest suit cards. This is how the 54-card pack, now produced almost exclusively in Central Europe, was created. Other Tarock variants also stripped out various (higher or lower) numbers of suit cards.
- The Sküs lost its role as a special card and became the 22nd and highest trump card, while retaining its high value as well as its form and name.
- A talon was introduced, possibly from other card games, from which the winner of the auction could improve his hand.
- As an additional element, a bonus was introduced when the smallest tarock, the Pagat, won the last trick. In Austria, a rule was added that this could also be announced before the game as "Pagat Ultimo" or "Pagat zum Schluss".
- The cards also changed in appearance: they used a French pack instead of Latin playing cards. The traditional motifs of the trump cards, known today mainly in the Tarot pack, were replaced by pictures of animals, vedute, social scenes or other images.

The culmination of this development was the game of Tapp Tarock, once very popular in southern Germany and Austria, and considered a good introduction to Tarock games, but now only widespread in certain regions. In Tapp Tarock, each of the three players is dealt 16 cards and 6 cards form the talon. Players bid to be able to play against the other two using six, three or none of the cards from the talon.

=== Emergence and development ===
The earliest reference to a four-handed variant of Tapp-Tarock involving the calling of a King occurs in an 1827 book, but by then it had presumably been played for several decades. Königrufen was devised as a four-player variant of Tapp Tarock with each player being dealt 12 cards instead of 16, but the talon still comprising six cards. As in the variants mentioned above, the principle for choosing partners in Königrufen was adopted from Quadrille.

The first description of Königrufen is found in 1827 in an appendix to the second edition of the book Anweisung zur gründlichen Erlernung des beliebten Tarok-Tappen-Spiels sowohl durch genaue Bestimmung aller Regeln und Feinheiten, als auch durch die Beobachtung und Auseinandersetzung mehrerer angeführter, sehr schwieriger Beyspiele ("Instructions for a thorough learning of the popular Tarok Tappen game, both by clear explanation of all rules and details, as well as by the observation and discussion of several accompanying, very challenging examples"). The first edition of 1821 (which contains the first known description of Tapp Tarock) had not mentioned Königrufen, from which it may be assumed that there had been a rise in the popularity of the game during the 1820s. Until recently, the second edition had been thought to have been lost; it was only made public in 2010, when the Lower Austrian State Library (Niederösterreichische Landesbibliothek) was able to acquire a copy from the Tax and Customs Museum in Rotterdam.

According to these rules, the 'forehand', i.e. the player who started the auction and led to the first trick, could announce a Tapper if he had a poor hand of cards. This was the lowest ranking contract in Tapp Tarock where the forehand was allowed to pick up all six cards from the talon if no one bid a higher contract. However, because it was all too easy to win, this contract was already obsolete in Tapp Tarock and was not actually played; instead a win was paid out to the player at a low rate; this was also done in Königrufen.

With better cards, the forehand could either call a King, announce a Dreyer (play three cards from the talon against the three other players) or a Solo, which at that time did not mean the same as today's Solo Rufer but a Solo Dreier – where the declarer played alone against the other three without using cards from the talon. The other players could also bid these contracts.

Until the original source from 1827 had been recovered, the 1829 Neueste Allgemeine Spielbuch ("Latest General Book of Games") was the oldest known source for Königrufen which, as it turned out, contained an edited copy of the 1827 rules under the heading Tappen mit König oder Tarokrufen ("Tappen with King or Tarock Call"). From this, Tarock experts assumed that a King or a high tarock could be 'called' in the original form of the game. This turned out to be wrong with the appearance of the 1827 rules, in which only a King could be called. In the event that the called King was beaten by the opponents (or remained in the talon), a high penalty had to be paid. This was felt to be so harsh by Königrufen players that some of them used to call Tarock XX instead, the loss of which was far less of a worry and, if it were lost, was only of low value anyway. This is what the 1829 rules say:

Section 14. All the prevailing difficulties with Königrufen have led to the practice of calling a high tarock instead of a King, which the player gives up in the order Tarock XX, XIX, XVIII or XVII, and whose loss is not such a risk.

This created a new line of Tarock games that developed into Zwanzigerrufen, Neunzehnerrufen and Hungarian Tarock. Meanwhile, in Königrufen, "King Capture" (Königfang) was usually scrapped, or if retained, its consequences were largely mitigated.

Book cover detail of the Illustrirtes Wiener Tarokbuch of 1899

In 1840, the first book that dealt exclusively with Königrufen was published in Vienna: Thorough and easy-to-understand instructions for learning the popular game of Königrufen Tarock, or the art of learning to play the same in a short time, both theoretically and practically, according based on rules and examples. However, the rules differed considerably – in this description of Königrufen, players could only announce Rufer ("Caller") contracts, namely as a Dreier (with three cards from the talon) or as a Solo without talon. If you wanted to play alone, you could call a King in your own hand.

Different bidding contracts have survived a long time. In the book Der praktische Tarockspieler ("The Practical Tarock Player") by Moriz Bermann (1894) three different contracts are presented, two of which correspond roughly to the above; in the third, two cards or even just one could be taken from the talon. However, a combination of Rufer and soloist games was to prevail, in each of which three cards from the talon or none (Solo contracts) could be played. In the 2nd edition of Sigmund Ulmann's Illustrirtem Wiener Tarokbuch, only the forehand could play a Rufer with talon and without further announcements. Above this, a Rufer with Pagat and a Solo Rufer without a talon could be played. Even higher in the auction was the Dreier, which had now freed itself meaningfully from the three talon cards and became the name for soloist games against three defenders; and the highest game was therefore the Solo Dreier without talon. By now, this was the basic structure of the game as it is today, with the difference that today, a Pagat Rufer always ranks higher than a Solo Rufer in the auction.

=== Transition to modern Königrufen ===
Today's Königrufen has many more contracts than its predecessor, including those that can be played even with a weak hand of cards. Many of these have been imported from other card games during a long process that went on throughout the 20th century. As Königrufen boomed in the period between 1880 and 1920, it evolved into a form with just four possible bids: two with a partner and two solo. In each case the lower (easier) bid enabled the declarer to expose the talon and choose 3 of the cards; the upper (harder) bid was played without looking at the talon.

As time went on, more and more contracts were added, many of which were 'negative games' where the aim was not to win tricks or to win just one, such as Piccolo. Today there are no less than 13 contracts permitted in the Austrian Final which range in game value from 1 to 8 game points. In addition there are 8 special bonuses which include four 'Birds'.

==== Development of the birds ====
The four lowest trumps from an 18th-century animal Tarock pack

Eagle on a modern card by Piatnik, 1890 motif

Rare Double Eagle version, Ludwig Jäger, c. 1880

The (usually four) lowest tarocks are called Birds (Vögel, usually dialectically Vogerln = "little birds"). Their special feature is the bonus to be made from the final tricks of the game, corresponding to their respective number. Thus if Tarock I wins the last trick or Tarock II wins the penultimate trick, etc., the player earns a bonus. Consequently, there is also a penalty for losing a bird in such an attempt.

The oldest bird is the Tarock I, the Pagat. Its role in the last trick is clearly older than Königrufen itself. It was first attested in Italy during the 16th century. It has been known as bagatto ultimo in Piedmont since the 18th century. At that time Milan belonged to the Habsburg monarchy, and in this way the bonus and the term came to Austria. There it was further introduced that the Pagat ultimo can also be declared beforehand, very probably taken from a similar announcement in Hundertspiel, an Austrian version of the originally Italian card game, Trappola. The Pagat ultimo became a characteristic feature of almost all Tarock variants in the Habsburg Empire.

Although there were already similar bonuses in Hundertspiel, it was only in the 20th century that the idea arose of extending the bonus of the Pagat ultimo to higher tarocks and earlier tricks, initially to the Eagle Owl (Uhu). In 1937, this name was first used for the Tarock II in Franz Unger's Kleiner Lehrbuch des Tarockes in seinen schönsten Arten ("Little Textbook of Tarock in its Best Ways"); there, however, the bonus was awarded for playing the Owl in the last trick. Later, the penultimate trick became the norm.

Traditionally, the term 'Eagle Owl' was assumed to be a humorous nickname for the eagle on the card, itself inspired by the Austrian imperial eagle, and analogous to the term 'cuckoo' (Kuckuck) being used for a pledge seal. However, research revealed that the term first appeared in 1902 in Hungary in the card game Alsós, a variant of Jass for three players, which was heavily influenced by Tarock and was also played in Austria under the name Vannakspiel. There, the Deuce of Bells was called the Eagle Owl and a bonus was awarded if it took the penultimate trick. Why it was called an eagle owl is unclear; the same word, Uhu, is used in Hungarian for an eagle owl, but its connexion with playing cards is not clear.

From the game of Alsós the concept was transferred to Hungarian Tarock and was part of an essential refinement of the game in the 1920s, which led to the variant, Illustrated Hungarian Tarock. Now the Pagát uhu could also be played, i.e. the Pagat in the penultimate trick. The migration of the term to Austria seems to have led to its meaning being transferred to the Tarock II. Apparently in analogy to the eagle owl, the Pagat was now nicknamed the 'Sparrow', which gave rise to the concept of "Birds". It was now obvious to include higher tarocks as well. This happened several times independently, resulting in several different names for the higher "Birds". Often bird names with the appropriate number of syllables were preferred. Thus the names Cockatoo (Kakadu), Pelican (Pelikan) and Canary (Kanari), among others, were coined for the Tarock III. For the Tarock IIII, names included Marabou (Marabu i.e. the Marabou Stork), Bearded Vulture (Lammergeier), Cock-a-Doodle-Doo (Kikeriki) and Wild Boar (Wildsau); however Quapil, a German family name of Czech origin (from kvapil = "he has hurried") has become generally accepted. In this case, too, it is unclear how this became the name of the card.

Playing up to the Quapil is the norm today; of the larger player communities the Raiffeisen Tarock Cup was the last to introduce it, in 2022. But some circles even play the Tarock V or VI as a Bird, the former being referred to as the Dodo (Dronte).

== Present-day situation ==
Tournament locations in Austria in 2011/12. Blue: Raiffeisen Tarock Cup; Green: Hausruckviertler Tarock Cup; Red: Wiener Zeitung Tarock Cup; Violet: Tiroler Tarock Cup; Orange: Austria Finals; Yellow: other tournaments; large dots: more than one tournament held here

Austrian law views Königrufen – like all variants of Tarock card games – as a game of skill (i.e. it depends more on the ability of the player than on chance), which is why it does not contravene the act on gambling monopolies despite usually involving (small) amounts of money being wagered.

Since 2004, it has also been possible to play Königrufen online at the game platform GameTwist.at (formerly Stargames.at).

=== Tournaments ===
Only in relatively recent years have tournaments been organised for Königrufen. Since 1995, the Raiffeisen Tarock Cup has been held annually in Upper Austria (especially in the district of Mühlviertel). In 1997, the Hausruckviertel Tarock Cup began, which also includes parts of the state of Salzburg. These two cups use largely identical rules and from September to March each year they jointly organize just over 50 tournaments with up to 300 participants each. With the number of competitors in four figures, this makes Upper Austria the stronghold of Austrian Königrufen.

The largest competition outside Upper Austria is the Wiener Zeitung Tarock Cup, founded in 2002, initially held as the Vienna Tarock Cup (Wiener Tarockcup) with three tournaments and supported by the daily newspaper, Die Presse. Since 2005, it has been sponsored by the Wiener Zeitung and since then also bears their name. It became the umbrella for all public Königrufen tournaments in Vienna and Lower Austria, with occasional tournaments in Carinthia and Hungary. In addition, there is the smaller Tyrolean Tarock Cup (Tiroler Tarockcup) which began in 2008. In Styria, there has been a Tarot Cup since 2013, which is currently being sponsored by Casino Graz.

=== Austria Final ===
Since 2008, there has been an annual Austria Final (Österreich-Finale) in April in the Casino Linz, in which over 200 of the best players from the various cup competitions compete for the title of Austrian Tarock Champion (Österreichischer Tarockmeister). The competition uses the rules from the Hausruckviertl Tarock Cup. The top three to date have been:

Year	First	Second	Third
2008	Manfred Huemer	Hubert Zauner	Thomas Walter Angerer
2009	Manfred Doppler	Josef Brugger	Josef Wenninger
2010	Hermann Manzenreiter	Manfred Huemer	Josef Mülleder
2011	Markus Leimhofer	Karl Schilcher	Hermann Manzenreiter
2012	Josef Böckl	Markus Jungwirth	Christian Raninger
2013	Florian Ebner	Helmut Dallinger	Alois Stöbich
2014	Rudolf Stürmer	Sigurd Diess	Johann Zandt
2015	Hubert Zauner	Dieter Oleinek	Johannes Weninger
2016	Josef Mülleder	Johann Hafner	Markus Mair
2017	Christian Rieseneder	Ingrid Müller	Balthasar Rohrmoser
2018	Anton Wimmer	Peter Baumann	Friedrich Wastl
2019	Manfred Huemer	Rudolf Raninger	Günther Pestitschek
2020 (Note: Final played in August 2021 due to the COVID-19 pandemic.)	Andreas Fellner	Johann Zandt	Josef Breidt
2022	Christian Rieseneder	Johannes Clementi	Franz Oberndorfer
2023	Ernst Hartl	Arno Peter	Franz Padinger
2024	Helmut Tetmann	Franz Oberndorfer	Josef Mülleder

== Prominent players ==
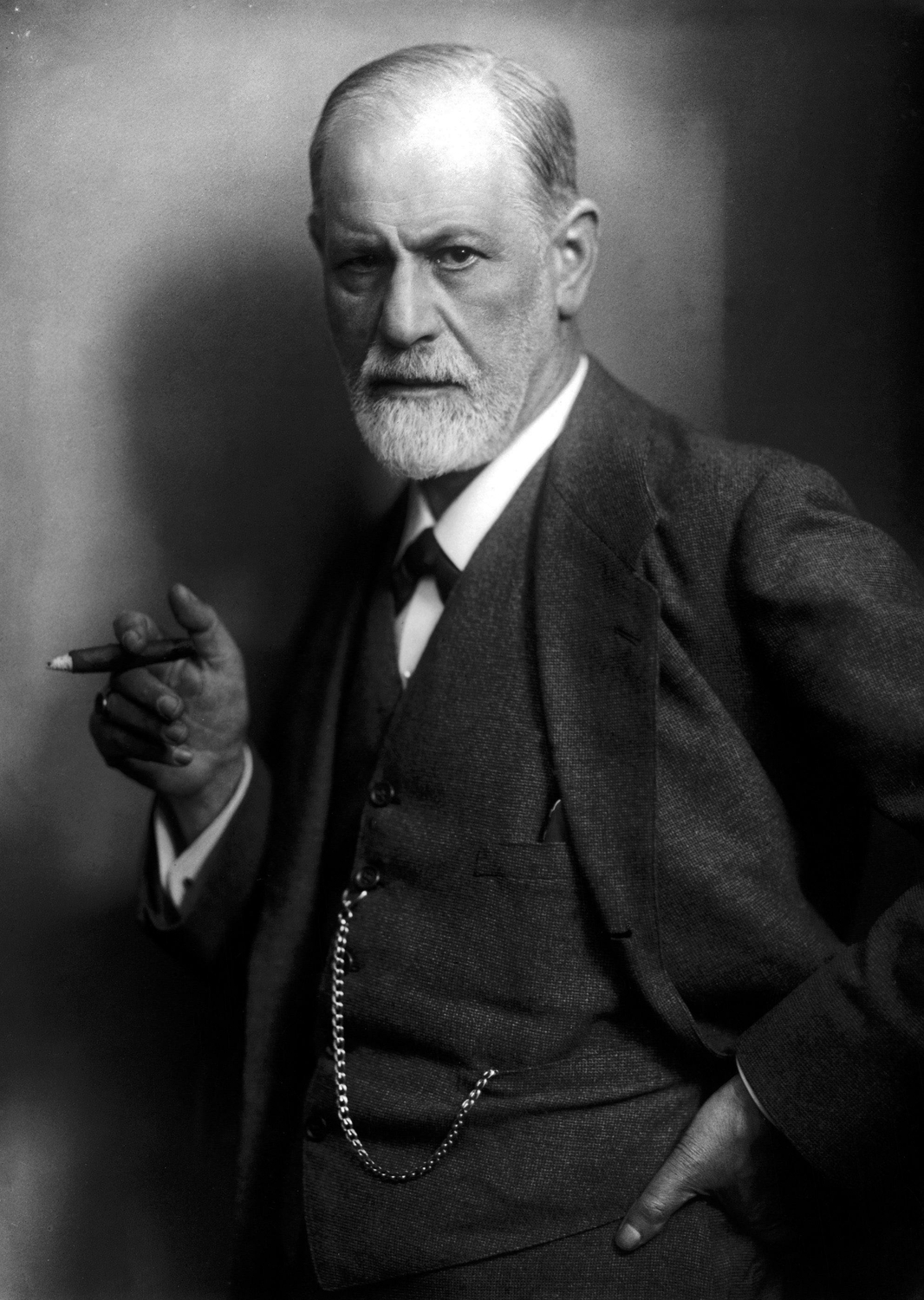
Sigmund Freud indulged in Königrufen in his spare time.

The most famous player in the history of Königrufen was Sigmund Freud. In responding to a friend's criticism of his worn Tarock cards, he jokingly replied "let us have a little pleasure in 'unculture'" – an allusion to his work Civilization and Its Discontents, whose original title was Das Unbehagen in der Kultur.

In Vienna, Königrufen is also popular with politicians, journalists and the advertising industry. For example, the former federal chancellors Julius Raab (ÖVP), Franz Vranitzky (SPÖ), Wolfgang Schüssel (ÖVP) and Alfred Gusenbauer (SPÖ) were, or are, prominent Königrufen players. After his political career, Schüssel even designed his own set of Tarock cards, the proceeds of which were donated to charity. Karl Renner's passion for Tarock has been recorded, but it is not known specifically which variant(s) he played.

Other Königrufen players include the ÖVP's former vice-chancellor, Wilhelm Molterer, head of the Senior Citizens' Association, Andreas Khol, and Minister of Economics, Reinhold Mitterlehner. Among SPÖ politicians, Königrufen players include former Minister of Transport, Rudolf Streicher, and former Federal Whip, Josef Kalina.

The former President of Caritas Austria, Franz Küberl, also plays Königrufen. He hosts a charity tournament every year just before Christmas in Graz. The best-known Königrufen players among journalists are editor-in-chief, Michael Fleischhacker (Die Presse), former editor-in-chief, Andreas Unterberger (Die Presse and Wiener Zeitung), former ORF director, Gerhard Weis, the ORF Head of Television, Heinrich Mis and ORF Editor, Roland Adrowitzer. Prominent women who indulge in the game are cabaret artist Lore Krainer, Vienna ORF regional director, Brigitte Wolf, cultural journalists Gabriele Flossmann and Eva-Maria Klinger, the former president of the Austrian National Bank, Maria Schaumayer, and former vice president of the Austrian Federal Economic Chamber, Ingrid Tichy-Schreder.

== Literary accounts ==
In Friedrich Torberg's 1975 collection of anecdotes, Die Tante Jolesch, about the interwar Austria, the game of Tarock surfaces again and again. A complete paragraph of the book is dedicated to a type of Königrufen:

The master players at Café Central had invented an incredibly complicated version of the already demanding "Königrufen", which they called "Rostopschin". In addition to the "Pagat Ultimo" – the announced obligation to take the last trick with the lowest tarock – there was also an "Eagle Owl Pre-ultimo", namely the announcement that one would take the penultimate trick with the second lowest tarock, which, if successful, earned a high scoring bonus. An even higher bonus was awarded to the player who took two tricks in a row during the game with Tarocks XVII and XVIII. That wasn't to be announced in advance, but only when the first card was played with "Ross!" and the second with "Topschin!"

— Torberg (1975), p. 217

According to Robert Sedlaczek, Torberg, a non-tarocquist, was probably mistaken in thinking that the name of the bonus Rostopschin was used for the whole game.

The game gave its name to the novel Königrufen by Peter Marginter. Although this is not about the game itself, the plot is reminiscent of a Rufer game in which the partnerships are also unknown at the beginning.

In Eva Holzmair's thriller, Rose, Löwe, Rosmarin, Königrufen plays a linking role. In 1945, four adolescents learn the game from a Jewish refugee in the last days of the war. More than 40 years later, they find themselves together again for a game in Vienna's Café Central. After another quarter of a century there is the last meeting where the now eighty-year-olds are informed by a witness about a dramatic event a long time ago.

== Cards ==
Pagats by modern, Central European manufacturers; three type 6, one type 5 (here smaller, in Austria however usually larger than type 6)

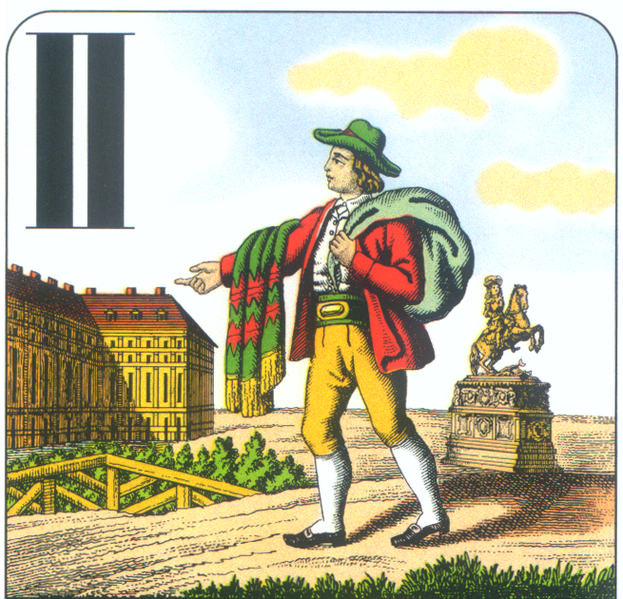
Tarock II showing a Tyrolean cloth dealer in front of the Vienna Hofburg

Königrufen uses the basic Tarock pack with a reduced number of cards – the full Tarock pack contains 78 cards. The 54-card pack is divided into two groups: 22 tarocks and 32 suit cards.

The card design is that of the Industrie und Glück series, which, conceived in 1815 from replacing motives of the Chinese Tarock (Chinesentarock), developed into the standard design for Austrian tarock cards in the 19th century. Some of the motifs are from older tarock series, such as the Pagat and Sküs still from the Chinese Tarock pack, others from the Nationality Tarock (Nationalitätentarock) series, which portray Austrian folk in their traditional costumes, or from an Occupations Tarock (Berufetarock) pack. Today Type Five (from 1860) and Type Six (from 1890) of the Industrie und Glück series are still in use.

=== Tarocks ===
Of the 22 tarocks, numbers I to XXI are sequentially numbered with Roman numerals; only the highest, the Sküs, is unmarked. They assume the role of permanent trumps or atouts: in almost all games (apart from the Suit contracts) they trump the suit cards.

Six tarocks play a special role and are thus given names. Cards I to IIII are commonly called Birds (Vogerl or Vögel):

- I – Pagat or Spatz ("Sparrow")
- II – Uhu ("Eagle Owl")
- III – Kakadu ("Cockatoo"), Pelikan ("Pelican") or Kanari ("Canary")
- IIII – Quapil, Marabu ("Marabou"), Kikeriki ("Cock-a-doodle-do"), Lämmergeier ("Vulture") or Wildsau ("Wild Boar")
- XXI – Mond ("Mond")
- Sküs or Gstieß (the Fool) – the unnumbered highest tarock, similar in appearance to the Joker in other card games.

The Sküs, Mond and Pagat together form the 'Honours' or Trull. These three have a much higher card value than the other tarocks (see Card values). These names were originally derived from the French and Italian: excuse (pronounced "ex-kooz", meaning "excuse [me]"), le monde (the world, corresponding to card XXI in French tarot – wrongly translated into German as der Mond, "the moon") and il bagato (from bagatella, meaning "triviality").

According to the classification devised by Tarock card game expert, Michael Dummett, Königrufen belongs to the Type 3 Tarock games – i.e. those where the Sküs is not a special card, but simply the highest tarock, effectively the Tarock XXII.

=== Suit cards ===
The 32 suit cards consist of eight cards each in the four French suits of Hearts, Diamonds, Spades, and Clubs, all suits being of equal rank.

Four cards in each suit form are the court cards or "figures" (Figuren). In descending order they are the King (König), Queen (Dame), Cavalier (Cavall) and Jack (Bube). The Cavalier, also called the Knight (Reiter), is unusual for Tarock beginners who are only familiar with games using the standard French pack. It is often confused with the Jack or King. The Cavalier (Italian cavallo) is recognizable by being depicted on horseback, and unlike the King, wears neither a crown nor carries a sceptre.

The other half of each suit is made up of the four pip cards (variously known in German as the Skartindeln, Skatindeln, Glatzen or Blätter). The difference in rank between the red and black pip cards reminds us that, in earlier Tarock variants, all the cards from Ace to 10 were used. Even then, the ranking in the red suits was reversed to the black ones. When reducing the hand, the six lowest suit cards were removed: 10, 9, 8, 7, 6 and 5 for Hearts and Diamonds, and Ace, 2, 3, 4, 5 and 6 for Spades and Clubs.

== General rules ==
There are no unified rules for Königrufen; indeed there is an "unbelievable variety of rules" in this variant of the Tarock game. This is seen as an attraction by many, but as a problem by others. Tournaments, of course, do publish strict rules which tend to vary little over time and offer some consistency.

Except where stated, the following description of the rules is based on Mayr and Sedlaczek who, in turn, have drawn from the rules of the Austrian tournament series.

=== Overview ===
Königrufen is a game for four players and play is anti-clockwise. Like all Tarock games, it is a point-trick game where scoring is not primarily based on the number of tricks won, but the number of points within the tricks. Exceptions are the bonus of Valat, where the aim is to take all the tricks, and negative contracts like Bettel and Piccolo, where the aim, respectively, is to take no tricks at all or exactly one trick. There are no 'draws' in Königrufen – if the declarer does not score at least one point more than his opponents, he has lost. However, the basic contract game and the bonuses won and lost by either side may add up to 0 in a specific game. For example, a Rufer may be won by the caller and his partner (awarding them 1 game point), although the Trull is won by the opponents (so they also earn 1 game point), summing up to 0 points for the game in total.

Each player receives a hand of twelve cards in two packets of six; and two packets of three cards are dealt face down in the middle as the talon. After determining which announcement will be played (and by whom), a specific player (depending on the contract) leads a card to the first trick on the table after possibly drawing from the talon. From now on – as in most similar card games – the winner of the last trick always leads to the next one, until either all twelve tricks have been played or the declarer has clearly failed to achieve his goal.

=== Trick rules ===
==== Playing to the trick ====
As in most other Tarock games, two irrevocable rules apply in Königrufen to following to a trick:

- Players must follow suit (Farbzwang or Bedienzwang). If a suit card is played, each subsequent player must play a card of the same suit to the trick, provided he has the same suit. This also applies to tarocks, i.e. if a tarock has been played, the following players must play a tarock to this trick.
- Players must trump with a tarock if they cannot follow suit (Tarockzwang or Trumpfzwang). If a player cannot follow suit because he has no card of the same suit, he must play a tarock card to the trick. If he has no tarocks either, he may play any card to the trick (which cannot win the trick).

There is no requirement to head the trick or overtrump.

An additional rule exists in Negative Contracts. Here, while players must follow suit, they must also head the trick if they can (Stichzwang). Each player must overtake the highest card, if possible, whilst still following suit.

Players are largely free to lead a card of their choice to a trick. However, there are exceptions.

- Cards that have been reserved by announcement for one of the last tricks (Birds, King ultimo) must be played in that trick, if it can be done legally, and cannot be played earlier unless forced to do so.
- In negative contracts, the Pagat may only be led or played as the last tarock in the player's hand.
- In the Suit games, players must lead suit cards first, unless they have only tarock left in their hand.

==== Card ranking ====
A higher-ranked suit card beats a lower card of the same suit; a higher tarock beats a lower tarock. The trick is won by the player who has the highest card in the led suit, if no tarock is played. Otherwise the highest tarock wins.

That said, tarocks do not trump a led suit card in Suit games, albeit they must be played under the trump/tarock rules which still apply.

An often-used special rule is that if all three Trull cards are played to the same trick, the Pagat wins. This special rule is usually called the Emperor's Trick (Kaiserstich) or Fairy Tale Trick (Märchenstich) and may or may not be tied to a certain sequence of Trull cards. There is also no hard and fast rule about whether it also applies in Negative and Suit contracts – in the latter however only if the tarocks have been played out.

=== Players ===
The individual players take different roles:

==== Dealer ====
The dealer's role is to shuffle the cards and deal them counterclockwise to all the players. Beginning with forehand, he deals 6 cards to each player, sets the talon down in the middle of the table and deals another 6 cards to each player.

==== Cutter ====
The cutter is the player to the left of, or opposite, the dealer who cuts the shuffled pack into two packets, which are then reassembled by the dealer in reverse order. This gives the cards an additional shuffle and ensures the dealer does not cheat. The cutter is usually given the option of "knocking" instead of cutting. In this case, the talon is placed down first and then four stacks of twelve cards are counted out next to the talon. The players – starting at the right of the dealer – choose any stack as their hand.

==== Forehand, middlehand and rearhand ====
Forehand (Vorhand) sits to the right of the dealer, middlehand (Mittelhand) to his right and rearhand (Hinterhand) is to the left of the dealer. Forehand starts the auction (Lizitation), usually simply with the announcement "forehand" (Vorhand) or "my game!" (Mein Spiel). He also usually leads to the first trick, except in Negative Contracts (Negativspiele). In addition, forehand has the right to make certain special announcements reserved only for him – the Forehand contracts (Vorhandspiele). In the following game, forehand becomes the dealer.

==== Declarer or soloist ====
The player who announces the highest-value bid during the auction earns the right to play his chosen contract and becomes the declarer or soloist (Spielersteher or Spielersteiger). If a partner game (Rufer = “Caller”) is announced, the declarer calls out a partner. Only then does he select one half of the talon (again depending on the current game) and select his bonuses (Prämien). In a Negative Contract, he leads to the first trick himself, otherwise forehand leads.

==== Partners ====
Who partners with whom, depends on the contract. In Negative Contracts or a Dreier ("Threesome") game, one player plays against all the others. In Trischaken everybody plays everybody else; in Rufer usually two play against two. In the narrower sense, a partner is the partner of the declarer, in a broader sense it can mean all players playing in the current game.

=== Auction ===
The auction (Lizitation) is where players bid for contracts ("games"), and it takes place, like the dealing of cards, in an anti-clockwise direction. Forehand usually starts the bidding by announcing "forehand!" Then the players in turn say whether they want to bid for a contract or pass. The player who bids a contract with the highest game value may play it. If a player does not wish to bid, he just says "pass" or "next!" (weiter!) and therefore bows out of the auction. A typical auction could look like this:

- Player 1: "Forehand!" (Vorhand!)
- Player 2: "Pass!" (Weiter!)
- Player 3: "Solo Rufer!" (Solorufer!)
- Player 4: "Bettler" (Bettler!)
- Player 1: "Pass!" (Weiter!)
- Player 2: may no longer bid as he has already passed.
- Player 3: "Threesome!" (Dreier!)
- Player 4: "Pass!"

As a result, Player 3 secures a Dreier contract, and Player 1 (forehand) leads to the first trick.

=== Talon and laying off ===
The six cards that are dealt face down in two groups of three cards each in the middle of the table are called the talon.

Most game announcements result in the player exposing the talon visibly to all players and selecting one of its two halves for his hand. He picks them up and places three cards face down, which belong to his tricks. This is called 'discarding' (verlegen).

Only suit cards ranking below a King may be laid. Only if a player has fewer than three such cards in his hand, may he lay a tarock – but then it has to be face up. Kings and Trull cards may not be laid off. The remaining half of the talon becomes one of the opponents' tricks.

However, other things can also happen with the talon:

- The talon stays hidden and counts at the end with the opponents' tricks (Solo contracts).
- The player takes all six cards and discards six cards (Sechserdreier).
- The talon plays no part in the game (Negative contracts, including Trischaken).
- In Trischaken, the six cards of the talon are played individually to the first six tricks (Vienna Tarock Cup, Styrian Cup) or go to the player who wins the last trick (Raiffeisen Cup and Hausruck Cup).

=== Calling a king ===
Unlike many other card games, there are no fixed partners in Königrufen. The cards and the bid-for contract decide who plays with whom.

If, during the auction, a Rufer contract is called, which is one of the "positive contracts", has won the auction, the successful declarer announces a King of his choice. The player who has the King of the chosen suit in his hand becomes the player's partner, the other two players play as the opposing team or "defenders". If the player has three Kings, he can call "the fourth" without naming its suit. If the player has all the Kings, some rules allow him to 'call a Queen' (Vienna Cup, Styrian Cup), while others forbid a Rufer to be played in such circumstances (Raiffeisen Cup, Hausruck Cup).

If the called King is in the talon, the player can give up and pay the game to everyone. Alternatively, he can play the game against all three or, depending on the house rules, the defenders can double the stakes by calling Kontra (see below), or the game may be turned into a Dreier. Some house rules prohibit the Kontra in this case in order to reduce the number of abandoned games.

=== Kontra ===
If an opponent does not believe that the declare contract ("game") or bonus will be won, he can say "Kontra!". This doubles the value of the game or bonus. Games and bonuses can be kontra'd independently of one another. If the player thinks he can still win, he can double the value again with a "Rekontra!" (Re, Reh or Retour). Depending on the rules agreed, the opponent can counter with a "Subcontra!" (Sub, Superkontra or Hirsch), which now increases the value eightfold. Some rounds play with even more levels, such as Mordkontra which is worth x 16.

In positive matches, one Kontra always counts for the whole team, but in negative matches everyone can Kontra individually (contra ad personam). In Trischaken, because everyone plays against everyone, there is no Kontra.

== Bonuses ==
In addition to winning a positive game by scoring the majority of points, other goals, the so-called 'bonuses' (Prämien), may also be involved. The most obvious – similar to other card games – is to win all the tricks. In Königrufen this is called Valat. A Valat either multiplies the basic game value or has a constant, high, value, depending on the rules agreed.

The other bonuses are divided into two fundamentally different groups, the first of which, however, is rarely played today:

- Hand Bonuses (Prämien aus der Hand), which the player announces based on cards he holds in his hand;
- Trick Bonuses (Prämien in den Stichen), which represent a goal to be achieved during the course of the game.

Trick bonuses may usually either be 'silent' or 'announced' without prior notice, usually counting double when announced. If they are announced, they can be Kontra'd in any case.

Hand bonuses are statements of fact about the constellations in a player's hand before the game that are only awarded if announced. The gamble is that part of the player's hand will be revealed to the others in exchange for a bonus or as information for the partner. Since the announcement automatically results in a bonus, it cannot be Kontra'd. Adopted from older Tarock variants, they are no longer played in today's tournaments and are therefore only mentioned below among the rarely played variants.

The Trull can be announced as a bonus

Many game rules divide the bonuses in the tricks into two further sub-groups:

- Game Bonuses (Spielprämien) that can be won during the game;
- Material Bonuses (Materialprämien), which have to be achieved in the cards won after the game.

This distinction is useful when the two groups are treated differently in the case of Valat: game bonuses are independent of Valat and are therefore valid without restrictions. Material bonuses are achieved almost automatically with the Valat (the opponents only have 0, 3 or 6 talon cards) and are therefore not valid when 'silent', but only when they had been announced before. However, this distinction is not a generally accepted standard. In the different player communities, different variants occur such as "No bonus counts with Valat", "All bonuses only count when announced", up to the co-multiplication of some bonuses.

=== Game bonuses ===
Name	Description
Birds: Pagat / Owl / Cockatoo / Quapil (Vögel: Pagat / Uhu / Kakadu / Quapil)	Take the last / 2nd last / third last / fourth last trick with the respective Bird
King Ultimo	The called King is played in the last trick and won by the partner.
Capturing the Mond (Mondfang)	The Mond is captured by the Sküs (usually only played still i.e. unannounced).
Capturing the King (Königfang)	The called King is captured by the defenders.

=== Material Bonuses ===
Name	Description
Trull	One side has the Trull (Sküs, Mond and Pagat) among its tricks.
Four Kings	One side has all 4 Kings in its tricks, which usually also means they have a Royal Trull (Königstrull).
Honours (Honneurs)	Of the seven highest cards (Trull cards and Kings), a side has at least five in its tricks.
Absolute and Grammopoi (Grammeln, Sackprämien)	The side that has won the game has at least 45 points and two cards (Absolute) or 55 and 2 cards (Grammopoi). Other names (1st and 2nd Sack; Grammeln and Großgrammeln) as well as other limits are used.

==== Vögel (the birds) ====
The birds are the lowest tarocks:

- I – Pagat (The Fool) Also: Spatz (Sparrow)
- II – Uhu ( Eagle Owl).
- III – Kakadu (Cockatoo). Also: Pelikan (Pelican) or Kanari (Canary).
- IIII – Quapil. Also: Marabu (Marabou Stork) or Wildsau (Boar).

The Pagat is a special "Bird" as it also belongs to the Trull.

The birds count as bonuses, if they win the appropriate trick. The Pagat must be won in the last trick, the Uhu in the penultimate, the Kakadu in the third to the last, and the Marabu in the fourth to the last. In the variant of the rules played in Cheltenham, the Marabu bonus trick is not played.

They must win the trick if they are to count as bonuses. Even if the taker's partner captures a bird Tarock, the bonus is lost and counts as negative. They are also lost if they are announced and not successfully achieved.

==== King Ultimo ====
The King Ultimo bonus is scored, if the called king wins the last trick. The bonus is also scored if the taker's partner takes the called king in the last trick.

==== Mondfang (capture of the XXI) ====
In some variants, Mondfang is scored if the second highest tarock (the Mond or XXI) is taken by the highest (the Sküs).

== Games by groups ==
=== Ordinary positive games ===
Positive games or positive contracts (Positivspiele) is the collective term for those games in which the aim (possibly among others) is to win a majority of points. The positive games are the various types of Rufer and Dreier, including their Solo contracts.

==== Rufer games ====
In a Rufer ("Caller"), a partner is called. The Rufer contracts include:

- Common Rufer with talon – Forehand Contracts
- Solo Rufer – Rufer without talon
- Besser Rufer – Rufer with the announcement of a Bird

==== Dreier ====
A Dreier contract (Dreierspiel) is a positive game in which a soloist plays the other three players. Dreier contracts include:

- Dreier – with talon
- Solo Dreier – without talon
- Suit Dreier and Suit Solo
- Sechserdreier – Forehand Contracts

==== Solo games ====
Solo is a qualifier that indicates that the player is offering to play without inspecting the talon. As an isolated word, it is usually short for Solo Rufer. So Solo does not carry the same meaning as in other card games, including another popular Austrian Tarock variant Zwanzigerrufen – a contract where a soloist offers to play against all the rest. As we have seen, such a contract is called Dreier (or Dreierspiel) in Königrufen. At the end of the game the talon counts among the tricks of the opponents, except if, in a Solo Rufer, the called King is in the talon – then that half of the talon belongs to the declarer. Solo contracts count double the corresponding game with the talon; also all bonuses (usually excepting the Valat) count double in a Solo contract. Solo games are:

- Solo Rufer (Solorufer)
- Solo Dreier (Solodreier)
- Solo Suit Dreier (Solofarbendreier)

=== Suit games ===
Suit games (Farbenspiele) are a special form of positive contract with several special rules:

- The trick-taking power of the tarocks over the suit cards is nullified (they must however be played if the player is not able to follow suit).
- Tarocks may not be played as long as the player still has suit cards.
- In Suit Dreier there are special rules about what may be laid off. Usually tarocks must be laid off, but sometimes tarocks and suit cards may be played at will.

The Solo Suit Dreier is also called Suit Solo (Farbensolo) for short. Occasionally a Suit Rufer (Farbenrufer) is played (possibly only as a Forehand contract), in which a partner is called as with the normal Rufer contract.

=== Negative contracts ===
Negative contracts or negative games (Negativspiele) are games in which the normal aim of winning the majority of points is no longer valid. Instead there is an alternative goal where the player has do the minimum – either to score the fewest points, or to take a specified, low number of tricks. Several special rules apply:

Positive Contract	Negative Contract
Primary aim is to score the majority of points in the tricks (see Scoring).	Aim is to take a specified, low number of tricks (none, one, ...) or to score the fewest points.
Forehand plays to the first trick.	Declarer plays to the first trick.
No Stichzwang	Stichzwang
"Kontra" applies to all players	"Kontra" is applied individually
The Pagat may be played at any time in accordance with the normal rules	The Pagat must only be played as the last Tarock in the hand
Additional goals, the bonuses	No additional goals

There are the following negative contracts:

- Trischaken – Forehand contracts.
- Bettler – the player takes no tricks.
- Piccolo – the player takes exactly one trick.
- Zwiccolo – two tricks.
- Triccolo – three tricks.
- Bettler, Piccolo, Zwiccolo and Triccolo Ouvert (open): here all the players lay their hands open on the table. In tournaments it is allowed for the player's opponents to discuss the strategy; in many private games this is not permitted.

There are also semi-ouvert (half-open) variations where only the player or only the opponents place their hands on the table. In any case, it is not permitted to discuss the strategy in half-open negative games.

In contrast to the positive games, negative games are subject to Stichzwang i.e. the players must win the trick if possible and the declarer of a negative game may play (instead of forehand). All negative games except Trischaken and (half-)open games can be played "with" (Bei- or Mit-), i.e. several (possibly all) players may play a negative game in parallel. This is not permitted in tournaments.

=== Forehand contracts ===
Forehand games (Vorhandspiele) are contracts that only forehand may announce, if all other players have said "pass!" ("Weiter!"). An exception is Sechserdreier mentioned below where it has become generally accepted that forehand must announce it immediately and that it may then be overbid by a higher-value contract.

- Common Rufer (Gewöhnlicher Rufer): forehand calls a partner and takes 3 cards from the talon.
- Trischaken (or Fahren, Abfahrt): each player plays against the rest and tries to take as few points in the tricks as possible. Players must follow suit (Farbzwang) or trump (Tarockzwang) and must take the trick if they are able (Stichzwang). The scoring in Trischaken has almost as great a variation as all the other variants put together. The rules are:
  - The player with the most points loses and must pay all the rest e.g. 10 cents.
  - If forehand loses, he pays double
  - If the loser has scored 36 or more points (35 points and 2 Blatts), he is Bürgermeister or Großbauer and pays double
  - If two or more players lose with the same number of points, they pay the winner(s) 10 cents
  - If a player has no tricks (Jungfrau or Engerl), he gets 30 cents from the loser(s); the rest get nothing
  - If two players have no tricks, they get 30 cents from the loser(s).
  - The Bürgermeister pays a Jungfrau 60 cents or 30 cents to each Jungfrau if there are two.

- Sechserdreier (Sechser): like a normal Dreier, except that forehand reveals and picks up all 6 cards from the talon and discards 6 cards. The loss of this game is usually counted higher than the win (usually double).

== Scoring ==
The values of Königrufen cards. The columns (from l to r) are: Card Type, Number, Card Value

An important feature of Königrufen is the way in which the cards are scored. The total value of the cards is 70 points, but they are divided into 1/3 points. The individual values of the cards are:

- 4 1/3 points: the Trull cards and the Kings
- 3 1/3 points: the Queens
- 2 1/3 points: the Cavaliers
- 1 1/3 points: the Jacks
- 1/3 point: all other cards (= the remaining tarocks and the pip cards)

A card worth 1/3 point is called a Blatt which is why the terms Blatt and Drittelpunkt (1/3 of a point) are used synonymously.

The aim in positive contracts is to score the majority of the 70 points available; strictly speaking to score 35 2/3 points. 35 1/3 points are traditionally rounded down to 35 points and if the scores are 35:35 the declarer has lost – there is no provision for a drawn game. Occasionally local rules allow 35 1/3 points to be a winning score; especially in the Styria.

Since it is cumbersome to add up the values including the third points individually, the value of each card for counting is rounded up or down instead. The rounded-up values correspond to those of other Tarock games, such as Zwanzigerrufen and Hungarian Tarock. The rounded ones were the original ones; a point was added to them for each trick in the old Dreiertarock card game.

=== Rounded-up card values ===
- 5 points: the Trull cards and the Kings
- 4 points: the Queens
- 3 points: the Cavaliers
- 2 points: the Jacks
- 1 point: all other cards (= the remaining tarocks and the pip cards)

To simplify the calculation of scores the cards are grouped in threes, their rounded-up values above are totalled and 2 points deducted. So a King, Jack and pip card are thus worth (5 + 2 + 1) – 2 = 6 points. If a single card is left over, 2/3 points are deducted from its rounded-up value; if two cards are left, 1 1/3 points are deducted. If one wishes to keep score during the game one has to subtract as one goes along: for example, the Pagat, a King, a Cavalier and a Jack are worth (5 + 5 + 3) − 2 + 2 − 2/3 = 12 1/3.

=== Rounded-down card values ===
- 4 points: the Trull cards and the Kings
- 3 points: the Queens
- 2 points: the Cavaliers
- 1 point: the Jacks
- 0 points: all other cards (= the remaining tarocks and the pip cards)

Now take the value of three cards and add 1. As in the example above, a King, Jack and pip card are worth (4 + 1 + 0) + 1 = 6 points. If you want to count during the game, you add the 4 cards in the tricks together and add 1 1/3. So for example the Pagat, a King, a Cavalier and a Jack are worth (4 + 4 + 2 + 2 + 1) + 1 1/3 = 12 1/3.

== Breaches of the rules ==
If a player breaches one of the rules (a Renonce), he not only loses the game in play and any winnings, he must pay all other players (including his partner) as if they had won the game and the announced bonuses.

Examples of rule violations:

- The player has played a card or cards wrongly (e.g. forgot to play a card, played an incorrect number of cards or played a cards or cards that are not allowed).
- The player has not followed suit when able to.
- The player who does not have the led suit has not played a tarock.
- In negative games, Stichzwang was not adhered to.

== Game scoring ==
Local rules vary very markedly from one another. The common guidelines are that announced bonuses count twice as much as silent or unannounced games, and Solo games count twice as much as their basic games. The Solo Dreier is always the highest game.

=== Scoring in the Austrian Final ===
As an example, the rules of the Hausruckviertl Tarock Cup are given here, which are also used for the Austrian Final.

A Sechserdreier must be announced by the forehand, i.e. before the other players bid. In Trischaken, the player who wins the last trick receives the talon.

Payments are based on game points multiplied by an amount of money (usually 10 cents per point).

Forehand Contract	Value
Rufer	1
Trischaken	see below
Sechserdreier	4, if lost 8

Auction Game	Value
Piccolo	2
Bettler	2
Solorufer	2
Besserrufer	1 + Bird
Dreier	4
Farbensolo	5
Piccolo ouvert	6
Bettel ouvert	7
Solodreier	8

Bonuses	Unannounced (still)	Announced (angesagt)
Trull	1	2
4 Kings	1	2
King ultimo	1	2
Pagat ultimo	1	2
Eagle Owl (Uhu)	2	4
Cockatoo (Kakadu)	3	6
Quapil	4	8
Valat	Game ×4	×8

== Less common variants ==
=== Contracts ===
- Bei-Spiele: two or more negative contracts are played simultaneously, e. g. a Piccolo and a Piccolo Bei for another player
- Farbensechser: forehand Suit Dreier with all six talon cards
- Half-Open Negative Contracts: only the auction winners or only the defenders turn their cards up.
- Higher Negative Contracts:
  - Triccolo – three tricks
  - Quadruccolo – four tricks (very rare) in the Salzkammergut (Austria) also called Wildsau ("Wild Boar")
- Variations of Trischaken:
  - Kontra with various meanings
  - Trischaken "from above" (von oben), i. e. the player leading to the trick must play his highest card
  - Trischaken with different trick-taking power, roughly meaning the tarocks are inverted
  - Trischaken without Stichzwang (compulsion to win the trick)
  - Announcement of Jungfrau
- Supra: Rufer, in which the declarer has to score an Absolute, i.e. 45/2.
- Besserdreier: Dreier with Bird as an auction contract
- Oberer, Unterer: Like a Dreier, but the player must choose 'blind' whether to pick up the upper (Obere) or lower (Untere) half of the talon. The chosen half is not shown to the opponents, the remaining half is revealed at the end of the game and its points count towards the defenders total. This variant is well known in three-player Tarock (Tarock zu dritt or Tapp Tarock).

=== Bonuses ===
- Hand Bonuses

Name	Description
Heads (Köpfe)	A player who has two Trull cards in his hand, announces "Heads" (Köpfe).
Hand Honours (Hand-Honneurs)	This announcement means five of the 7 top cards (Trull cards, Kings) are in the player's hand. In other rules only four are needed for this announcement.
Tarock	This means the player has at least 8 tarocks in his hand.
Grand Tarock	A player who only has tarocks in his hand may announce a "Grand Tarock".
No Trull	A Dreier player, who has no Trull cards in his hand, may say this, which results in the trulls not being counted as a bonus for the defenders (usually this also raises the game value).

- Rostopschin: an old bonus – to take two successive tricks with XVII and XVI.
- Also V and VI are played as Birds.

=== Three- and two-player variants ===
Königrufen can be adapted for two or three players by the introduction of dummies (Strohmandeln).

The rules for three players are the same as those for four, with the following changes.

- The missing fourth player is replaced by a dummy that is dealt twelve cards face down like everyone else. The dummy sits to the left of the dealer and therefore moves around for each hand (flying dummy). The dummy can neither be the dealer nor the forehand, and cannot bid for a game. After the auction, the dummy's hand is revealed and remains face up for the rest of the game.
- The player who controls the dummy is known as the guardian.
  - In a Rufer contract where the called king is held by the dummy, the guardian is the declarer.
  - In a Trischaken contract, the guardian for a given trick is the player on lead.
  - In all other cases, the guardian is the opponent whose turn comes first in the first trick of the hand.
- Only the guardian may play from the dummy's hand. Jointly with their own bonus announcements, the guardian may additionally announce bonuses on the dummy's behalf. No additional Kontra is allowed for the dummy in negative contracts.
- In a Trischaken contract, the two players with the most points pay the two players with the least (since the dummy will often be the loser).
- The dummy scores like any other player. At the end of play, its profits or losses are divided evenly amongst the other players. Any remainders will go to the top scoring player if the dummy's score positive, or to the lowest scoring player if the dummy's scorer is negative.

For the two-player variant, an additional dummy is introduced. In Rufer and Trischaken contracts, each player controls a dummy. In a Rufer contract, should one of the human players call the other, a new hand is dealt.

The game proceeds as follows:

1. Auction.
2. Calling a king, where applicable.
3. Exchange with the talon.
4. The dummy (or dummies) are revealed.
5. Announcements.

=== Other variants ===
- Zusammenhaun ("Throw together"): if a player has neither a tarock nor a King, he can/must throw his cards in and they are re-dealt. This rule also has variations, for example if someone has a trull card but no other tarocks the hands may also be thrown in.
- Piccolo with Sküs is banned, or must be specially announced.
- Besserrufer with a table King can be turned into a Dreier.
- A six-player variant exists where two kings are called.

== Königrufen in other countries ==
Königrufen was not limited to the territory of present-day Austria, but spread to large parts of the Habsburg Empire. Several variants have survived to this day. They share with Austrian Königrufen the same pack of cards, distribution of hands and "calling" of a King, but differ primarily in the range of contracts and in the rules for how the talon is treated. Only the most important differences are described here. All these variants have in common that no higher "Birds" have been introduced – only the Pagat ultimo is played.

A King is also called in the otherwise very different game of French tarot for five players, but this does not count as Königrufen, even in the broader sense.

=== Slovenia ===
Slovenian Tarock is played in three- and a four-player variants. The former is basically similar to Tapp Tarock, the latter to Königrufen. However, while in Austria today these are clearly two different games (and overlaps among players are rare), in Slovenia both variants are seen as part of the same game. McLeod classifies it as "less baroque and much more competitive" than Königrufen.

In contrast to Austrian Königrufen, one or two cards may be picked up from the talon during the auction. There is no Solo Rufer with a hidden talon – after Rufer with a card from the talon, the next higher contract is the game alone against the others with three talon cards. The term Solo stands here for games played as a soloist against the others, thus corresponds to the Dreier in Königrufen. The Bettler has a very high game value (70 points), between that of Solo One (60) and Solo Without (80); Open Bettler has an even higher game value of 90 points.

Slovenian Tarock keeps the excess points as in Tappen, something rarely seen in modern Königrufen.

=== Romania and Ukraine ===
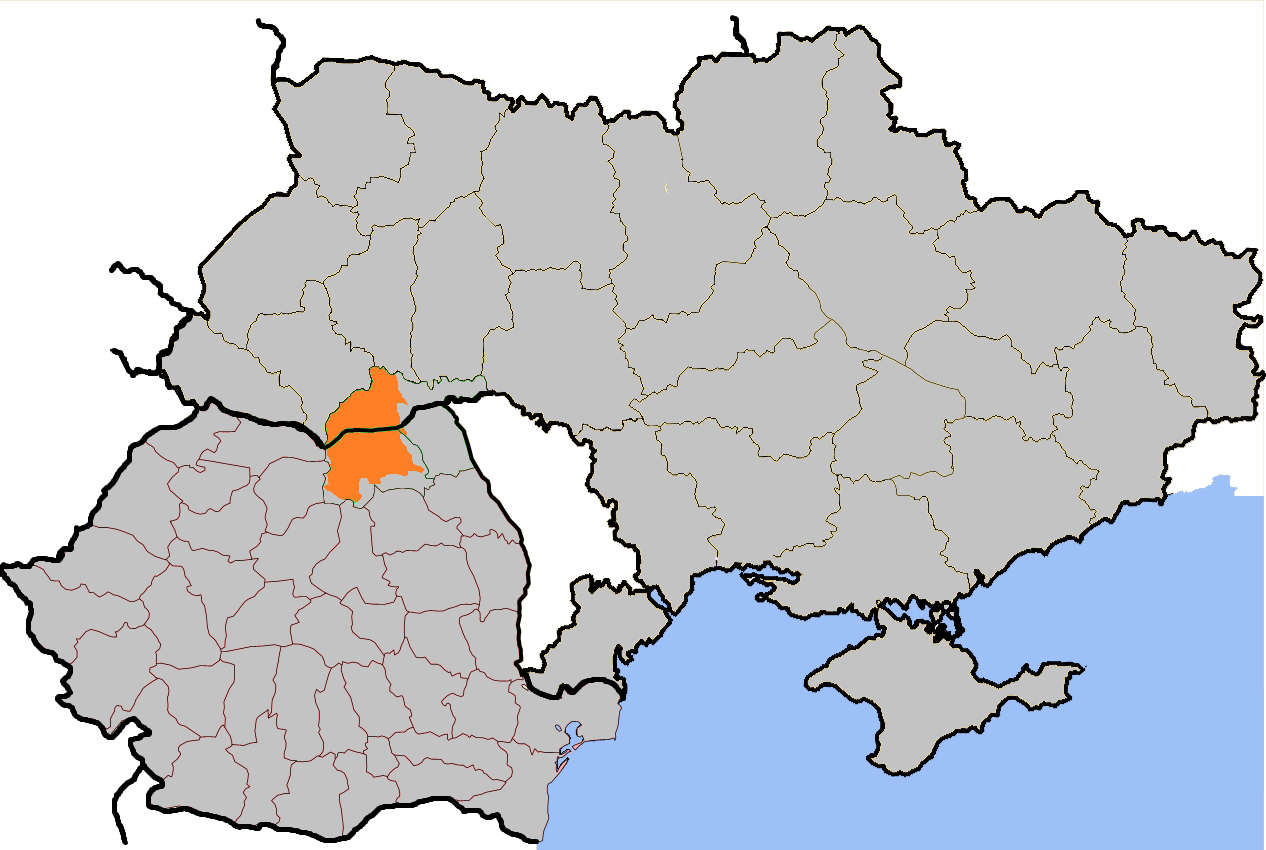
Bukovina (orange)

Romanian Tarock is played in the Bukovina, once the easternmost part of Cisleithania, today divided between Romania and Ukraine. The rules in the two countries differ only slightly.

The players after the forehand are only allowed to bid for Dreier contracts, i.e. those in which one player plays against the other three. In contrast to Austria and Slovenia, the option of picking up all three cards from the talon has been scrapped; the player may only take two, one or none at all. It kept the rule from Tapp Tarock of revealing the talon in stages.

If none of the players announces such a game, however, forehand "must" call a King. If he wants to play alone, he can call a King in from his hand. Players may declare a high number of Tarocks in their hand (eight, nine, or at least ten).

Romanian Tarock also has a three-player version, which is only played with 42 cards.

=== Poland ===
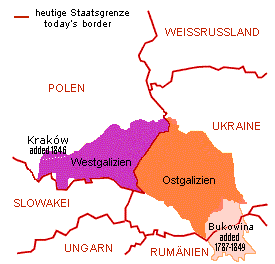
Galicia with today's limits

In Poland south of the Vistula – former Austrian Galicia – Tarock is played, the most popular game being Neunzehnerrufen, which as Taroky is also the national Tarock variant of Czech Republic and Slovakia. However, regionally, especially in Kozy, Poland's largest village, a type of Königrufen has survived, although the large differences in rules make a direct connection between the two games seem unlikely despite their geographical proximity. A distinction between Königrufen and Neunzehnerrufen is not usually made in Polish – they just play Taroki. If clarification is needed they speak of Taroki z królami ("Tarock with Kings") or Taroki z dziewiętnaską ("Tarock with Nineteen").

Polish Königrufen involves four possible bids: Jeden (one talon card), Dwa (two), Trzy (three) or Cztery (four). The highest bidder becomes the declarer. Declarer then calls a King and then announcements of King Ultimo and Kontra are made. Following talon exchange, further announcements may be made for Trul, Pagat ultymo and for holding various card combinations, e.g. 0–2 and 10–12 tarocks in the hand or Four Kings. To win the 35 1/3 points are enough.

=== United States ===
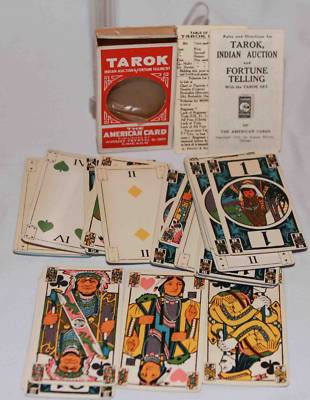
Petrtyl's deck with Indian and American motifs

Since Tarock never reached the British Isles and Iberian Peninsula in Europe, America has also been largely unaffected by the game. It was only later immigrants who brought the game to the USA. In Texas, for example, Czech immigrants introduced Neunzehnerrufen, which is quite closely related to Königrufen, as well as a version of Zwanzigerrufen with a 54-card pack. Apparently some players there had the idea to call a King instead of a high tarock. In the small town of Taylor in Williamson County, this Königrufen variant is also played in tournaments.

As far as the other rules are concerned, however, this game remained closer to Neunzehnerrufen. Thus, in Dreier it retained the uncovering of the talon as per Tapp Tarock: the player first opens one half of the talon and decides whether to accept it; if he opens the other half instead, the game counts twice for him in case of loss. In the Rufer contracts, however, the talon is not opened, but the player picks up the top four cards face down, while the two remaining cards are dealt counterclockwise to two players. The Hand bonuses, which have largely disappeared in Königrufen, have also been retained here – players can announce card combinations that they hold in their hand, such as at least 10 tarocks or four kings.

In 1922, the illustrator, August Petrtyl, who had immigrated from Bohemia to Chicago, attempted to establish a variant of Königrufen in the USA whose cards and names were based on American themes (pictured right). The Sküs was called Uncle Sam, the Pagat, Papoose, and the Kings, Chiefs. A five-player version of this game was also described, in which each player was dealt ten cards and four formed the talon. However, there is no evidence that it was played.

== See also ==
- Tarot card games

== Literature ==
=== Early sources ===
- _ (1827). "Tarok-Tappen mit Königrufen" in Theoretisch-praktische Anweisung zur gründlichen Erlernung des beliebten Tarok-Tappen-Spiels, sowohl durch genaue Bestimmung aller Regeln und Feinheiten, als auch durch die Beobachtung und Auseinandersetzung mehrerer angeführter, sehr schwieriger Beyspiele. Vienna: Carl Haas. pp. 155–207. Earliest known rules.
- _ (1829). "Tappen mit König oder Tarokrufen" in Neuestes Allgemeines Spielbuch. C. Haas, Vienna. pp. 89–94.

=== Books about Königrufen ===
- Vácha, Martin. Handbuch Tarock. Die Kunst des Königrufens. Kral Verlag, Berndorf, 2015, ISBN 978-3-99024-323-7.
- Vácha, Martin. Tarock – Lehrbuch des Königrufens. Ein Weg zum strategischen Denken. Edition Volkshochschule, Vienna, 2007, ISBN 978-3-900799-74-8.
- Flendrovsky, Friedrich. Tarock. Ein Wegweiser durch das königliche Spiel. Self-publication, 2nd improved and expanded edition, 1997, ISBN 3-85028-221-X.
- Hackl, Siegfried. Das Tarock-Spiel. Tarock für jedermann. Sailers Taschenreihe No. 34, Vienna, 1950.

=== Königrufen in books on Tarock ===
- Bamberger, Johannes. Tarock: Die schönsten Varianten. 22nd edition. Vienna: Perlen-Reihe (2011). ISBN 978-3-99006-000-1
- Beck, Fritz. Tarock Komplett: Alle Spiele. 12th edition. Perlen-Reihe Vol 640. Vienna: Perlen-Reihe (1983).
- Dummett, Michael. The Game of Tarot. From Ferrara to Salt Lake City. Duckworth, London, 1980, ISBN 0-7156-1014-7, pp. 502–525.
- Dummett, Michael. Twelve Tarot Games. London: Duckworth (1980), pp. 147–172. ISBN 0 7156 1488 6.
- Dummett, Michael and John McLeod. A History of Games Played with the Tarot Pack. The Game of Triumphs. 2 volumes. Mellen Press, Lewiston, NY, 2004, pp. 575–692. ISBN 0-7734-6447-6 and Supplement (pdf; 3.81 MB), pp. S 32 – S 43.
- Mayr, Wolfgang and Robert Sedlaczek. Das Große Tarockbuch. Verlag Perlen-Reihe, Vienna etc., 2001, ISBN 3-85223-462-X (Perlen-Reihe 642), pp. 26–32, 119–152 etc.
- Mayr, Wolfgang; Sedlaczek, Robert (2016). Die Strategie des Tarockspiels. Königrufen, Zwanzigerrufen, Neunzehnerrufen, Dreiertarock, Strohmanntarock (5th expanded ed.). Vienna: Atelier. ISBN 978-3-902498-22-9.
- Ulmann, S. (1900) Illustrirtes Wiener Tarokbuch. 2nd revised and improved edn. Hartleben, Vienna, Pest, Leipzig.

=== Königrufen in books on card games ===
- Kastner, Hugo and Gerald Kador Folkvord, Die große Humboldt-enzyklopädie der Kartenspiele. Humboldt (2005). ISBN 3-89994-058-X.
- Parlett, David. A History of Card Games. Oxford: OUP (1991). ISBN 0-19-282905-X.
- Parlett, David. Dictionary of Card Games. Oxford: OUP (1996) ISBN 0-19-869173-4
- Parlett, David. The Penguin Book of Card Games. London: Penguin (2008) pp. 353, 367–368. ISBN 978-0-141-03787-5
