= Neunzehnerrufen =

Austrian card game of the Tarock (tarot) family

- A trick-taking game of the Austrian Tarock family.
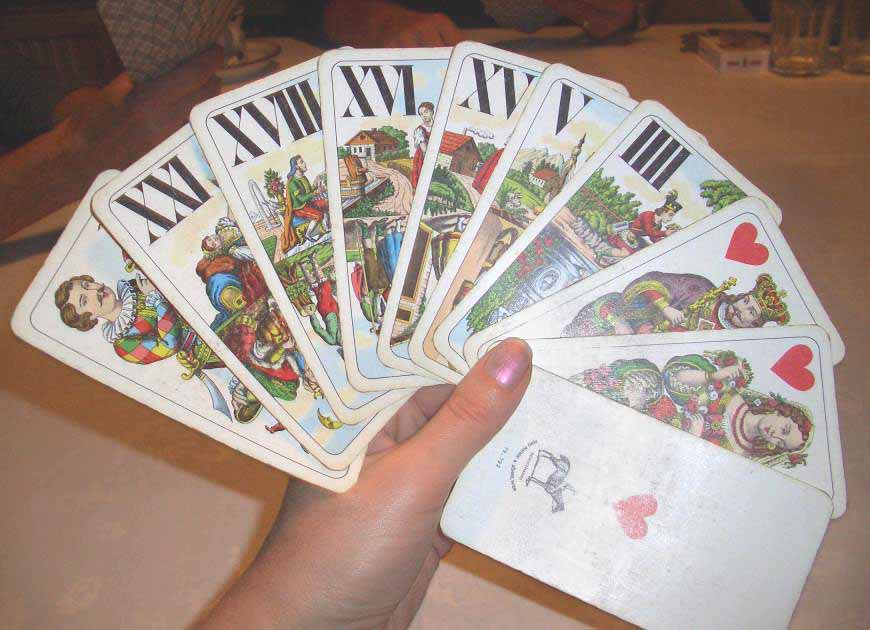
- A hand of Tarock cards
- Origin: Austria
- Type: Trick-taking
- Players: 4
- Cards: 54
- Deck: Industrie und Glück
- Rank (high→low): Tarocks: Sküs, XXI-I ♠♣: K Q C J 10 - 7 ♥♦: K Q C J 1 - 4
- Play: Anticlockwise

Related games
- Königrufen • Tapp Tarock • Zwanzigerrufen

Neunzehnerrufen (German: "Call the Nineteen") is an Austrian card game of the Tarock (tarot) family for four players. Under the name Taroky or Czech Taroky it is the national Tarock variant of the Czech Republic and Slovakia, but - with certain variations – is also played in parts of the Austrian states of Upper Austria, Lower Austria and the Styria as well as in Poland south of the River Vistula.

Despite its name, the game is less related to Zwanzigerrufen than to Königrufen. However, it differs from the latter in the number and way the packets are dealt: 12 cards to each of the four players, 2 × 3 cards go, as a talon into the middle of the table. Thus there has been and is a cross-fertilization process between the two variants, with the exchange of game and bonus declarations.

== Major differences from Königrufen ==
- As the name suggests, a playing partner during a contract of Rufer (Ruferspiel) may not specify a King, but the Tarock XIX.
- In contracts in which the aim is to win the majority of card points, there are stages: the more card points in the tricks, the more game points are scored by the winning side.
- Bonuses from the hand that reveal information about one's own hand and are hardly ever played in Königrufen are mandatory calls in Neunzehnerrufen. The player gets points for doing so, but to forget is seen as revoking.

== Bonuses ==
There are 4 types of bonuses in Neunzehnerrufen. The first, Valat, is achieved when one team wins every single trick. The second, Pagat on the end, is achieved when the Pagat is played on the last trick and no other Taroky are played. The third, Contra (Flek or Kontra), is called before the game begins and doubles the outcome of the game. Finally, the point cards are called just before Contra and are based on the cards each player has in hand after discarding.

=== Valat ===
There are two types of valat: called and uncalled.

In a valat game, every single trick was won by one team. The winning team receives 20 chips from the opposing team. If a player was playing Prever, instead the winning team receives 30 chips.

Called valat is very similar, but the payout doubles. If the team which called valat misses a trick, the game immediately ends and they pay as if the opposing team called and won valat. This means that valat is called very rarely, if ever. Payouts are 40 chips or 60 chips for prever.

=== Pagat on the End ===
If the Pagat (Taroky I) is played on the last trick, then Pagat on the End is paid. Typically, this is 2 chips, but it varies widely, even to as much as 10 chips.

If the Pagat wins the trick, then the team who played Pagat wins the bonus. If another taroky is played, even by the partner of the player who played Pagat, then the opposing team wins the bonus.

Players also have the choice to call Pagat on the End before play begins. If they do so, the bonus doubles (anywhere from 4 up to 20 chips, or 1 to 5 Kč). Only the player who has the Pagat may call it. If the Pagat is played before the last trick, then that teams loses Pagat on the End and must pay the bonus.

=== Contra ===
After point cards are called, any player who is not on Povinnost's team (or not on prever's team, in a game with prever) may call contra (flek or kontra).

Effectively, contra doubles the payouts at the end of the round.

Contra is typically signaled by a knock on the table, known as "knocking"

If contra is called, the opposing team (either Povinnost's team or prever) may call rhea-contra (or re-contra, reflek) to again double the payout.

Finally, if rhea-contra is called, the first team to call contra may call supra-contra to again double the payout. If supra-contra is called, the payout will be 8 times the original count.

=== Point Cards ===
Neunzehnerrufen contains several bonuses dependent on the cards each player has after discarding:

Name	Requirement	Pay
Uni	No trump	4
Bida	1 or 2 trump	2
Tarocky	8 or 9 trump	2
Taroky	10 or more trump	4
Trul	Skyz, Mond, and Pagat	2
Pane	4 or more 5-point cards	2
Rosanne Pane	All 4 kings	4
Rosanne Pane Plus	All 4 kings and one of the Trul	6

These bonuses differ significantly from other Taroky variations, such as Königrufen. Additionally, all bonuses must be called, with the exception of Povinnost calling Uni and Bida.

==== Payments ====
After each player declares their bonuses (sometimes referred to as point cards or money cards), each player receives chips or Kč from each other player equal to the total of all point cards they had. For example, if one player has Trul Taročky, they would receive 4 chips from each other player, for a total of 12 chips.

== Literature ==
- Dummett, Michael (1980). The game of Tarot : from Ferrara to Salt Lake City. London: Duckworth. ISBN 0-7156-1014-7. OCLC 7275570.
- Mayr, Wolfgang; Sedlaczek, Robert (2001). Das große Tarock-Buch (in German). Wien: Deuticke. ISBN 3-85223-462-X. OCLC 634795812.
- Dummett, Michael; McLeod, John (2009). A History of Games Played With the Tarot Card Pack: The Game of Triumphs: Supplement. Oxford: Maproom Publications. ISBN 978-0-9562370-0-2.
