= Dreier =

Dreier is German for "three-er" and may refer to:

- Dreier (coin), an historical German coin
- Dreier (Königrufen), a contract in the Tarot game of Königrufen
- Dreier (surname), people with the surname
- Dreier (Tapp Tarock), a contract in the Tarot game of Tapp Tarock

== See also ==
- Dreierles
- Dreyer
