= Hungarian Tarokk =

Hungarian Tarot card game

- A "fine game"
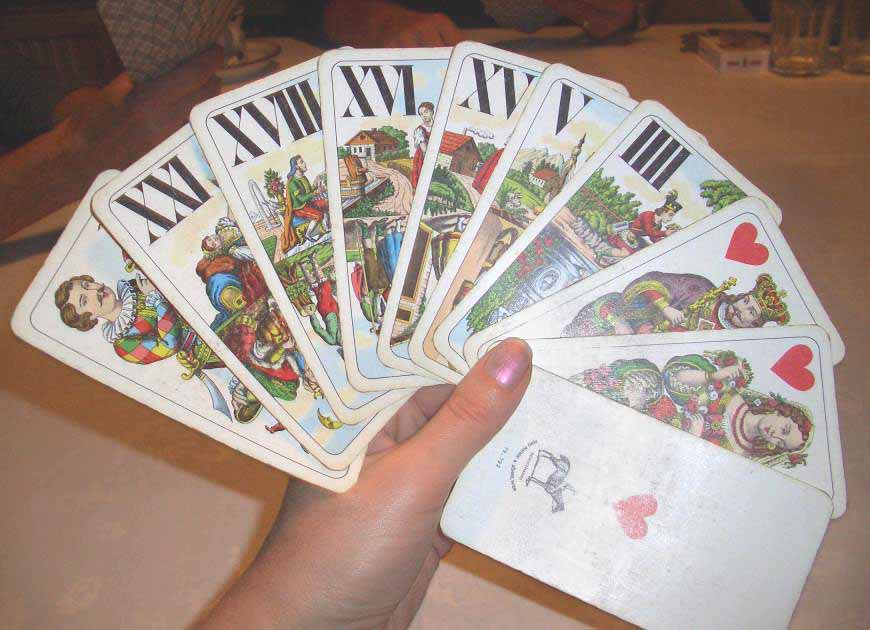
- Origin: Hungary
- Alternative names: Húszashívásos Tarokk, or Paskievics Tarokk
- Type: Trick-taking
- Players: 4
- Skills: Tactics, Strategy
- Cards: 42
- Deck: Industrie und Glück
- Rank (high→low): Trumps: Skiz, XXI-I ♣♠ K Q C J 10 ♥♦ K Q C J 1
- Play: Anticlockwise
- Playing time: 20 min.

Related games
- Zwanzigerrufen

The Tarock card game family is represented in Hungary by a variant for four players that uses a 42-card deck, variously called Hungarian Tarock (Hungarian: Húszashívásos tarokk), Hungarian Tarokk or Paskievics (German: Paskiewitsch in Austrian sources). According to McLeod "interest in this fine game may again be increasing."

== Names and history ==
According to research by card game experts, Hungarian Tarock originated in the 19th century from a variant of the Austrian game, Zwanzigerrufen ("Call Twenty"). This is plausible, because its native name, Húszashívásos tarokk, means "Call Twenty Tarock", and also because there are major similarities between the two games, albeit they differ greatly in the way they are played. The other common name for the game is Paskievics (in old Austrian sources Paskiewitsch), named after Ivan Fyodorovich Paskevich who, as the Russian commander-in-chief in 1848 contributed significantly to the suppression of the Hungarian Revolution. This may be why 48 points are needed to win the game (depending on the sub-variant).

In the 1920s, Károly Lingel and Lajos Polyák developed a refined version with several additional contracts which, according to tarock players, greatly increase the fun of the game. This variation was widely played in Hungary as Illustrated [Hungarian] Tarock (Illusztrált tarokk) or Palatine Tarock (Palatinusz tarokk).

In the late 20th century, Dr. Endre Kovács, the most famous expert on the game, developed another variant, High Tarock (Magas tarokk), with 10 additional contracts. However, it did not take off. Royal Tarock, developed by Zoltán Gerots with 70 bonuses and contracts, deviates quite strongly from Hungarian Tarock, because two cards are removed and also card values are omitted. This variant, like Austrian Zwanzigerrufen, is played with 10 cards in the hand and no talon, but with all 22 tarocks. Only four cards of the two red suits remain. The cards no longer have a point value; instead the tricks won are awarded bonuses. Royal Tarock is usually played with pre-determined partnerships. However, the partners sit next to each other, not opposite one other as in Bridge and Ottocento.

Around the turn of the millennium, the game was imported to Austria where it enjoys increasing popularity at least in Vienna. This is essentially the Illustrated Hungarian Tarock with some contracts from High Tarock. To avoid confusion with an Austrian three-player variant, also called Illustrated Tarock, Austrian Tarock experts gave the game the name Illustrated Zwanzigerrufen (Illustriertes Zwanzigerrufen).
