= De Troyer =

De Troyer is a surname. Notable people with the surname include:

- Kristin De Troyer (born 1963), Belgian professor and theological researcher
- Tim De Troyer (born 1990), Belgian racing cyclist

== See also ==
- Troyer
