= Dreyer =

Dreyer is a common German surname originating from Grübe in Holstein Germany. Notable people with the surname include:

- Benjamin Dreyer (b. 1958), American writer and copy editor
- Benedikt Dreyer (1495–1555), German sculptor, carver and painter
- Carl Theodor Dreyer (1889–1968), Danish director
- Dave Dreyer (1894–1967), American composer & pianist
- Dekker Dreyer (b. 1980), American director and producer
- Edward L. Dreyer (1940–2007), American historian of Ming China
- Frederic Charles Dreyer (1878–1956), officer of the Royal Navy
- Gordon Dreyer (1914–2003), English footballer
- Harry Dreyer (1892–1953), English footballer
- Henry Dreyer (1911–1986), American athlete
- Jake Dreyer (b. 1992), American guitarist for the band Witherfall and Iced Earth
- Jim Dreyer (b. 1963), marathon swimmer
- John Louis Emil Dreyer (1852–1926), Danish-British astronomer
- Malu Dreyer (b. 1961), German politician (SPD)
- Olaf Dreyer, German theoretical physicist
- Nikolay von Dreyer (1888–1919), Imperial Russian navigator
- Pam Dreyer (b. 1981), American ice hockey player
- Peter Dreyer (b. 1939), South African writer and politician
- Rosalie Dreyer (1895–1987), Swiss-born naturalized British nurse and administrator

== See also ==
- Dreyer's, an ice cream brand
- Dreyer objects, a former way of referring to NGC objects
- Dreier (disambiguation)
- Lieutenant Dreyer, Soviet icebreaker, former CGS Minto
