= Dryer (band) =

American rock 'n' roll band

Background information
- Origin: Saratoga Springs, New York, USA
- Genres: Rock, Lo-fi, Indie, Punk
- Years active: 1992–2002, 2010-present
- Labels: Paint Chip, Tramp, Gig, The Orchard, Fake Chapter
- Members: Bob Carlton; Joel Lilley; Rachael Sunday; Brian Akey
- Past members: Mike Kuba (drums 1992); Ross Calloway (drums 1992-1993)

Dryer is an American rock 'n' roll band from Saratoga Springs, New York. Dryer formed in 1992, and the three members of the band: Bob Carlton (guitar, vocals), Joel Lilley (drums, vocals), and Rachael Sunday (bass, vocals) were active from 1993 until 2002. They reunited in 2010 and played shows in and around the Northeast until taking time off in 2012. In 2014, the band returned as a four-piece with the addition of Brian Akey (formerly of The Winterpills) on guitar.

== History ==
In 1992, Bob Carlton and Rachael Sunday formed the band after meeting through a mutual friend while Rachael was attending Skidmore College. The original lineup was Bob Carlton (guitar/vox), Rachael Sunday (bass/vox) and Mike Kuba (drums). Ross Callaway replaced Mike on drums but was then replaced by Joel Lilley in 1993.

Shortly after Joel joined the band, they recorded their first 7-inch letterbox on Paint Chip Records. That 7-inch led to a record deal with Paint Chip Records for their first full-length CD titled Saturday in Vain.

Dryer toured the US multiple times in the 1990s, playing memorable shows on bills with the likes of Y&T, Frank Black, Superchunk, fellow Saratoga Springs band The Figgs, Tugboat Annie and Boston-based band The Gentlemen among many others. They played quite a few festivals including the Millennium Music Festival, ESPN Winter X-Games, and CMJ throughout their career. At one point Dryer garnered attention from music heavyweights Atlantic Records, and had gone as far as recording demos for the record label.

In 2001 Dryer signed to Gig Records, released one recording, were voted best Indie-Rock band by Metroland and then in 2002 the band broke up. Dryer's song "MTV" appears on the soundtrack for the 2008 documentary film America the Beautiful.

In 2009, Fake Chapter Records released a 31-song compilation titled Strut and Fret, that spanned the entire career of the band. The band agreed to a reunion show in their hometown to promote the new compilation, which was on April 16, 2010, at the Putnam Den in Saratoga Springs, NY. They planned for this to be their only show but due to the overwhelming success of the show and rekindled friendship, the band decided to continue playing.

In 2014 Dryer expanded to a four-piece band with the addition of Brian Akey (formerly of The Winterpills), as the band's second guitar player.

== Discography ==
- Letterbox, 7-inch vinyl, (Paint Chip Records), 1994
- Half-Assed compilation, 7-inch vinyl, (Kranepool Records/Shithouse Rat), 1994
- Fear Into Fuel, (Paint Chip Records), 1994
- Beauty Parade, cassette, (Self-released), 1995
- Saturday In Vain, CD, (Paint Chip Records), 1996
- Dryer / Beef, split 7-inch vinyl, (Tramp Records), 1996
- i wish i had a positronic brain, 7-inch vinyl, (Tramp Records), 1996
- Out of the Loop, CD, (Paint Chip Records/Tramp Records), 1998
- The Duplex Planet Presents - Ernie: Songs of Ernest Noyes Brookings, CD, (Gadfly Records), 1998
- Fake Chapter Eleven Records Presents...., CD, (Fake Chapter Records), 1999
- Magnet Magazine compilation, CD, 2000
- Everything In Static, CD, (Gig Records), April 2001
- Fake Chapter Records Holiday Compilation, CD, (Fake Chapter Records), 2002
- Fake Chapter Downloading Is Fake V.1, CD, (Fake Chapter Records), 2004
- America The Beautiful soundtrack, 2008
- Strut and Fret 1993 - 2002, digital download, (Fake Chapter Records), 2010
- Bright Moon Bright Sun, 2016
- Prodgnerd, Digital single, (Bandcamp) 2020

== Music videos ==
- Desperate Annies
- The Ceiling, 2010.
- Don't Steal Or Kill This Christmas, 2010.
