= Dryer (surname) =

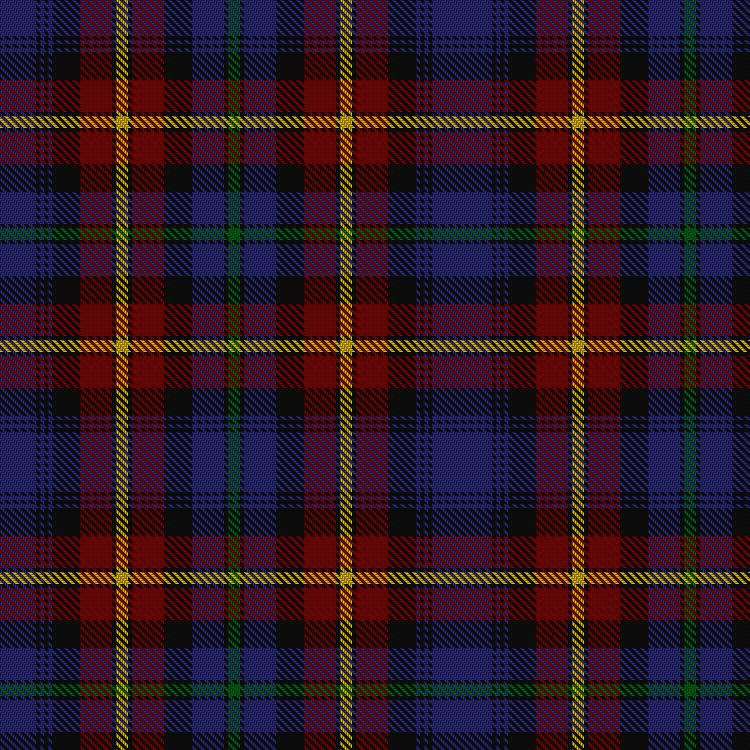
Dryer Family Tartan

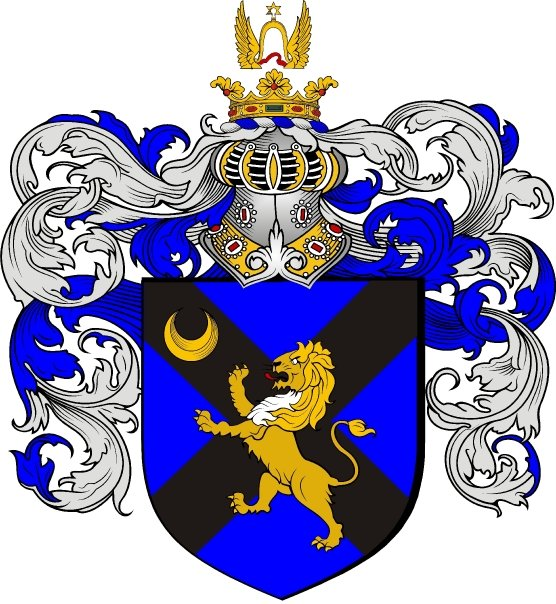
Dryer Coat of Arms

Dryer is a surname. Notable people with the surname include:

- Fred Dryer, American pro football player and actor
- Ivan Dryer, Designer of laser light shows
- Moosie Drier, American actor
- Sally Dryer, American voice actress from the 1960s
- Thomas J. Dryer, 19th-century American newspaper publisher
- Matthew S. Dryer, 20th-century American professor of linguistics
