= Gottlieb Treyer =

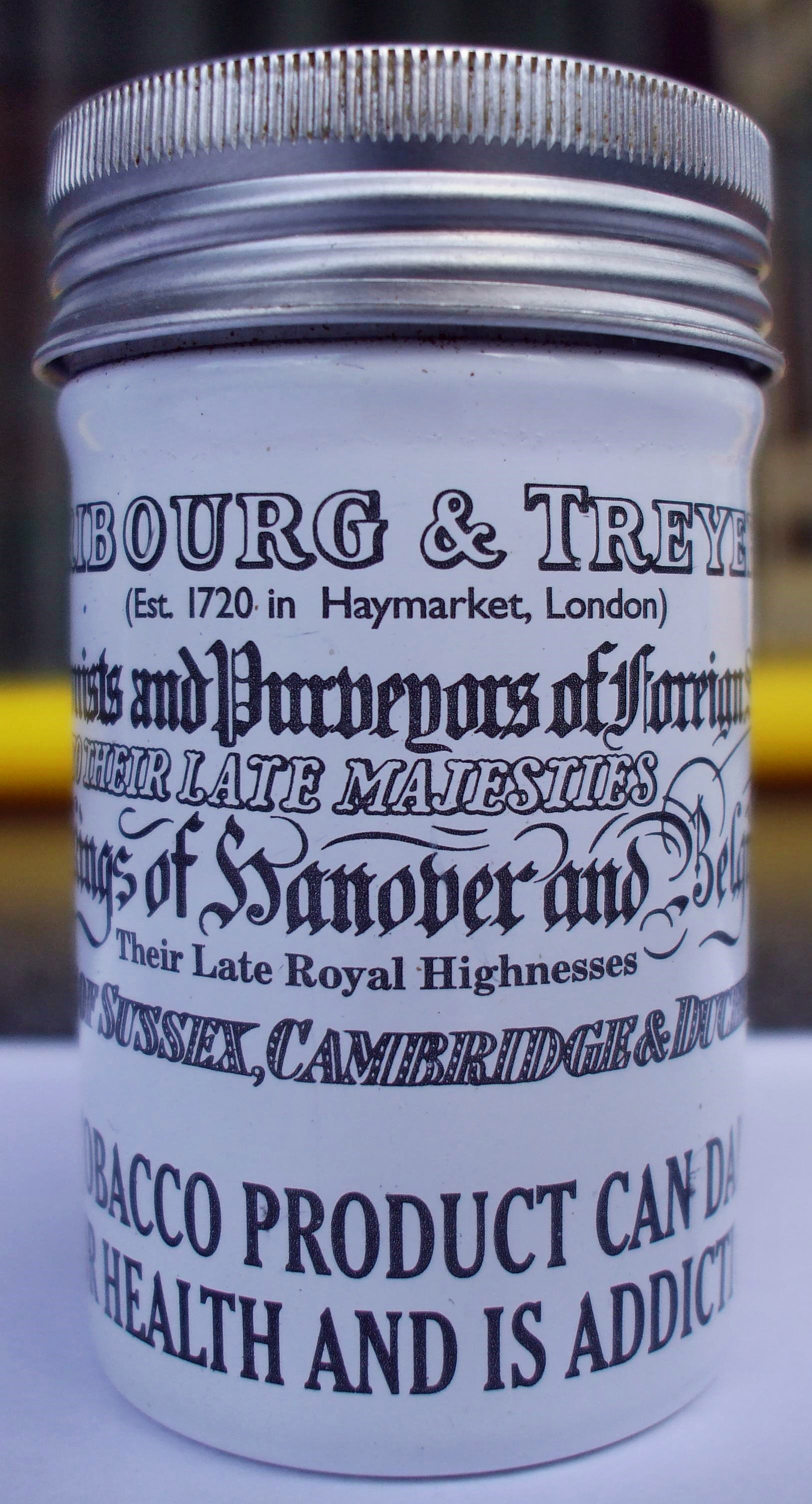
Fribourg & Treyer snuff

Gottlieb Augustus Treyer (1790–1869) was a Holy Roman Empire-born British snuff manufacturer and retailer.

He married Mrs Martha Evans who had entered into the business established by Mr Fribourg in 1720, at the sign of the Rasp and Crown. The business became Fribourg & Treyer, and they sold cigars and snuff and cigarettes from at least as early as 1852, from their premises at 34 Haymarket, London.

Customers included King George IV, and Beau Brummell.

He is buried at Kensal Green Cemetery.
