= Zwanzigerrufen =

Austrian trick-taking card game

- A trick-taking game of the European Tarot card game family.
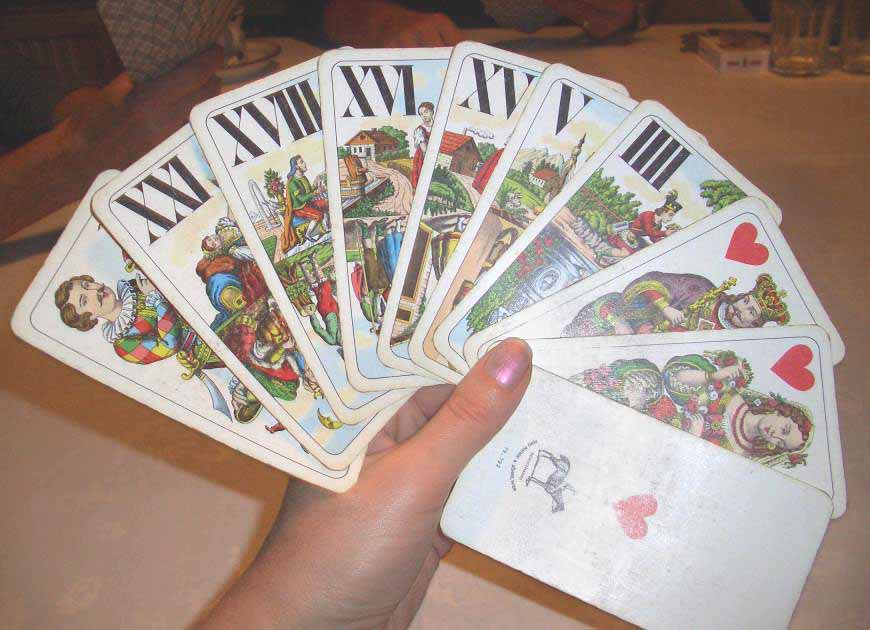
- A hand in Zwanzigerrufen
- Origin: Austria
- Type: Trick-taking
- Players: 4
- Cards: 40
- Deck: Industrie und Glück
- Rank (high→low): Tarocks: Sküs, XXI-IIII + I ♠♣: K Q C J 10 ♥♦: K Q C J A
- Play: Anticlockwise

Related games
- Königrufen • Tapp Tarock • Neunzehnerrufen • Dreiertarock

Zwanzigerrufen or Zwanz'gerrufen is the leading trick-taking card game of the Tarock family in many regions of eastern Austria. Its rules are simpler than the game of Königrufen which is more widely played in the whole of Austria. As is common in Tarock games, the cards have various point values – the primary goal in an individual game is to win the majority of points.

== Cards ==
Zwanzigerrufen is played with 40 cards taken from the 54-card deck used for Königrufen (the so-called Industrie und Glück deck). The resulting deck consists of 20 tarocks as trumps and 20 plain suit cards.

The tarocks are numbered with Roman numerals from I to XXI, in addition there is the unnumbered Sküs or Gstieß. Tarocks II and III are removed in Zwanzigerrufen. The tarocks each count as 1 point; only the Trull cards - I (Pagat), XXI (Mond) and Sküs - each count as 5.

In the suit cards are the King (5 points), Queen (4), Knight (3), Jack (2) and a so-called Baldy (Glatze) as a set in each suit. The Glatzen usually comprise the 10 of Spades, 10 of Clubs, the Ace of Hearts and the Ace of Diamonds; these score 0 points. Other cards may be used as Glatzen - the 4 of Hearts and 4 of Diamonds have the advantage of being easier to recognise.

In scoring at the end of the game the values of the cards won (in tricks) are simply added. There is no splitting of the points into thirds or deducting/adding of points per trick as in Königrufen. The total value of all the cards is 88. To win the game, a team or player must score more than half the total, to wit: 45 points.

== Playing ==
The dealer shuffles the cards and the player to his left cuts the deck. Then each player is dealt 10 cards in two packets of five, starting with forehand to the right of the dealer. There is no talon. Instead of cutting, the cutter may 'knock' - in this case the dealer places 4 stacks of 10 cards each on the table. Players can then choose one stack at a time, starting with forehand.

When all the players have picked up their cards, forehand begins the auction. For a normal game (see below) she calls for "den Zwanziger" (in Vienna also called der Oide), the Tarock XX, whereupon the player holding the XX in his hand becomes her partner. If forehand herself has the XX, she can call for the XIX (vulgo Gartenzaun = "Garden fence"), if she also has this, the XVIII and so on up to the XVI. If forehand has all the tarocks from the XX to the XVI in her hand, she cannot announce a normal game, but must play a solo. The called player does not have to declare his possession of the called card, but may reveal himself as a partner by various game declarations.

Forehand must at least call for a Tarock held by another player who then becomes her partner. If she doesn't want to make any more bids, she says "next" or "pass" (Weiter), and the other players may bid in turn. Further declarations may be made in turn until all players in a hand have just said "next".

Forehand always leads. Players must follow suit (Farbzwang) and, failing that, play a trump (Trumpfzwang or Tarockzwang), but do not have to head the trick even if they could (i.e. there is no Stichzwang). When a suit card is played, all players must follow this suit. If a player does not have a matching suit card (any more), he must play a tarock. If he does not have a tarock either, he can discard any other suit card. Tarocks can be played at any time, except in Suit Solo, when a tarock may only be played if a player no longer has any suit cards in his hand. A tarock must be followed by a tarock, as long one is still held - if no tarock is held, it must be followed with a suit card.

The tarocks are permanent trumps and always trump the suit cards, except in Suit Solo. A higher numbered tarock beats a lower one. As in Königrufen, there is also the rule that when the Sküs, Mond (XXI) and Pagat (I) meet, the Pagat wins the trick (the so-called Fairy Tale Trick or Märchenstich).

=== Zusammenwerfen ===
In some tarock circles there are rules allowing the game to be stopped immediately after dealing by returning all the cards to the table, known as Zusammenwerfen. The game does not count and the same dealer deals a new hand: if you don't have a single tarock in your hand, you must do this; if the only tarock card you have is one of the trulls you may end the hand this way. It is advisable to discuss the validity of these rules with one's playing partners.

== Auction ==
In Zwanzigerrufen, the following contracts may be played and are worth the game points shown:

- Normal game (1 point)
- Suit Solo (Faberln, 4 points)
- Solo (Schwarzer, 4 points - sometimes 5 points)

Solo overrides Suit Solo in the auction, which means that if one player announces a Suit Solo and another player announces a Solo, the latter is played.

In addition, there are a number of bonuses that can either be declared or played or won without advance notice:

- Absolute (1 point; 2 if declared)
- Pagat Ultimo (1 point; or 2 if declared)
- Valat (6 points; 6x game value or 12x game value on declaration)

All bonuses can be declared by all players, whereby dazu ("in addition") or dagegen ("against") must be declared, i.e. whether the game is played with or against the forehand. When a "Pagat Ultimo dagegen" is declared, a Kontra must also be announced for the game (with "Absolute dagegen" or "Valat dagegen", one will automatically also always announce Kontra).

Announced bonuses count double. If an announced bonus is not reached, it counts for the opponent. Silently played and lost bonuses are not counted for obvious reasons; any game in which one team loses but scores more than 32 points would otherwise be counted as 0 points due to the lost silent Absolute. The exception is the Pagat Ultimo. If the Pagat is played and beaten in the last trick, this is counted as a lost silent Pagat Ultimo.

Finally there are the card bonuses of the Trull (1 point if a player has Sküs, Mond and Pagat in his hand) and "4 Kings" (2 points), as well as the game bonus "Mond captured" (Mondfang, 1 point) if the Mond has been tricked by the Sküs (even if the partner has won it, it counts against the team that lost the Mond). The Fairy Tale Trick is not considered a Mondfang.

The card bonuses are won by holding the cards in one's opening hand, not by holding them in the tricks at the end of the game. They do not have to be declared because they give information about your hand to your opponent, but they should be claimed after the game when scoring. After the Mond is captured, a "double round" is played, the next four games are scored double.

=== Contracts and bonuses ===
In a Normal Game, forehand plays with his partner against the other two players, the 'defenders'. Forehand leads to the first trick, after which the player who won the previous trick leads. The team that scores at least 45 points wins.

In Suit Solo, one player (the caller) plays against the other three and must also score at least 45 points. The tarocks do not count as trumps in this game, but beat each other in the usual way. The caller must have at least 5 suit cards to be able to call a Suit Solo. The player who leads must play a suit card if he still has one in his hand. All players are must follow suit (Farbzwang). The only bonuses used in Suit Solo are Valat, Absolute and "4 Kings". Pagat Ultimo, Trull and Mondfang are not counted. The Fairy Tale Trick, on the other hand, applies when a tarock is played.

In Solo, the caller plays against the other three and must score 45 points, with tarocks being the trump card, as in normal play. In Solo, all bonuses are doubled when working out the score.

Absolute means that one team has not scored more than 32 points. This can either be declared or simply occur during the course of the game. However, if the other team is not "absolute", the calling team loses.

In Pagat Ultimo the caller commits himself to take the last trick with the Pagat. The Pagat Ultimo is only considered to be won if the Pagat is played in the last trick and itself takes the trick - if the partner beats the Pagat the game is lost. Likewise, the Pagat Ultimo is lost if the Pagat has to be played before the last trick, regardless of whether it is beaten or wins the trick. A Pagat Ultimo is not permitted in Suit Solo and does not count if not declared.

Valat means that one team takes all the tricks. According to some rules and regulations, Valat cancels everything else, i.e. no other bonus will be awarded.

Kontra and all raises (Retour/Rekontra, Supre, Resupre) may be bid regardless of the game and on all declared bonuses. It is therefore possible, for example, to say Kontra in a Normal Game in response to a declared Pagat Ultimo in order to double the stakes against that bonus, but not to double the stakes for the game itself.

== Scoring ==
All contracts and bonuses are calculated separately. For example, a game might proceed as follows:

1. Forehand: XIX continue! (XIX weiter!)
2. Player 2: Kontra Absolute!
3. Player 3: Kontra on Absolute!
4. Player 4: Pagat against! (Pagat dagegen!)
5. Forehand: Kontra on Pagat!

All players then say "continue" (weiter) and the game starts.

Player 4 has signed up for the Pagat Ultimo, which counts as a double bonus. Players 2 and 4 must also prevent the forehand and player 3 from scoring more than 32 points.

The game ends with the forehand and player 3 scoring 40 points, and player 4 takes the last trick with the Pagat.

The lost game now counts twice because of Kontra (2 points), the lost Absolute also twice because of Kontra on Absolute (4 points) and the declared, countered and won Pagat 4 points. Forehand and Player 3 win 4 points because of the failed Absolute declaration by Player 2, but lose the game with 2 points and the Pagat with 4 points. The game ends with a net score of 2 points for Players 2 and 4.

Since each player settles for himself, both winners are credited 2 points each and 2 points are deducted from both losers. In a Solo game, the soloist plays alone against the three defenders; he receives the value of the game from or pays to all three.

Every declaration by a player is also valid for his partner(s). If one player plays a Solo and one of the others says Kontra, the game also counts double for the other two defenders.

== Significant differences from Königrufen ==
- Zwanzigerrufen is played with 14 fewer cards and no talon. This makes the game faster and the odds on a bid are easier to estimate.
- Forehand cannot declare any special forehand contracts in Zwanzigerrufen, except for the Normal Game (in Königrufen there are also Trischaken and Sechserdreier contracts).
- There are no negative games in classic Zwanzigerrufen (in Königrufen there are Bettel and Piccolo and their 'ouvert' variants). In some game variants, however, for example, the Trischaken is an option in Zwanzigerrufen.
- Only the Pagat Ultimo can be used as a Besserrufer (in Königrufen, II, III and IIII may be used to take the second, third and fourth last trick).
- Simplified counting of trick values.
