= Benjamin Dreyer =

American author and copy editor

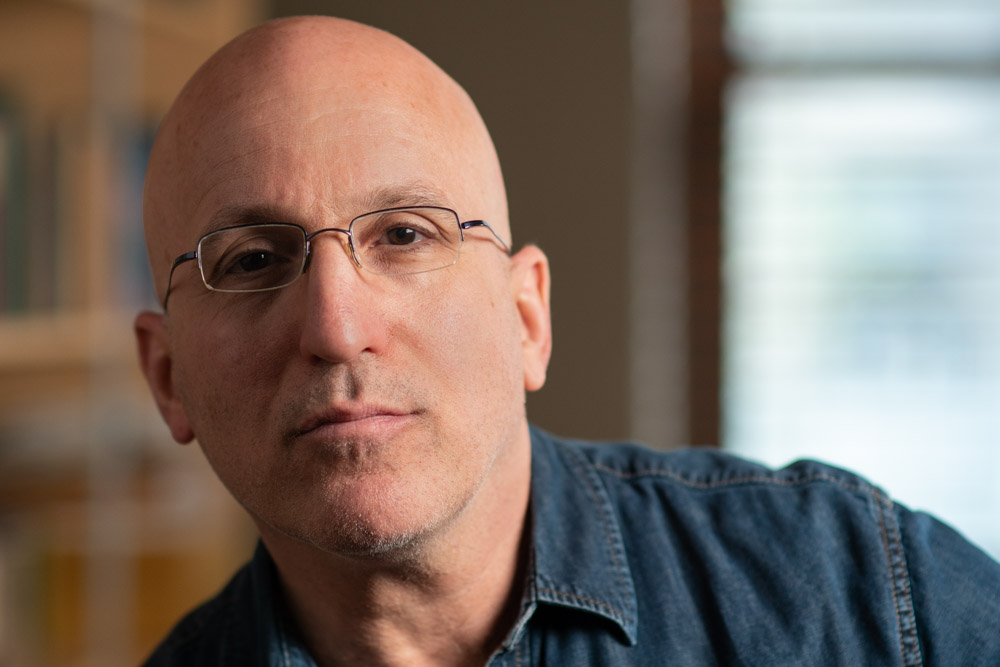
- Dreyer in September 2018
- Born: May 11, 1958 (age 68)
- Education: Northwestern University
- Occupations: Writer, copy editor
- Employer: Random House
- Known for: Dreyer's English
- Title: Vice-president, executive managing editor and copy chief
- Parents: Stanley B. Dreyer (father); Diana C. Seligman (mother)
- Website: benjamindreyer.com

Benjamin Dreyer (born May 11, 1958) is an American writer and copy editor. He was copy chief at Random House until he retired in 2023. He is the author of Dreyer’s English: An Utterly Correct Guide to Clarity and Style (2019). The Washington Post called Dreyer "the unofficial language guru on Twitter".

== Early life ==
Dreyer was born May 11, 1958 in a Jewish family. He grew up in Queens, New York and Albertson, Long Island. He attended Northwestern University.

== Career ==
Early in his career, Dreyer pursued writing and acting. He worked in bars and restaurants before turning to freelance proofreading, and then copy editing. In 1993, he joined Random House full time as a production editor. He was promoted from group manager to senior managing editor and copy chief in 2008 and served as vice-president, executive managing editor and copy chief, at the Random House division of Penguin Random House. until 2023. Supervising the publication of hundreds of titles a year—The New York Times describes Dreyer's role as "style-arbiter-of-last-resort"—he works with novelist Elizabeth Strout as the sole author he continues to copy-edit himself.

=== Dreyer's English ===
Dreyer's English began as a revision of an internal memo to advise copy editors and proofreaders at Random House. The memo expanded to about 20 pages, and eventually Dreyer became interested in developing it into a book. That book, Dreyer's English: An Utterly Correct Guide to Clarity and Style, was published by Random House in January 2019. It debuted at #9 on The New York Times bestseller list for "Advice, How-To & Miscellaneous" and received enthusiastic reviews.

In The New Yorker, Katy Waldman wrote that "Dreyer beckons readers by showing that his rules make prose pleasurable... The author’s delight in his tool kit is palpable." Writing in Paste magazine, Frannie Jackson recommended the book as "invaluable to everyone who wants to shore up their writing skills and an utter treat for anyone who simply revels in language." The Wall Street Journal's reviewer, Ben Yagoda, saw "wisdom and good sense on nearly every page", and noted what he termed a trend of "copy editors' memoirs-cum-style guides", comparing Dreyer's English to "the splendid Between You & Me: Confessions of a Comma Queen", from New Yorker copy editor Mary Norris.

The Washington Post calls Dreyer "the unofficial language guru on Twitter".

In 2020, Dreyer released STET! Dreyer's English: A Game for Language Lovers, Grammar Geeks, and Bibliophiles, a card game based on his style guide. Dreyer maintains an active presence on social media, where he frequently comments on grammar, usage, and literary culture.

== Personal life ==
Dreyer lives in Santa Monica, California.

== See also ==
- Strunk & White
