= Gordon Dreyer =

English footballer

Personal information
- Full name: Gordon Dreyer
- Date of birth: 1 June 1914
- Place of birth: Whitburn, England
- Date of death: 6 February 2003 (aged 88)
- Place of death: Luton, England
- Height: 5 ft 11 in (1.80 m)
- Position: Wing half

Youth career
- St Mary's Juniors

Senior career*
Years	Team	Apps	(Gls)
–1931	Whitburn St Mary's		
1931–1934	Washington Colliery		
1934–1935	Hartlepools United	15	(0)
1935	Hull City	5	(0)
1936–1937	Hartlepools United	26	(0)
1937–1943	Luton Town	23	(0)
–1946	Cheltenham Town		
1946–1947	Bedford Town		
1947–1949	Gravesend & Northfleet		
1949–1950	Rushden Town		
- * Club domestic league appearances and goals

Gordon Dreyer (1 June 1914 – 6 February 2003) was an English professional footballer who played in the Football League for Hartlepools United, Luton Town and Hull City as a wing half.

== Career statistics ==
Appearances and goals by club, season and competition
Club	Season	League			FA Cup		Other		Total	
Club	Season	Division	Apps	Goals	Apps	Goals	Apps	Goals	Apps	Goals
Hartlepools United	1934–35	Third Division North	15	0	―		2 (Note: Appearances in Third Division North Cup)	0	17	0
Hull City	1935–36	Second Division	5	0	0	0	―		5	0
Hartlepools United	1936–37	Third Division North	26	0	4	0	1	0	31	0
Hartlepools United	Total		41	0	4	0	3	0	48	0
Luton Town	1937–38	Second Division	1	0	0	0	―		1	0
Luton Town	1938–39	Second Division	22	0	0	0	―		22	0
Luton Town	Total		23	0	0	0	―		23	0
Career total			69	0	4	0	3	0	75	0
