= Jim Dreyer =

American swimmer

Personal information
- Nickname: The Shark
- Born: August 16, 1963 (age 63) Grand Rapids, Michigan, USA
- Website: www.jimthesharkdreyer.com

Sport
- Sport: Swimming
- Strokes: Open water swimming

Jim Dreyer (born August 16, 1963), self described as The Shark, is an ultra marathon swimmer.

== Career ==
Dreyer completed a 41-hour swim across Lake Michigan in 1998. He failed to repeat the swim in 2023. He failed to complete the route once again the next year due to a his GPS running low on power.

He towed a 906 kg worth of bricks for 35 kilometers from Canada to Detroit in 2013. The swim, which took place in Lake St. Clair, took 54 hours to complete.
