= Alsós =

Alsós is a Hungarian card game of the Jass family with bidding elements borrowed from central European Tarot games. Also known as Vannak and as Kaláber, the game is a variation of Klaberjass.
