= Harry Dreyer =

English footballer

Personal information
- Full name: Henry Dreyer
- Date of birth: 4 March 1892
- Place of birth: Sunderland, England
- Date of death: 1953 (aged 60–61)
- Position: Wing half

Senior career*
Years	Team	Apps	(Gls)
1919–1921	South Shields	58	(2)
1921–1923	Crystal Palace	55	(2)
1923–1924	Southend United	22	(0)
1924	Boston Town		
1925	Seaham Harbour		
Total		135	(4)
- * Club domestic league appearances and goals

Henry Dreyer (4 March 1892 – 1953) was an English footballer who played in the Football League for Crystal Palace, Southend United and South Shields.
