= Fribourg & Treyer =

Coordinates: 51.5099°N 0.1328°W

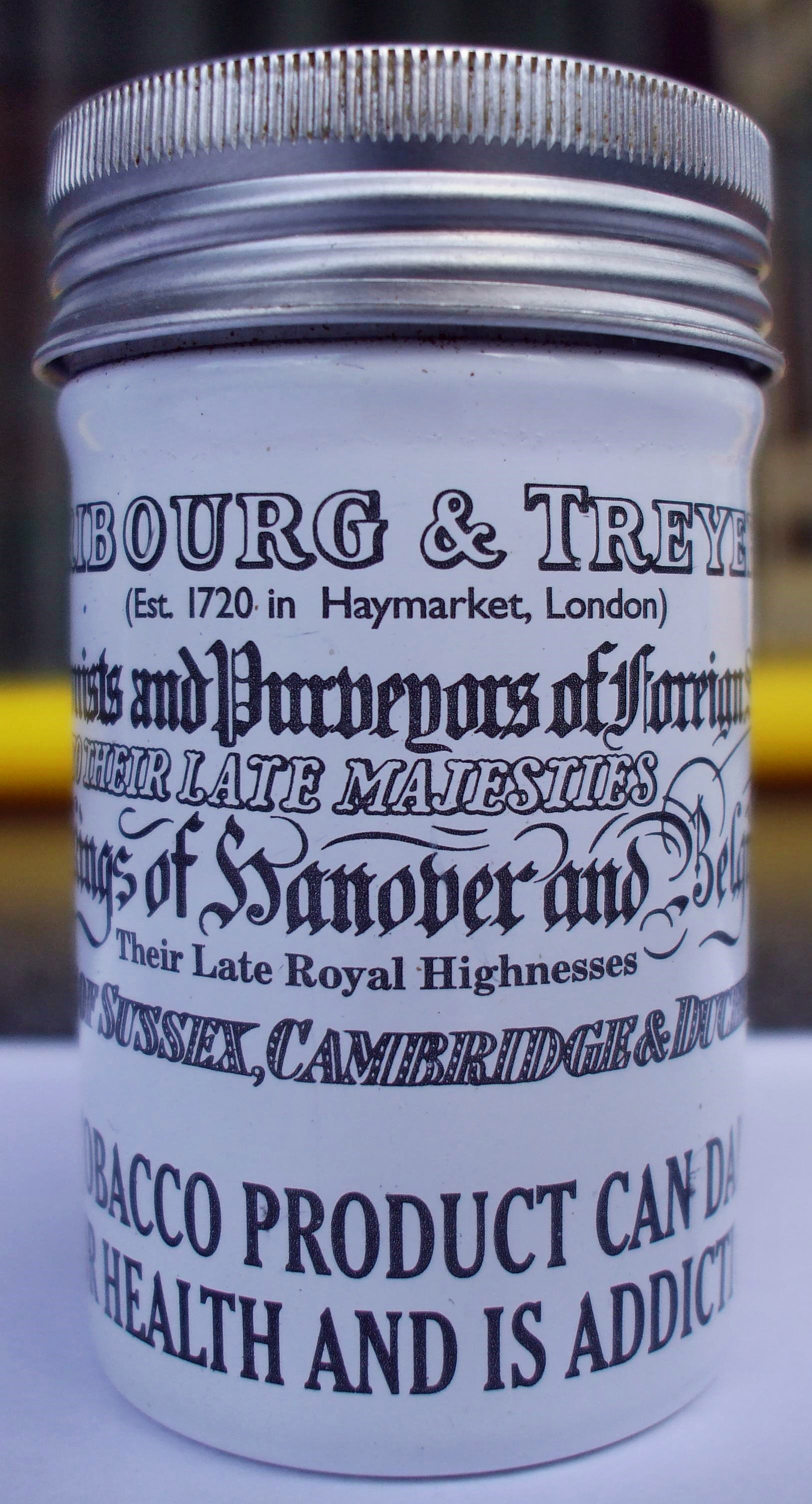
Fribourg & Treyer snuff

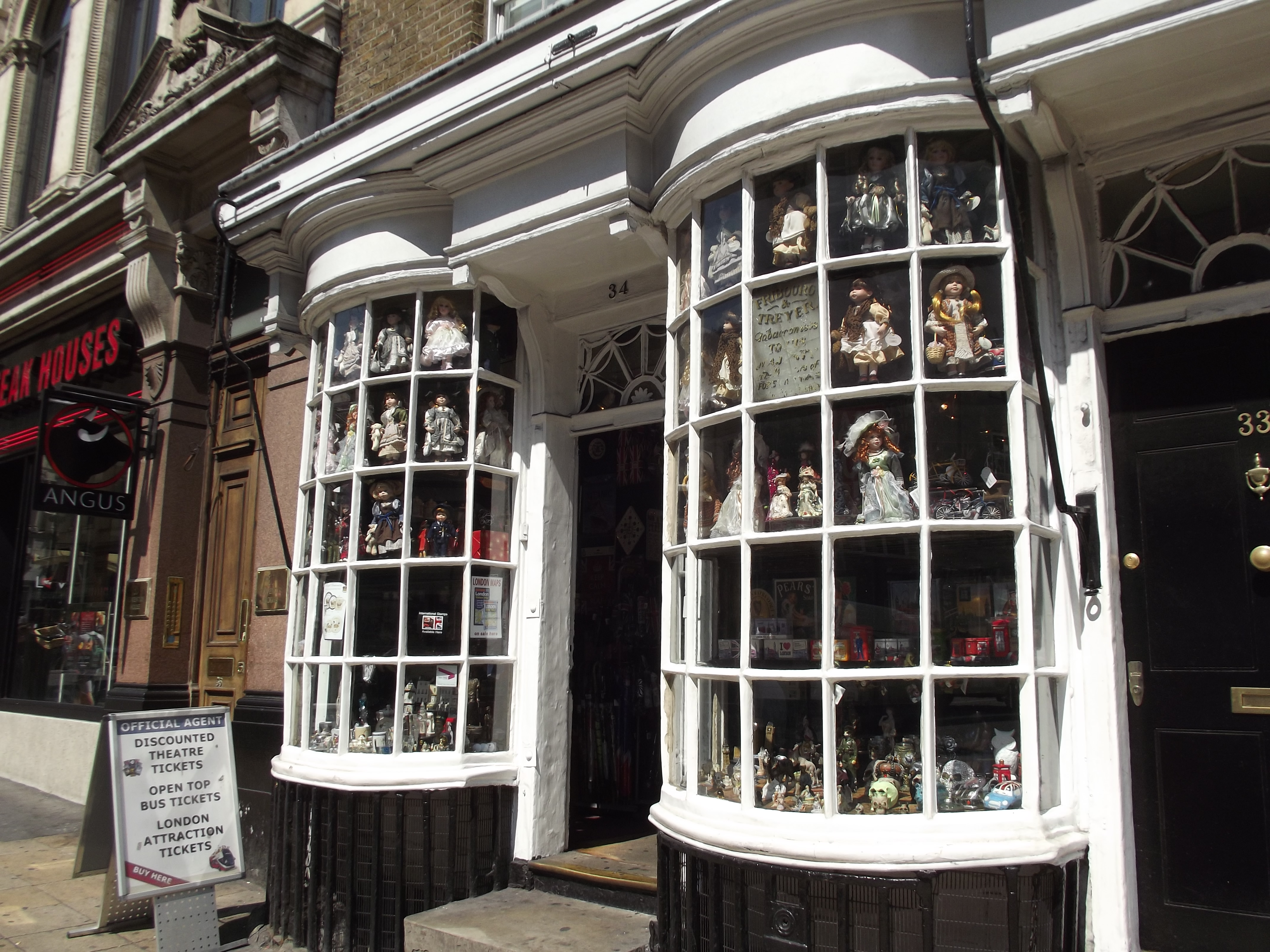
34 Haymarket

Fribourg & Treyer was a British snuff and tobacco manufacturer and retailer. It was founded by Mr Fribourg in 1720 at 34 Haymarket, London. They were famous for retailing Turkish tobacco. The business became Fribourg & Treyer, after the German-born Gottlieb Treyer married Mrs Martha Evans whose family had already entered into the business. They sold cigars and snuff and (from at least as early as 1852) cigarettes. Up to 1820, ninety per cent of the sales was snuff and only ten per cent tobacco. It was then fashionable to keep different snuffs for different times of day, and some fastidious people kept a special room for storing them. A very fine Adam screen of about 1750, still containing much of the original glass, divides the old part of the shop from the expansion at the back. In 1912 33 Haymarket was added to the premises when Burberry's relocated.

Customers included David Garrick, King George IV, and Beau Brummell.

The business closed in 1981. However, 34 Haymarket is a Grade II* listed building and the intact facade still exists. Nowadays, Wilsons of Sharrow, based in Sheffield, produces snuff under the F&T brand.
