= Belt dryer =

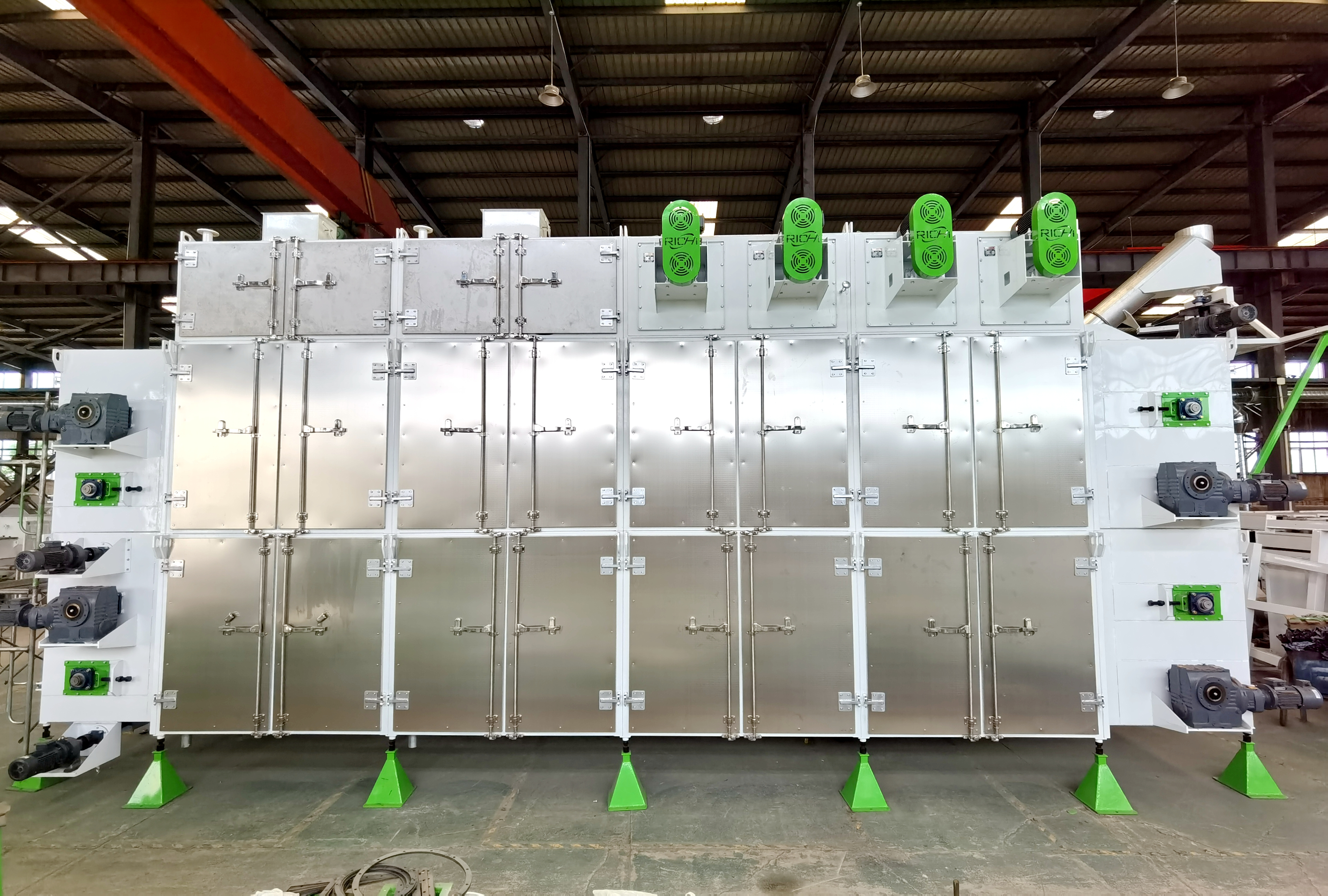
Belt dryer

A belt dryer (belt drier) is a kind of industrial dryer which is used for continuous drying and cooling of woodchips, pellets, pastes, molded compounds, and panels using air, inert gas, or flue gas.

== Working principle ==
A belt dryer or belt cooler is a device designed for the particularly gentle thermal treatment of product. The wet product is continuously and evenly applied through an infeed chamber onto a perforated belt. The belt, predominantly in horizontal position, carries the product through the drying area which is divided into several sections. In these cells drying gas flows through or over the wet product and dries it. Each cell can be equipped with a ventilating fan and a heat exchanger. This modular design allows the drying and cooling temperatures to be controlled separately in the different sections. Thus, each dryer cell can be individually controlled and the drying / cooling air flow can be varied in each cell. In addition, the speed of the conveyor belt can be varied what gives an additional parameter for setting of drying time. The cells can be heated or cooled directly or indirectly, and all heating media, such as oil, steam, hot water or hot gas can be used. Belt dryers are ideally suited to drying almost any non-flowing product and more granular products that require a lower throughput capacity.

== Design features ==
Belt dryers or belt coolers are designed in modular system. Each belt dryer consists of infeed hopper, conveyor belt, and discharge end. Different kinds of dryers are possible to construct, including single-belt, multi-stage, multi-level, and multi-belt dryers.

Ventilation options

In general there are two ways of gas flow pattern. The drying air can flow, according to the treatment process, either through or over the product.

Heat sources

Heat exchangers are commonly used for application where a biomass heat source is available such as woodchip boilers to produce hot water or if there is a steam heat source available. If a separate heat source is required a direct fired furnace with diesel, kerosene, LPG or natural gas burner can be used. Alternatively a heat exchanger with the same burner can be used for indirect heating if required.

Exemplary conveyor options

- Chain-guided wire mesh conveyor
- Chain-guided hinge slat conveyor
- Chain-guided steel plate conveyor
- Chainless wire mesh conveyor

Feeding variations

- Granulating mill – filter cake or amorphous and paste-like products respectively
- Slewing belt conveyor – sensitive and free flowing products
- Distribution spiral
- Rotatable arm feeding device – stable products
- Plates feeding

== Typical applications ==
Belt dryers are predominantly used in the following industries:

- Biomass
- Pelleting
- Wood industry
- Plastics industry
- Chemical industry
- Ceramics industry
- Anaerobic digestate
- Pharmaceutical industry
- Food and feeding-stuff industry
- Non-metallic minerals industry
