= Industrie und Glück =

Pattern of French suited Tarot playing cards

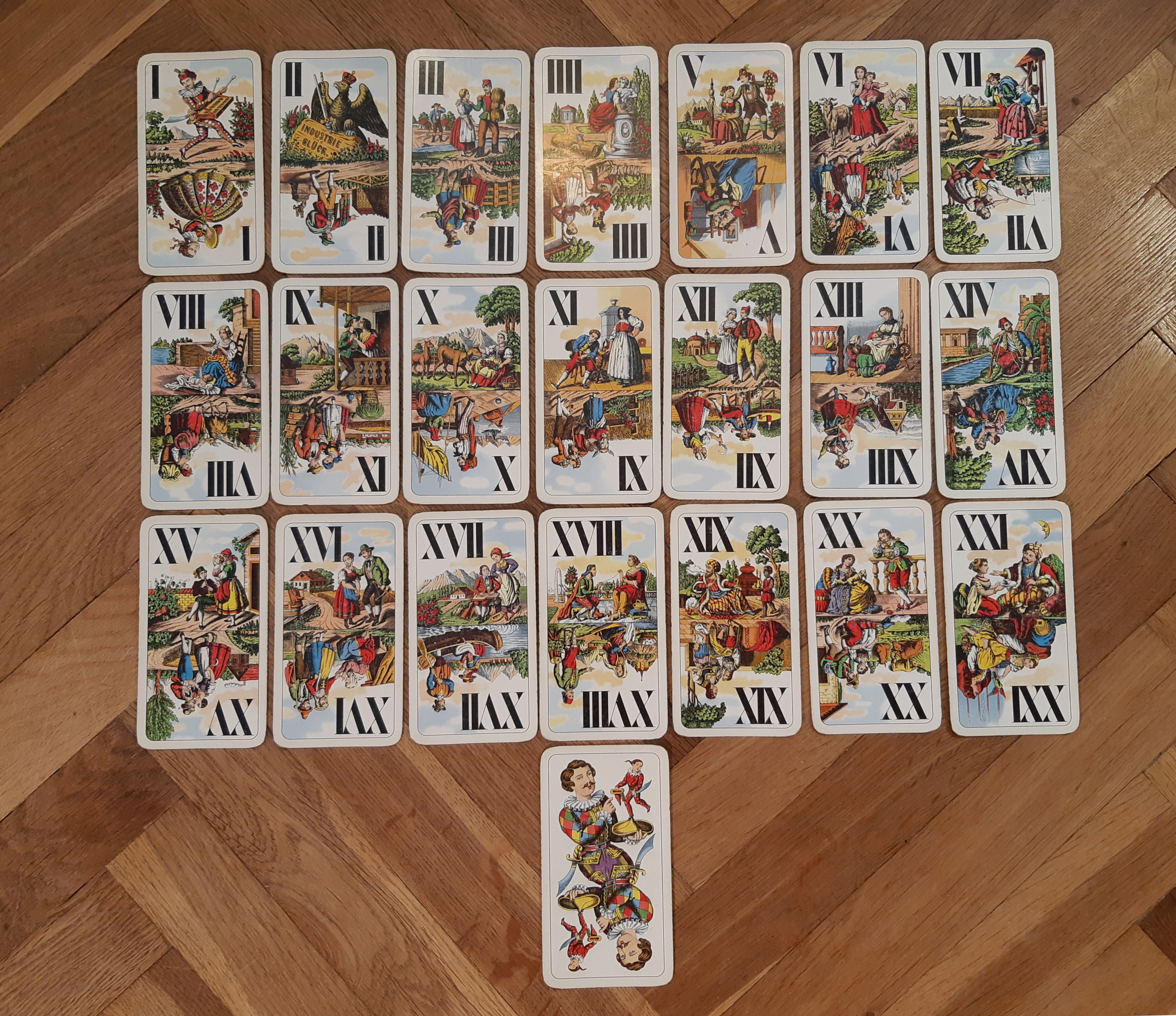
Industrie und Glück trumps (Type C)

Industrie und Glück (Early Modern German for "Diligence and Fortune" (Note: "Diligence and Fortune" was a contemporary meaning of the phrase Industrie und Glück and may have referred to the combination of skill and luck needed in Tarock games. See, for example, Placardi, Carl (1766). Das Kaiserliche Sprach- und Wörterbuch, Cölln am Rhein: Metternich, pp. 72 and 83, and Salzmann, W.F. (1837) Kurzgefaßtes Verdeutschungs-Wörterbuch, Kitzingen: Köpplinger, pp. 234 and 283.)) is a pattern of French suited playing cards used to play tarock. The name originates from an inscription found on the second trump card. This deck was developed during the nineteenth century in the Austro-Hungarian Empire. The earliest known examples were made in Vienna in 1815. After the collapse of the empire in World War I, it remained the most widely used tarot deck pattern in Central Europe and is used by almost all tarock players throughout the former parts of the empire.

== Composition ==
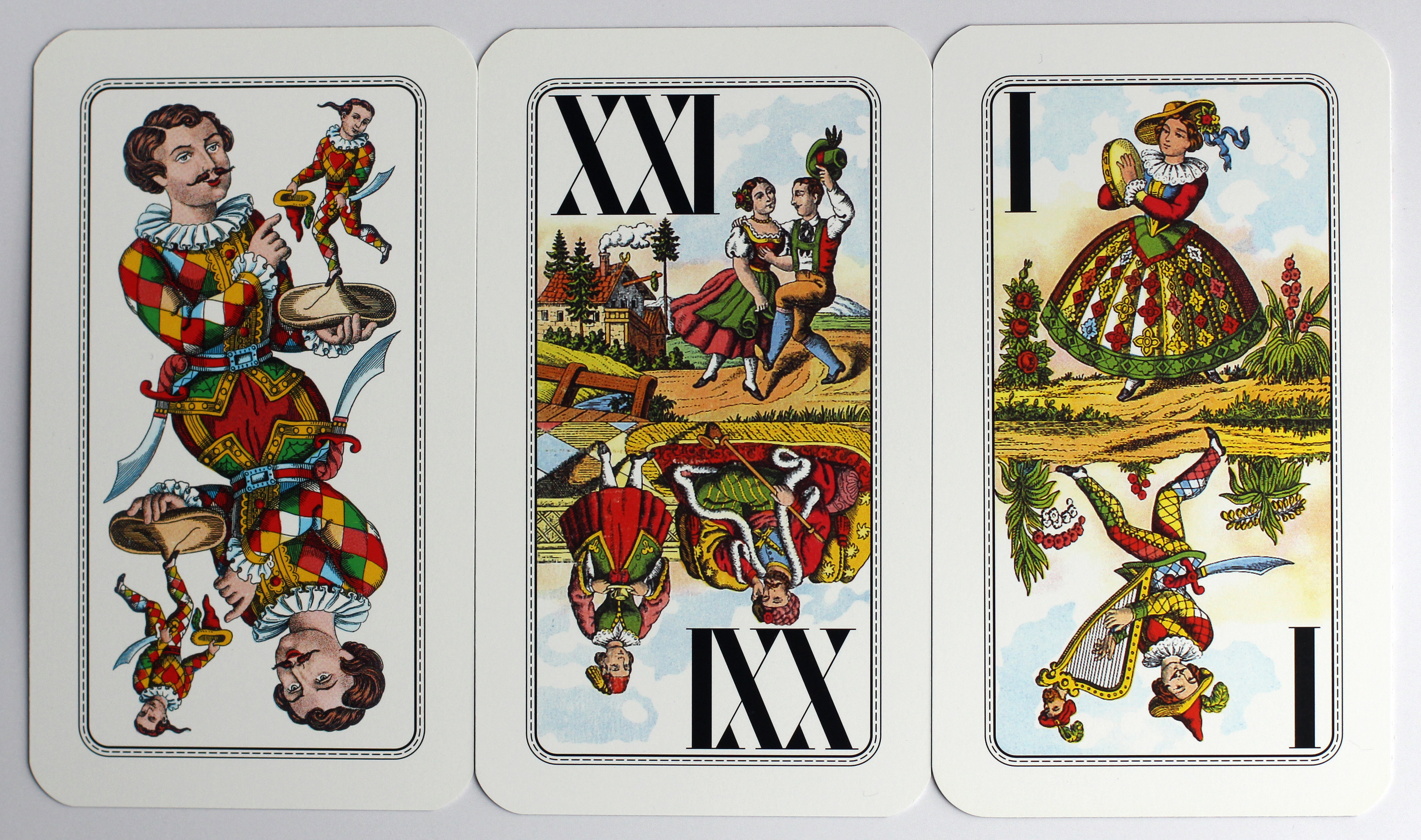
The trull in the southern version (Austrian Tarock Type B)

In the Industrie und Glück deck, each suit contains four face cards; the Jack, Cavalier, Queen, and King. The 5s through 10s in red suits and the 1s through 6s in the black suits are removed and 22 trumps are added for a total of 54 cards. In Central European tarock games, the order of the black suits from highest to lowest goes from K, Q, C, J, 10, 9, 8, 7 but the red suits goes from K, Q, C, J, 1, 2, 3, 4. The Sküs (The Fool), named after the French Excuse, is considered the 22nd and highest trump and no longer has its excusing power despite its name. The lowest trump is called the pagat after its Italian equivalent, il bagatto. Unlike the Italian tarocco decks which depict the original Renaissance allegorical motifs or even the French Tarot Nouveau which added modern themes, all Industrie und Glück trumps illustrate genre scenes of rural life with no themes. All trumps except the unnumbered Excuse use Roman numerals unlike the Tarot Nouveau or Cego decks. The pip cards and face cards lack corner indices.

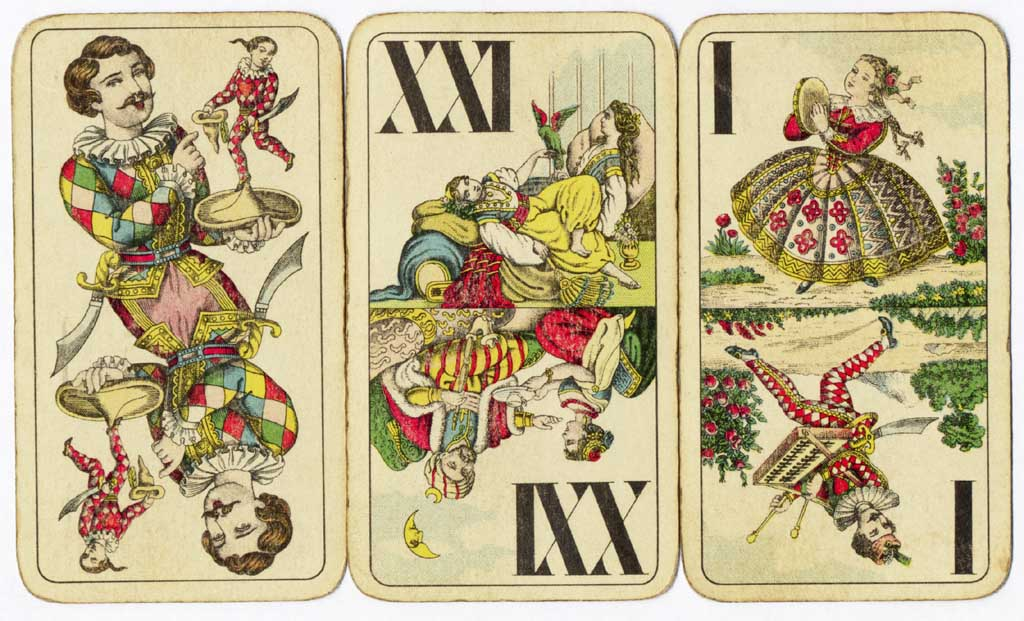
The trull (honours) in the northern version (Austrian Tarock Type C)

Around seven versions of this deck were once made, but only two have survived as standard packs. The older of the two surviving versions – designated by the IPCS as Type B – was established by 1865 and is still found today, primarily in the southern half of the former empire (Hungary, Croatia, Vojvodina, and Trieste) and the other later pattern – appearing around 1890 and designated as Type C – in the northern half (Austria, Slovenia, Czech Republic, Slovakia, Poland, and Romania). The southern version can also be found where the northern version is sold but is not as widespread. Both share many pictures in the trump suit but some are arranged differently. The 21st trump is nicknamed the Mond (moon) a mistranslation of the French name monde for The World tarot card. The northern version of the card features a crescent moon; the southern version, which is now manufactured only by Modiano and Piatnik, shows different scenes without a moon. The Czechs use the northern version but since receiving their independence at end of the First World War, the second trump has lacked the Industrie und Glück inscription.

42-card versions were printed until the late 20th century since some games like Zwanzigerrufen and Hungarian Tarokk do not require the pip cards below the black 10s and red 1s. Offset és Játékkártya Nyomda Zrt. of Budapest was the last manufacturer of this version. A 78-card version by Piatnik was once made to play Grosstarock (No. 1938); it was also adapted for the Austrian game of Droggn, although players used only 66 cards from the pack. There was also a mysterious 73-card version from the 1930s, also by Piatnik, which was composed like the 54-card deck but with 19 more trumps. It is believed to have been used for a lost version of Minchiate.

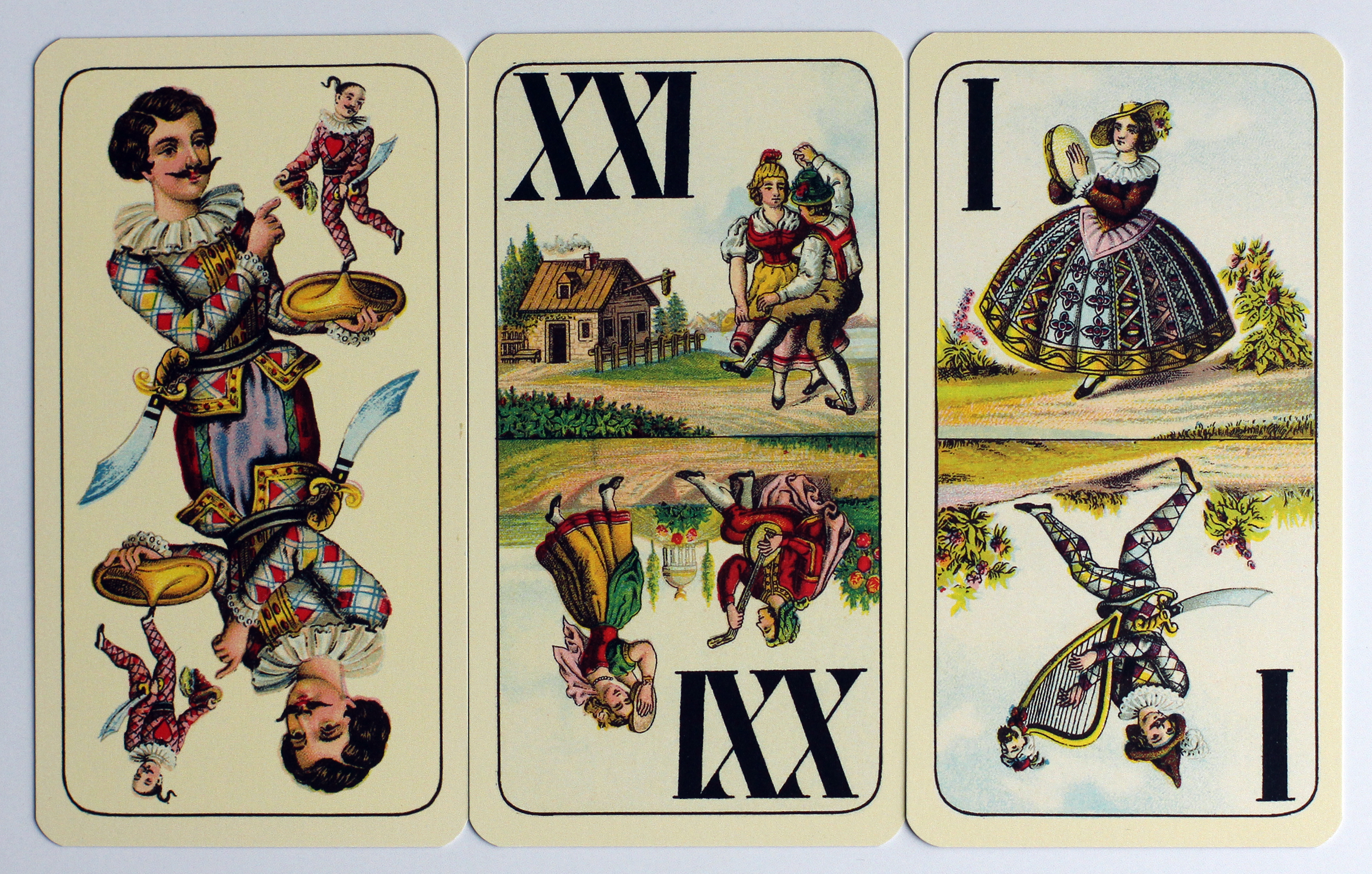
The trull from an Austrian Tarock Type A pack

Reprints of another early pattern, classified by the IPCS as the Type A Industrie und Glück pattern, are occasionally produced as limited editions. Like the Type B southern pattern, Type A was established by 1865 but had largely died out by the time of the First World War. Between 1910 and 1935, however, Piatnik produced a pack of cards using the Type A pattern, smaller in dimensions than the regular pack (52 x 97 mm as opposed to 63 x 113mm), (Note: And slightly smaller than a Schafkopf pack which is 56 x 100 mm.) ostensibly more suited for the smaller hands of women players and known as Allerfeinste Damen Tarock or "Ladies Tarock". A facsimile was produced by Piatnik in 2019.

== Other uses of imagery ==
Though Industrie und Glück packs were not designed for cartomancy, their imagery was incorporated into Argentine fortune telling decks produced in the mid-20th century and misleadingly presented as an ancient gypsy oracle.
