= Dreier (surname) =

Dreier is a family name of German origin.

People with the last name Dreier include:

- David Dreier, member of the United States House of Representatives
- Hannah Dreier, American journalist
- Hans Dreier, art film director
- James Dreier, American philosopher
- John Caspar Dreier, United States diplomat and academic
- Katherine Dreier, painter and art collector
- Marc Stuart Dreier, American lawyer convicted of fraud
- Sarah Dreier, Austrian ski mountaineer
- Thomas Dreier, American author and businessman

== See also ==
- Dreyer (disambiguation)
