= Kosakeln =

Two-hand Tarock card game

- Two-handed variant of Illustrated Tarock
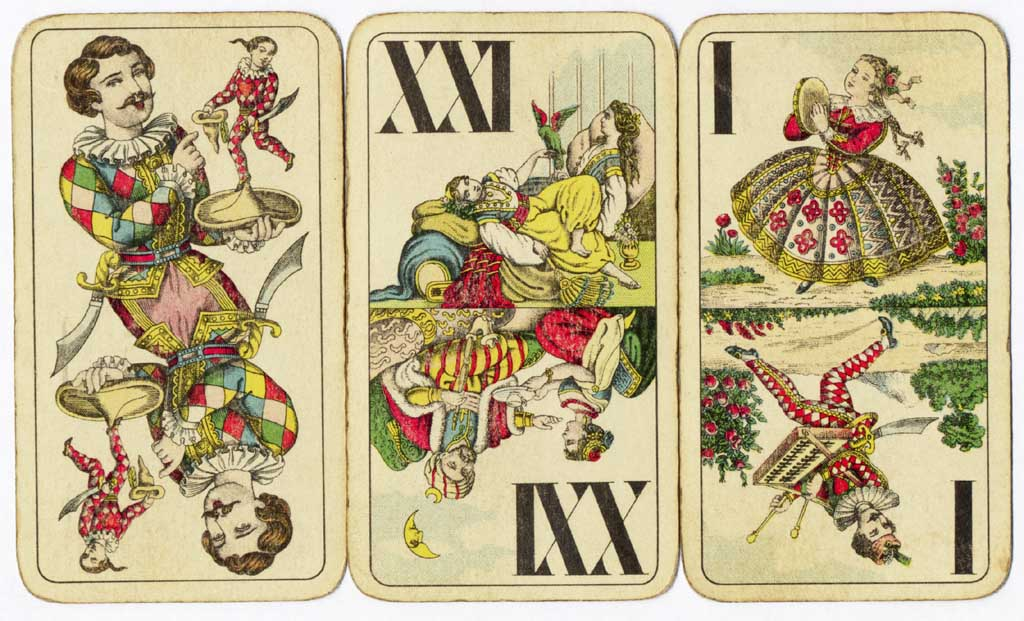
- A Trull
- Origin: Austria
- Type: Trick-taking
- Players: 2
- Cards: 54
- Deck: Industrie & Glück
- Rank (high→low): Tarock: Sküs, XXI-I ♣♠K Q C V 10–7 ♥♦ K Q C V 1–4
- Play: Alternating

Related games
- Strawman Tarock • Illustrated Tarock

Kosakeln ("Cossack") is a relatively recent, two-hand card game of the Austrian branch of the Tarock family. It is a two-handed version of the three-player game of Illustrated Tarock, itself an elaborate and challenging variant of Tapp Tarock.

== History and etymology ==
Kosakeln is one of a family of classical Austrian card games known as Tarock games; so much so, that the area of the former Austro-Hungarian Empire, in which they have a strong tradition has been described as 'Tarockania'. These games have been featured in literature such as Herzmanovsky-Orlando's Maskenspiel der Genien and Johann Nestroy's Zu ebener Erde und im ersten Stock. There are numerous variations of Tarock, many still played today, including the challenging four-player games of Königrufen (the "game of kings"), Zwanzigerrufen and Neunzehnerrufen, the original three-handed game of Tapp Tarock and its derivatives, Illustrated Tarock and Point Tarock, and the "attractive" two-hander of Strawman Tarock.

The rules of the two-handed game of Kosakeln have obvious similarities to those of the "queen of all Tarock games played with the 54-card pack", Illustrated Tarock, (Note: Sometimes called Point Tarock although that also refers to a different point-bidding game) and Dummett confirms that it is an adaptation of that game for two players. Illustrated Tarock emerges in the literature during the 1950s, Kosakeln itself being first recorded as Kosaken by Löw in 1956, followed shortly thereafter by Beck in 1961. The game has also featured more recently in Bamberger (2011) and Burgstaller (2017). Since Kosak is German for "Cossack", the name Kosakeln means "playing [the game of] Cossack". Hence if two Austrians say they are "playing Cossack", they are likely to be enjoying the Tarot game of Kosakeln. The name may therefore be a tribute to the influence of eastern Europe, especially Hungary, where Tarock games are popular and there may also be a connexion to the 3-player, 42-card, Tarock game of Husarln ("playing Hussar").

== Cards ==
Modern pack of Tarock cards by Piatnik of the type used for Kosakeln. This is the well known Industrie und Glück design, Type 6 by Josef Neumayer, 1890

Like other Tarock games played in Austria and the lands of the former Habsburg Empire, Kosakeln uses a 54-card deck of the type described at Königrufen. This pack contains 22 tarocks as trumps (I – XXI + Sküs) and 32 suit cards in the four French suits of Hearts, Diamonds, Spades and Clubs. The game uses the same values as other Austrian tarock games like Königrufen:

5 Points – Kings and Honours (I, XXI, Sküs); 4 Points – Queens; 3 Points – Cavaliers; 2 Points – Valets; 1 Point – remaining tarocks and pip cards.

As in other tarock games, scoring is carried out in groups of 3 cards. From the points in each group, 2 are deducted e.g. King + Cavalier + X = 9 points, minus 2 points gives 7 points. If fewer than 3 cards remain, 2/3 points are deducted from the total. 1/3 or 2/3 points are rounded up or down at the end to the nearest whole number.

== Rules ==
There are no official rules. Those given here follow Bamberger with some elaborations from Burgstaller.

=== Shuffling and dealing ===
The first dealer is chosen by lot; the player drawing the highest-ranking card wins. Dealer shuffles and forehand (non-dealer) cuts.

Six cards are laid face down to form the "Cossack talon". Dealer then deals 2 packets of 4 hand cards alternately so that forehand gets the first packet and dealer the second. Next, 2 packets of 4 cards are dealt, face down, in front of each player; these middle eight cards are the player's 'trick talon' or 'personal talon'. Finally a third batch of 2 × 4 cards are dealt as hand cards, each player now having 16 hand cards that he may view and 8 trick talon cards that he may not.

Next, each player selects eight hand cards to discard and places them to one side, face down. No Kings or Trulls may be discarded, nor any tarocks unless the player has no choice, in which case he must discard them face up. The discards count towards his score at the end. He then picks up the eight middle cards and adds them to his hand. Burgstaller describes this as the classic variant, but then describes three others:

- Medium-difficult: only plain suit cards may be discarded. If a player has fewer than eight, he discards what he can (no Kings) and picks up, unseen, the same number from his trick talon.
- Easy: players may exchange any number of cards up to eight (no Kings or Trulls).
- Tactical: players pick up the entire trick talon and then discard eight cards (no Kings or Trulls).

=== Bidding ===
The auction (Lizitation) proceeds as in Illustrated Tarock. Possible bids:

- Dreiblatt (Three cards) – declarer exposes Cossack talon and chooses the top or bottom 3 cards. Value: 3 points.
- Zweiblatt (Two cards) – declarer exposes Cossack talon and chooses the top, middle or bottom 2 cards. Value: 6 points.
- Einblatt (One card) – declarer exposes Cossack talon and selects one card. Value: 9 points.
- Solo (Solo) – declarer plays without the talon. Value: 12 points.

Beginning with forehand, players announce a bid, "hold" ("ich halte") or "pass" ("passe"). This may be done in sequence, e.g. "Dreiblatt" – "Zweiblatt" – "hold" – "pass", or players may jump straight to their highest bid e.g. "passe" – "Zweiblatt". Although Dummett says that bidding is exactly the same as in Illustrated Tarock and Beck's table does include the bid of Unterer, Burgstaller and Bamberger imply that there is no equivalent of Unterer or Unteren, whereby the dealer ups the stakes without also bidding a higher contract nor does holding a bid imply raising the game value.

The auction winner exchanges with the Cossack talon (see above), except for Solo. Discards are placed face down to join the previous ones. Cards from the Cossack talon that are not picked up go to the defender and are also placed face down with his earlier discards, counting towards his eventual score.

=== Announcements ===
As in Illustrated Tarock, announcements may be made before or after the declarer picks up from the talon, those made before are worth double (see Scoring below). Bamberger and Burgstaller give the possible announcements as:

Announcements in Kosakeln
Announcements listed by Bamberger and Burgstaller		Additional announcements listed by Burgstaller	
Announcement	Meaning	Announcement	Meaning
Pagat ultimo	taking the last trick with the Pagat (Tarock I)	Quapil	taking the pre-antepenultimate trick with the Tarock IV
Uhu (Note: Uhu is German for the eagle owl and a nickname for the eagle on the Tarock II)	taking the penultimate trick with the Tarock II	Four Birds	having Tarocks I-IV in one's original cards (Note: It is presumed that all these announcements for cards held in the 'original hand' refer to all those held in a player's hand cards, trick talon or picked up from the Cossack talon, but this is not explicitly stated)
Pelican	taking the antepenultimate trick with the Tarock III	Trull	having all 3 Trull cards in one's original cards
Absolute	scoring at least 40 points	Royal Trull/Four Kings	having all 4 Kings in one's original cards
Panzer	scoring at least 50 points		
without Trull	winning without having any Trull cards		
without Kings	winning without having any Kings		
Valat	winning every trick (a 'slam')		

=== Playing ===
Forehand leads to the first trick. The trick is won by the highest tarock or, if no tarock is played, the highest card of the led suit. Players must follow suit (Farbzwang) but do not have to win the trick (no Stichzwang). If the led suit cannot be followed, a tarock card must be played (Tarockzwang).

=== Scoring ===
The following scoring system is based on Bamberger with additions from Burgstaller who also uses hard score where 1 game point = 10 cents. The columns "before" and "after" refer to bonuses announced before and after the declarer exposes and exchanges cards with the Cossack talon, where applicable. Bonuses held in the hand are declared at the end of the game. (Note: Beck does not have a separate scoring system for Kosakeln but refers the reader to his rules for Illustrated Tarock. These vary considerably from the scoring table given here.)

Kosakeln scoring system
Contracts	Game value (G)	Declarer's use of talon						
Dreiblatt	3	Exchanges with top 3 or bottom 3 cards						
Zweiblatt	6	Exchanges with top, middle or bottom 2 cards						
Einblatt	9	Exchanges with one card of own choice from talon						
Solo	12	No exchange with talon						
Bonuses	Unannounced	Dreiblatt		Zweiblatt		Einblatt		Solo
Bonuses	(still)	after	before	after	before	after	before	Solo
Pagat ultimo	3	6	12	8	16	10	20	24
Uhu	3	7	14	10	20	12	24	28
Pelican	3	8	16	12	24	14	28	32
Quapil	3	9	18	14	28	16	32	36
Absolute	–	1	2	2	4	3	6	9
Panzer	–	3	6	6	12	12	24	28
Valat	G x 4	G x 8 (announced Valat)						
without Trull	–	1	2	2	4	3	6	9
without Kings	–	1	2	2	4	3	6	9
Trull	1	All 3 Trull cards held at start of game						
Royal Trull	1	All 4 Kings held at start of game						
Four Birds	3	All 4 'birds' (Tarocks I-IV) held at start of game						

== Literature ==
- Alscher, Hans-Joachim (ed.). "Tarock" mein einziges Vergnügen. Vienna (2003). ISBN 3-85498-283-6.
- Bamberger, Johannes (2011). Tarock: Die schönsten Varianten (22nd ed.). Vienna. ISBN 978-3-99006-000-1.
- Beck, Fritz (1961). Tarock komplett. Perlan-Reihe. Vol. 640 (3rd ed.). Vienna: Perlan-Reihe.
- Beck, Fritz (1983). Tarock komplett. Perlan-Reihe. Vol. 640 (12th ed.). Vienna: Perlan-Reihe.
- Burgstaller, Thomas (2017). Tarock zu Zweit. myMorawa, Austria: Buchschmiede. ISBN 978-3-99057-951-0.
- Dummett, Michael (1980). The Game of Tarot. London: Duckworth. ISBN 0-7156-1014-7.
- Löw, Hans (1954). 20 Kartenspiele (2nd ed.). Vienna: Pechan.
- Löw, Hans (1956). Tarock komplett (2nd ed.). Vienna: Pechan.
- Mayr, Wolfgang; Sedlaczek, Robert (2008). Die Strategie des Tarock Spiels. Vienna: Atelier. ISBN 978-3-902498-22-9.
- Ulmann, S. (1890). Das Buch der Familienspiele. Vienna, Munich and Pest: A. Hartleben.
- Worsch, Wolfgang (2004). Langenscheidt Muret-Sanders Großwörterbuch Deutsch-Englisch. Berlin: Langenscheidt. ISBN 3-468-02126-7.
