= Husarln =

Card game, an Austrian variant of Hungarian Tarok

- Austrian variant of Hungarian Tarok
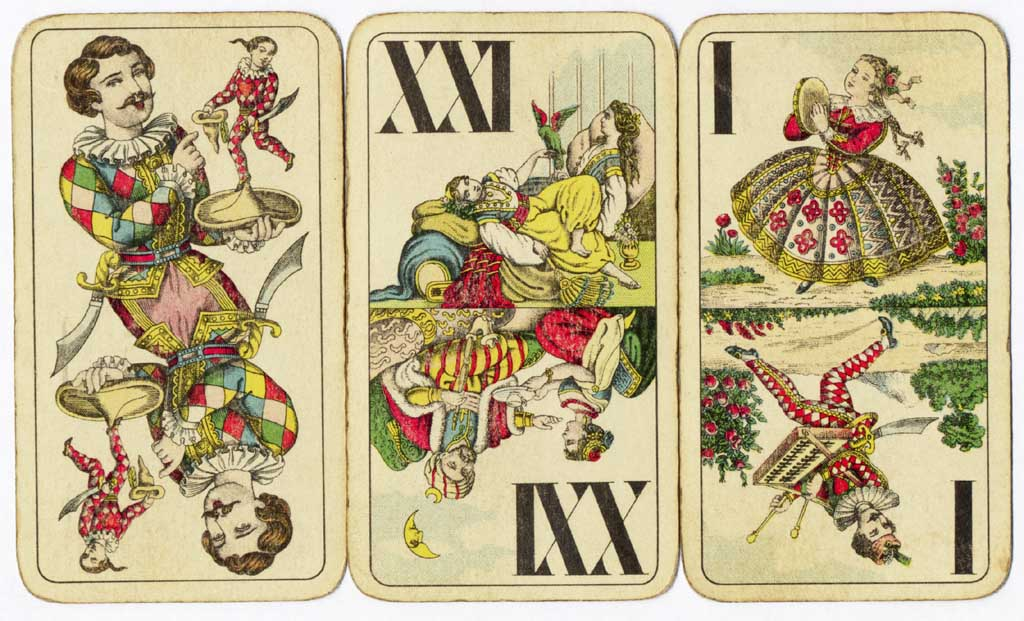
- A Trull
- Origin: Austria
- Type: Trick-taking
- Players: 3
- Cards: 42
- Deck: Industrie & Glück
- Rank (high→low): Tarock: Sküs, XXI-I ♣♠K Q C V 10 ♥♦ K Q C V A
- Play: Anticlockwise

Related games
- Hungarian Tarok • Illustrated Tarock

Husarln ("Hussar") is a mid-20th century, three-hand card game of the Austrian branch of the Tarot family. It is a 42-card variant of Illustrated Tarock and appears to be a close Austrian relative of the 42-card Hungarian tarock card games. The game is dominated by the distribution of Tarocks, giving it a "brisk and energetic feel" that is reflected in its name. It is also known as Block Tarock, although that name was given to a quite different and older game.

== History and etymology ==
Husarln is one of a family of classical Austrian card games known as Tarock games; so much so, that the area of the former Austro-Hungarian Empire, in which they have a strong tradition, has been described as 'Tarockania'. These games have been featured in literature such as Herzmanovsky-Orlando's Maskenspiel der Genien and Johann Nestroy's Zu ebener Erde und im ersten Stock. There are numerous variations of Tarock, many still played today, including the challenging four-player games of Königrufen (the "game of kings"), Zwanzigerrufen and Neunzehnerrufen, the original three-handed game of Tapp Tarock and its derivatives, Illustrated Tarock and Point Tarock, and the "attractive" two-hander of Strawman Tarock.

According to Dummett, Husarln is a close Austrian relative of the 42-card, three-handed Hungarian games such as Hungarian Tarok and Hungarian Tapper. In the earliest known rules, Löw states that the bidding is similar to that of Illustrated Tarock, (Note: Sometimes called Point Tarock although that also refers to a different point-bidding game) a game also first recorded by him in 1954. The game is later recorded by Beck (1965), Grupp (1975) and, more recently, by Bamberger (2011). Confusingly, Beck, Bamberger and Grupp call it Block Tarock which, as Dummett notes, is the name of an earlier and quite different game. However, all three note that it is also called Husarln. Since Husar is German for "Hussar", the name Husarln means "playing [the game of] Hussar". The name may therefore reflect a Hungarian origin in a similar way to the 2-player, 54-card game of Kosakeln ("playing Cossack"). Mayr and Sedlaczek note that Husarln is a "dialectic name for Tappen (Note: Tappen is another name for Tapp Tarock.) with 42 cards." The Kings lose their significance and the game is totally dominated by the distribution of the Tarocks [Tarot cards]. This gives the game "that brisk and energetic feel that is so succinctly expressed in its widely used name 'Hussar'".

== Cards ==
Modern pack of Tarock cards by Piatnik of the type used for Husarln. This is the well known Industrie und Glück design, Type 6 by Josef Neumayer, 1890

Like a number of other Tarock games played in Austria and the lands of the former Habsburg Empire, Husarln uses a 54-card deck of the Industrie und Glück type described at Königrufen (pictured), but with all the pip cards removed, bar the black Tens and red Aces, to leave 42 cards. Thus the pack contains 22 tarocks as trumps (numbered from I to XXI plus the Sküs) and 20 suit cards in the four French suits of Hearts, Diamonds, Spades and Clubs. Tarocks rank from Sküs (highest) then XXI to I (lowest). Suit cards rank K Q C V 10 in the black suits and K Q C V A in the red suits. The game uses the same values as other Austrian Tarock games like Königrufen: the Kings and Trull cards (Sküs, Pagat and Tarock 21) are worth 5, Queens 4, Cavaliers 3, Valets 2 and the rest 1 card point each.

== Rules ==
There are no official rules. The game follows the basic rules of Tarock games, with the exception that, because only 42 of the usual 54 cards are used, only 34 points are needed to win. Bidding is similar to that in Illustrated Tarock with bids of Zweiblatt ("Two Cards"), Einblatt ("One Card") and Solo, but the lowest bid, Dreiblatt ("Three Cards"), is omitted. The rules given here follow Löw (1956) except where stated.

=== Shuffling and dealing ===
After shuffling, the dealer lays the first six cards face down on the table as the talon. He then deals 12 cards to each player in 2 packets of six cards.

=== Bidding ===
The auction (Lizitation) proceeds as in Illustrated Tarock, but there is no bid of Dreiblatt ("Three Cards"). Beginning with forehand, players may either "pass" ("weiter"), overcall the highest current bid, "hold" (mein Spiel) the highest bid if they have positional priority, (Note: Positional priority means they were earlier in the bidding process. So forehand has priority over middlehand who has priority over rearhand (the dealer).) or say "good" (gut) to indicate they are dropping out of the bidding. A player who has passed, may not re-enter the bidding. The possible bids are:

==== Zweiblatt ====
In a Zweiblatt ("Two Cards"), the declarer turns up the top two cards of the talon. If he 'buys' them without looking at the other four, the game is worth 2 points. He adds the pair to his hand and selects two cards to discard, face down. If he rejects the first two cards and, instead, turns over and buys the next two, the game is worth 4 points. If he rejects those and picks up the remaining two cards, the game value rises to 6. If, after exposing all six cards, he goes back to the first two, the game is now worth 8 points. Finally if he goes back to the second pair of cards, the game value rises to 10 points. If the declarer picks the first or second pair without exposing the remaining four or two cards respectively, those unseen cards remain face down and count towards the defenders at the end of the game. All exposed cards count to the declarer. The two cards discarded in exchange for talon cards count to the declarer at the end of the game. They may not include any honours (Kings or Trull cards) and may only include a Tarock if there is no other option, in which case it must be shown to the defenders.

==== Einblatt ====
In an Einblatt ("One Card") a similar procedures is followed. The declarer initially turns over the top card of the talon and, if he buys it, the game is worth 3 points. For turning over subsequent cards the game value is: second card - 6 points, third card - 9 points, fourth card - 12 points, fifth card - 15 points and sixth card - 18 points. If the declarer returns to the first card the game is now worth 21 points, the second - 24, the third - 27, the fourth - 30 and the fifth - 33. The same rules about discards and unexposed cards apply as in a Zweiblatt.

==== Solo ====
In a Solo the declarer plays without the use of the talon for 40 game points.

=== Announcements ===
Once the declarer has made any discard(s), he may make one or more of the following announcements, followed by the other players:

Announcements and bonuses in Husarln
| Announcements listed by Löw, Beck and Bamberger | | | | Additional announcements listed only by Bamberger | | | |
| Announcement | Meaning | Bonus | | Announcement | Meaning | Bonus | |
| | | Silent | Announced | | | Silent | Announced |
| Pagat ultimo | taking the last trick with the Pagat (Tarock I) | 5 | 10 | Uhu (Note: Uhu is German for the eagle owl and a nickname for the eagle on the Tarock II) (Note: Bamberger indicates that this bonus is not standard and should be pre-agreed.) | taking the penultimate trick with the Tarock II | 5 | 12 |
| Trull | having all 3 Trull cards in the hand before play starts (Note: Löw insists that this must be announced before play starts; Beck allows it at the end, but before dealing for the next game.) | – | 3 | Pelican | taking the antepenultimate trick with the Tarock III | 5 | 14 |
| 10 Tarocks | having 10 Tarocks in the hand before play starts (Note: Beck makes clear that Tarocks discarded in the exchange with the talon may not be included in the count for these bonuses.) | – | 1 | Kings | having all four Kings in tricks at the end | – | 3 |
| 11 Tarocks | having 11 Tarocks in the hand before play starts | – | 2 | | | | |
| 12 Tarocks | having 12 Tarocks in the hand before play starts | – | 3 | | | | |
All bonuses are worth double in a Solo (Note: This is not stated by Löw, but is explicit in Beck and Bamberger.)

=== Playing ===
Forehand leads to the first trick. The trick is won by the highest tarock or, if no tarock is played, the highest card of the led suit. Players must follow suit (Farbzwang) but do not have to win the trick (no Stichzwang). If the led suit cannot be followed, a tarock card must be played (Tarockzwang). Tricks must be placed face down; players may view their own tricks, but not their opponents'.

=== Scoring ===
As in other Tarock games, scoring is carried out in two stages. First, the card points or 'pips' (Augen) are added up to determine the winner of the deal. Second, the game points for winning and for bonuses are calculated and added to the players' scores for the session. Card points are counted in threes using the usual Tarock system. The card values are: Kings and Honours (I, XXI, Sküs) – 5; Queens – 4; Cavaliers – 3; Valets – 2; remaining Tarocks, Aces and Tens – 1 point. From the total points for each group of 3 cards, 2 card points are deducted e.g. King + Cavalier + XII = 9 points, minus 2 points gives 7 points. If fewer than 3 cards remain, 2/3 points are deducted from the total. 1/3 or 2/3 points are rounded up or down at the end to the nearest whole number.

The following table shows the game points scores used by Löw, Beck and Bamberger for comparison. These are added to the player's bonuses to work out his total score in game points. Bamberger acknowledges that the normal scoring system (Bam 1 in the table) appears to be rather illogical; for example, if a player has a good hand in combination with the first pair or first card that he turns over, why would he not then turn over the rest of the pack in order just to increase his potential points? To that end, he records a variant with a more logical scoring scheme (Bam 2 in the table).

Husarln scoring system
| Contract | Card selection | Löw | Beck | Bam 1 | Bam 2 |
| Zweiblatt | 1st pair | 2 | 3 | 3 | 12 |
| Zweiblatt | 2nd pair | 4 | 6 | 6 | 9 |
| Zweiblatt | 3rd pair | 6 | 9 | 9 | 6 |
| Zweiblatt | back to 1st | 8 | 12 | 12 | 3 |
| Zweiblatt | back to 2nd | 10 | 15 | 15 | 3 |
| Einblatt | 1st card | 3 | 4 | 4 | 28 |
| Einblatt | 2nd card | 6 | 8 | 8 | 24 |
| Einblatt | 3rd card | 9 | 12 | 12 | 20 |
| Einblatt | 4th card | 12 | 16 | 16 | 16 |
| Einblatt | 5th card | 15 | 20 | 20 | 12 |
| Einblatt | 6th card | 18 | 24 | 24 | 8 |
| Einblatt | back to 1st | 21 | 28 | 28 | 4 |
| Einblatt | back to 2nd | 24 | 32 | 32 | 4 |
| Einblatt | back to 3rd | 27 | 36 | 36 | 4 |
| Einblatt | back to 4th | 30 | 40 | 40 | 4 |
| Einblatt | back to 5th | 33 | 44 | 44 | 4 |
| Solo | – | 40 | 8 or 40 | 50 (Note: Bamberger does not actually mention a score for Solo under the normal scheme, but it should logically be higher than the highest Einblatt contract.) | 36 |

Note: the column 'Card Selection' refers to the process for exposing and selecting cards from the talon. e.g. "1st pair" means that the player has declared a Zweiblatt and selected the first 2 cards of the talon without exposing any of the others. "Back to 4th" means that the player has declared an Einblatt and has successively exposed all the cards of the talon and decided to go back and choose the 4th card he turned over.

== Literature ==
- Bamberger, Johannes (2011). Tarock: Die schönsten Varianten (22nd ed.). Vienna. ISBN 978-3-99006-000-1.
- Beck, Fritz (1965). Tarock komplett (4th ed.). Vienna: Perlen-Reihe.
- Beck, Fritz (1983). Tarock komplett. Perlan-Reihe. Vol. 640 (12th ed.). Vienna: Perlan-Reihe.
- Dummett, Michael (1980). The Game of Tarot. London: Duckworth. ISBN 0-7156-1014-7.
- Grupp, Claus D. (1975). Kartenspiele. Wiesbaden: Falken-Verlag Erich Sicker. ISBN 3-8068-2001-5.
- Löw, Hans (1954). 20 Kartenspiele (2nd ed.). Vienna: Pechan.
- Löw, Hans (1956). Tarock komplett (2nd ed.). Vienna: Pechan.
- Löw, Hans (1967). 20 verschiedene Kartenspiele. Vienna.
- Mayr, Wolfgang; Sedlaczek, Robert (2008). Die Strategie des Tarock Spiels. Vienna: Atelier. ISBN 978-3-902498-22-9.
- Ulmann, S. (1890). Das Buch der Familienspiele. Vienna, Munich and Pest: A. Hartleben.
- Worsch, Wolfgang (2004). Langenscheidt Muret-Sanders Großwörterbuch Deutsch-Englisch. Berlin: Langenscheidt. ISBN 3-468-02126-7.
