= Dreiertarock =

Austrian card game

- An interesting Tarot game that demands a high level of skill
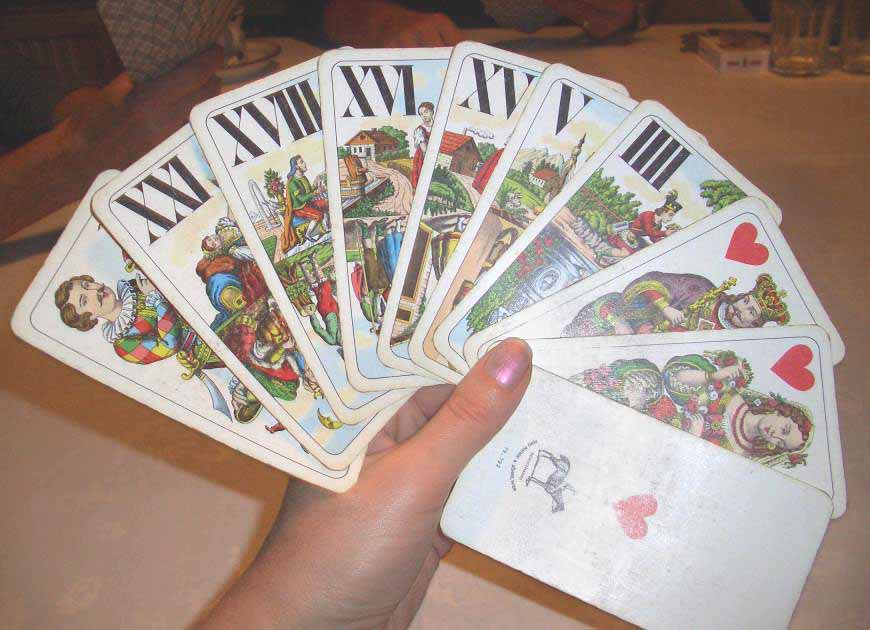
- Origin: Austria
- Type: Trick-taking
- Players: 3
- Skills: Tactics, Strategy
- Cards: 54
- Deck: Industrie und Glück
- Rank (high→low): Trumps: Sküs, XXI-I ♣♠ K Q C J 10 9 8 7 ♥♦ K Q C J 1 2 3 4
- Play: Anticlockwise
- Playing time: 20 min.

Related games
- Strohmandeln • Tapp Tarock • Illustrated Tarock • Point Tarock

Dreiertarock is a 3-handed card game of the Austrian Tarock family. Although less popular than it once was, it is still played in Austria, especially in Carinthia, and in neighboring Slovenia. In 2013, it was one of five variants of Tarock game competed for in the International Piatnik Tarock Tournament (Internationales Piatnik-Tarockturnier) in Vienna. For a long time, three-handed variants of Tarock were played alongside the four-handed games and were very popular everywhere in Austria. They have since fallen behind in popularity which "is a pity because they are interesting variants which demand a high level of skill". They remain popular in Slovenia.

== Aim ==
As the declarer, to score 36 points out of a total of 70 while maximising the game and bonus points. As the two defenders to prevent the declarer winning, while also seeking to earn bonus points.

== Rules ==
The following rules are based on Mayr and Sedlaczek, except where stated:

=== Dealing ===
Eight cards are dealt to each player in anticlockwise order, beginning with forehand; then 2 packets of 3 cards are placed, face down, on the table as the talon. Finally, another 8 cards are dealt to each player.

=== Bidding ===
Forehand announces "Einser" ("one-er") or "Weiter!" ("pass"). Rearhand can pass or raise this to a "Zweier" ("two-er"). Further bids of Dreier, Vierer and Fünfer may be announced, each raising the game value by one increment. The bids must follow in sequence without any being skipped. Moreover, a player who has been overbid must either 'pass' (Weiter) or 'hold' (ich halte). If they hold, they are offering to play the game at the same value and have priority unless they are, in turn, overbid. So a typical sequence is: Einser - Zweier - Weiter - Ich halte - Weiter. In the case of an Einser, Zweier, etc, the winner of the auction, the declarer, may go on to make use of the talon. To do this, both packets of the talon are turned over and laid face up so that all cards are visible. The declarer then picks up one of the two packets and adds it to his hand before discarding three cards of his choice. He then plays as a soloist against the other two players.

If a player feels he has a particularly strong hand, he may bid for a Solo or Solo Valat. He must do so at the first opportunity during the bidding. A Solo is an undertaking to win the game without using the talon and outranks the Einser, Zweier, etc. announcements. A Solo Valat is an undertaking to win every trick without the talon - in effect a slam.

The final phase of bidding is where various bonuses may be announced (see Scoring).

=== Playing ===
Forehand leads to the first trick. Players must follow suit (Farbzwang) or trump (Tarockzwang), but do not have to play to win each trick (i.e. there is no Stichzwang).

=== Scoring ===
==== Card points ====
Card points are totalled in the normal way for Tarock games i.e. the cards won are grouped in threes. Each packet of three cards is totted up and 2 card points subtracted. The totals are added to work out the score. A player must score at least 35 points + 2 Blatt to win i.e. 35 and 2/3, which is then rounded up to 36. See scoring in Königrufen.

==== Game values and bonuses ====
The game values and bonus points (reckoned in cents) are as follows:

Game values and bonuses in Dreiertarock
Contracts	Points	Bonuses	Meaning	Silent (Note: "Silent" means the bonuses were not announced.)	Announced
Einser	30	Tarock Trull	taking all 3 'honours' (Sküs, XXI, I) in tricks	10	–
Zweier	40	Royal Trull	taking all four Kings in tricks.	10	–
Dreier	50	Mondfang	capturing the Mond (Tarock XXI) with the Sküs.	10	–
Vierer	60	Pagat Ultimo	winning the last trick with the Pagat (Tarock I).	40	80
Fünfer	70	Uhu	winning the penultimate trick with Tarock II.	60	120
Solo	120	Kike	winning the antepenultimate trick with Tarock III.	80	160
Solo Valat	960	–	–	–	–

== Bibliography ==
- Kastner, Hugo and Gerald Kador Folkvord (2005). Die große Humboldt-Enzyklopädie der Kartenspiele. Humboldt, Baden-Baden, pp. 246-248. ISBN 978-3-89994-058-9.
- Mayr, Wolfgang; Sedlaczek, Robert (2008). Die Strategie des Tarockspiels. Vienna: Atelier. ISBN 978-3-902498-22-9.
