= Point Tarock =

Three-player tarot card game

- A "spiced up" version of the classic game Tapp Tarock
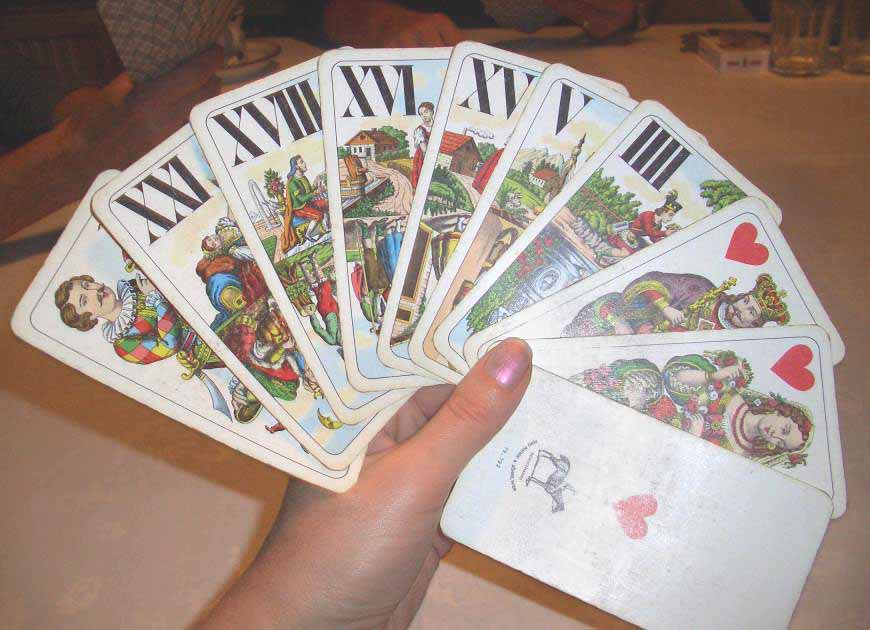
- Origin: Austria
- Type: Trick-taking
- Players: 3
- Skills: Tactics, Strategy
- Cards: 54
- Deck: Industrie und Glück
- Rank (high→low): Trumps: Sküs, XXI-I ♣♠ K Q C J 10 9 8 7 ♥♦ K Q C J 1 2 3 4
- Play: Anti-clockwise
- Playing time: 20 min.
- Chance: Moderate

Related games
- Illustrated Tarock • Tapp Tarock

Point Tarock was a three-player tarot card game, played mainly in Austria, which used the 54-card Industrie und Glück deck. It is probably extinct. Furr describes it as being "identical to Tapp but for the addition of a special announcement, allowing a Declarer to capitalize on a very good hand... spicing up the game considerably." Point Tarock is sometimes confused with its close cousin, Illustrated Tarock.

== History and etymology ==
Point Tarock is one of a family of classical Austrian card games known as Tarock games; so much so, that the area of the former Austro-Hungarian Empire, in which they have a strong tradition, has been described as 'Tarockania'. These games have been featured in literature such as Herzmanovsky-Orlando's Masquerade of the Genii and Johann Nestroy's Zu ebener Erde und im ersten Stock. There are numerous variations of Tarock, many still played today, including the challenging four-player games of Königrufen (the "game of kings"), Zwanzigerrufen and Neunzehnerrufen, the original three-handed game of Tapp Tarock and its derivatives, and the "attractive" two-hander of Strawman Tarock.

The earliest known rules for Point Tarock are recorded (as Illustrated Tarock) by Löw in 1954 where he describes it as played "according to the rules of the normal Tarock game differing... only in the fact that there are new announcements" which the declarer can make and which commit him or her to winning additional points. In 1965, Beck switches the names of the two games referring to this version now as Point Tarock (Pointtarock) . He continues to do so for the next two decades. The only subsequent record of its rules is published by Alscher in 2004 where, again it is referred to as Illustrated Tarock, a name that, however, has become increasingly associated with its more popular and complex cousin.

== Name ==
There is no consensus over the name of this game, which was variously called Point Tarock or Illustrated Tarock (Illustriertes Tarock). Confusingly its more complex cousin is also called Illustrated Tarock or Point Tarock or both. Since Point means "point" and illustriertes implies "embellished", there is a logic in using Point Tarock for this variant which involves point-bidding and Illustrated Tarock for its more ornamented cousin (Dummett suggests "embroidered") with additional announcements and bonuses. The game may in any case now be obsolete, being noticeably absent from Bamberger's successor to Löw's and Beck's Tarock series.

== Cards ==
The game is played with the 54-card French-suited Industrie und Glück deck. It includes 22 trumps numbered in Roman numerals with the exception of the highest, the Sküs or Fool. The second highest trump, the XXI, is known as the Mond while the lowest trump, I, is called the Pagat. The Sküs, Mond, and Pagat are together known as the Trull or "Honours" and are worth 5 points each. Other trumps are worth only 1 point.

The 32 plain suit cards consist of four courts: King, Queen, Cavalier and Valet, along with four pip cards. The cards rank as follows:

- In black suits: King, Queen, Cavalier and Valet 10, 9, 8 and 7
- In red suits: King, Queen, Cavalier and Valet, 1, 2, 3 and 4.

Kings and Honours are worth 5 points, Queens 4, Cavaliers 3, Valets 2, and the pips 1. Like score counting in other Tarock games, 2 points are subtracted from each trick taken. There are 70 card points in each deal, so to win, the Declarer needs at least 36 points. Other than card points there are bonus points as described below.

== Differences from Illustrated Tarock ==
Point Tarock is sometimes called Illustrated Tarock, for example by Furr, while others, such as Bamberger and Dummett, refer to Illustrated Tarock as Point Tarock. The main differences are:

- Point Tarock has no Zweiblatt ("Two Card") or Einblatt ("One Card") contracts
- The only announcements are those that offer to score specific numbers of points over 36 (hence the name)
- Announcements may be made before or after exchanging with the talon; this affects the value of the contract

== Rules ==
=== Shuffling and dealing ===
Dealing takes places as in other three-hand Tarock games. After the cards have been shuffled and cut, the dealer sets out six cards face down on the table (the talon) and then deals each player 16 cards, anticlockwise, in two packets of eight each.

=== Bidding ===
Forehand, to the right of the dealer, now opens the bidding with "pass" or Dreier. Middlehand may also pass or raise to an Untern. The dealer, rearhand (Hinterhand), may pass or raise. Apart from Solo, the contracts must be bid for in ascending order. A player who has been overbid by a 'younger' or more 'junior' player may "hold" and has positional priority unless overbid again. The highest bidder becomes the declarer and plays alone against the other two players (the "defenders"). The bidding increments are as follows:

- Dreier - 3 game points.
- Unterer - 4 game points.
- Oberer - 5 game points.

In each case, the declarer exposes the talon, lays out the cards in order and takes either the first or last three cards from the talon. The declarer then discards three cards from her hand and places it onto her trick pile, these three count as her first trick. Kings or Trull cards may not be discarded; other trumps can't be discarded unless there is no other option. All discarded cards must be shown to the defenders. The remaining cards from the talon are added to the defenders' trick pile. (Note: The names of the two higher bids – Unterer and Oberer – mean "lower" and "upper" and may refer to a time when the declarer had to pick up the lower or upper half of the talon. This rule is sometimes still seen in other variants of three-hand Tarock.)

=== Announcements ===
Once the declarer has exchanged with the talon, she must decide how good her hand is and then announce the number of card points she will contract to win. The options attract additional game points and are as follows:

- with 40 - 3 game points
- with 45 - 6 game points
- with 50 - 10 game points
- with 55 - 15 game points

Bids are cumulative i.e. each bid also includes the lower ones and may be kontra'd in whole or in part. So the declarer may announce "with 50!" and an opponent may say "Kontra the 50!" which means the kontra only applies to scores of 50 or more.

=== Bonuses ===
The rules on bonuses are variable but typically include:

- Pagat Ultimo: any player wins the last trick with Trump I, the Pagat
- Valat: player takes all tricks

== Winning ==
If the declarer achieves her target, she wins the points above. If she announced "with 50" but only scores 46 card points, she pays each defender 1 point i.e. 10 points for the lost "with 50" minus 3+6 for the won "with 40" and "with 45".

== Bibliography ==
- Alscher, Hans-Joachim, ed. (2003). "Tarock" mein einziges Vergnügen. Vienna. ISBN 3-85498-283-6.
- Bamberger, Johannes (2011). Tarock: Die schönsten Varianten (22nd ed.). Vienna. ISBN 978-3-99006-000-1.
- Beck, Fritz (1983). Tarock Komplett: Alle Spiele. Vienna: Perlag-Reihe.
- Dummett, Michael (1980a). The Game of Tarot. London: Duckworth.
- Dummett, Michael (1980b). Twelve Tarot Games. London: Duckworth. ISBN 0-7156-1488-6.
- Furr, Jerry Neill (2009). "Illustrated Tapp". Tarocchi: An introduction to the many games played with tarot cards. Jerry Neill Furr. ISBN 9781448609727.
- Löw, Hans (1954). 20 Kartenspiele (2nd ed.). Vienna: Pechan.
- Ulmann, S. (1890). Das Buch der Familienspiele. Vienna, Munich and Pest: A. Hartleben.
- Mayr, Wolfgang; Sedlaczek, Robert (2001). Das große Tarock Buch. Vol. 642. Vienna – Frankfurt/M. o. J.: Perlen Reihe. ISBN 3-85223-462-X.
- Mayr, Wolfgang; Sedlaczek, Robert (2016). Die Strategie des Tarock Spiels (5th expanded ed.). Vienna: atelier. ISBN 978-3-902498-22-9.
