= Strohmandeln =

Austrian two-hand card game

- "Rather fun and well worth learning"
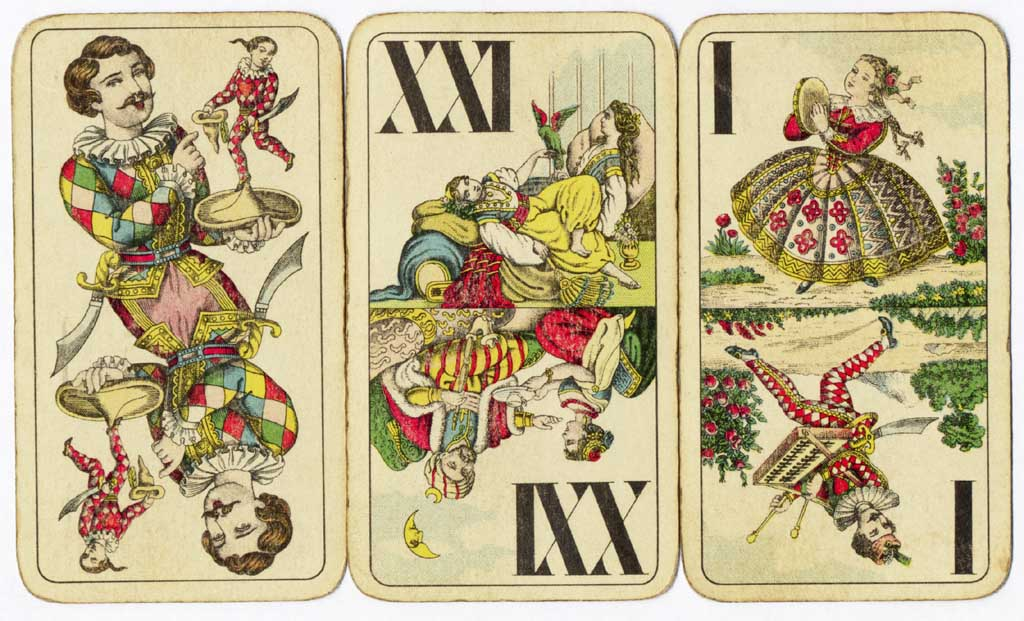
- A Trull
- Origin: Austria
- Type: Trick-taking
- Players: 2
- Cards: 54
- Deck: Industrie & Glück
- Rank (high→low): Tarock: Sküs, XXI-I ♣♠K Q C V 10 – 7 ♥♦ K Q C V 1 – 4
- Play: Alternating
- Playing time: 18 minutes/hand

Related games
- Tapp-Tarock • Kosakeln

Strohmandeln, also called Strohmandel, Strohmanntarock, Strohmanntarok, Zweiertarock, Strawman Tarock or Straw Man Tarock, is an old, two-hand card game from the Austrian branch of the Tarock family. It takes its name from the three-packet talon of four cards, the Strohmänner ("strawmen"), each player has at the start of the game. While the original game has been described as jejune, it was eventually superseded by an attractive successor which is both challenging and very exciting.

== History ==
The forerunner to Strohmandeln was a two-hand variant of the 78-card Tarock game recorded as early as early as 1800 in a Viennese games compendium, Neuestes Spielbuch, where it was called "Taroc en deux" in which a face-down dummy of 25 cards was dealt but never used during the game. The 54-card version first appeared in 1829, when it was described as "Tarok-Tappen between two players or the so-called Strohmandel". However, in these rules the dummy or 'straw man' was actually used; the winner of a trick picking up the top card of the straw man pile and adding it to his trick cards. This game was easy to win if the straw man yields a lot of Kings and other court cards, leaving an opponent with just tarocks or Skartindels (low-counting cards). But, according to an 1839 Austrian games compendium, because the game depends more on luck than skill, it "would probably only be chosen by people who are completely unaware of the noble game of Piquet." Fortunately by no later than 1890, this "rather jejune game was ousted by a much better and quite different one"; a genuine two-player game in which the 'straw men' comprise three packets of four cards that form the initially unseen part of a player's hand. This later variant has been described as a "very attractive" game for two which is both challenging and very exciting.

The only other two-handed Tarock game is the more complex Kosakeln or Kosaken ("Cossack"), which was introduced in the 1950s, but was more based on Illustrated Tarock than Tapp Tarock.

== Cards ==
Modern pack of Tarock cards by Piatnik of the type used for Kosakeln. This is the well known Industrie und Glück design, Type 6 by Josef Neumayer, 1890

The game is played with the usual Industrie und Glück card deck of 54 cards used for other Tarock games in Austria and other areas of the former Habsburg Empire (for more details, see Königrufen). This pack contains 22 tarocks as trumps and 32 cards in the four French suits. The card ranking is K Q C V 10 9 8 7 in the black suits and K Q C V 1 2 3 4 in the red suits. The cards are widely available online.

== Rules ==
The description of the rules largely follows that of Beck.

=== Tricks ===
Higher-value plain cards beat lower value plain cards in their own suit, tarocks beat suit cards and lower tarocks. Players must follow suit (Farbzwang), but there is no pressure to win the trick (no Stichzwang). If the lead suit cannot be followed, a Tarock must be played (Tarockzwang).

=== Dealing ===
The deck is cut to decide which of the two players deals first, then dealing alternates with each hand of cards. After shuffling and cutting, the dealer deals three packets of five cards each, beginning with forehand. The players then assess their cards. After assessing her hand, forehand has the right to decide first whether to "play" (Ich nehme auf) or to "pass" (Weiter or Ich passe). If she passes, this right passes to the dealer. If he passes as well, the cards are thrown in and a new hand dealt by the player who was forehand. Alternatively, they can agree to play regardless, but at a lower game value. Once a player has elected to "play", he or she becomes the declarer. The dealer then deals three packets of four cards to each player as talons, beginning with forehand again. These form the 'strawmen' (Strohmänner).

=== Strawmen ===
When the game begins and the strawmen have been placed, the top card of the first (left-hand) one is flipped. Tarocks and kings are set aside, face up, for the player in question, other suit cards remain face up as the top card of the strawman. The process of uncovering and setting aside is repeated for the other strawmen, from left to right. The last card of each strawman packet, regardless of its value, is added to the player's hand without being revealed. Then the cards set aside are also added to the respective players' hands after the process of uncovering is over and the opponent has viewed these cards.

The now face-up top cards of the strawmen form an extension of the player's hand and may either be discarded, played or used to take tricks at their owner's discretion. Then the next card is flipped, tarocks and kings are revealed and added to the hand of the respective player; other suit cards remain on the packet and, finally, the bottom cards are added to the player's hand without being revealed.

=== Playing and declaring ===
Forehand always plays to the first trick. Subsequently, the player who took the last trick leads, until all the cards are played.

If a player has the Trull in his hand (Tarock I, XXI, Sküs) or the Royal Trull (Königstrull, i.e. all four kings), under some rules (e.g. Beck) he can announce this when playing the first card of the Trull or Royal Trull and earn a bonus of one game point.

It is possible to use the Tarock I, the Pagat, and play it as the last card. This will (depending on whether it is tricked or not) win or lose one game point. Some rules allow other cards, such as the Tarock II, the Uhu, to score in a similar way (see "Scoring" below).

=== Card values and scoring ===
After the last trick is played, card points are added up using the usual Tarock scoring scheme whereby the basic card values are:

- 5 Points: Kings and Honours (I – Pagat, XXI – Mond, Sküs)
- 4 Points: Queens
- 3 Points: Knights or Cavaliers
- 2 Points: Jacks or Valets
- 1 Point: other tarocks and suit cards

Cards are grouped in threes; the score for each group is added up and 2 points deducted, e.g. King + Knight + XIII = 9 – 2 = 7 card points. If there are fewer than three cards remaining, 2/3 points must be deducted from each card. Any resulting fractions are rounded up or down.

=== Deciding the winner ===
To win the game the declarer needs 36 points (out of 70). If both players have 35 points (if necessary after rounding up or down), the game is considered a draw, only announcements are recorded or paid out for such a game (there is also a variant whereby in such a case the recorded game is considered lost for the declarer). In this case the next game counts double.

=== Scoring ===
Scoring systems vary and three examples are given below. Beck has a relatively austere scoring system. Bamberger (2011) follows Beck except that there is no point for winning after both pass, since his rule is that they throw the cards in and deal again. Mayr and Sedlaczek opt for a more extensive scoring system. Furr follows them, but omits the Quapil and adds the bonuses for major wins and for the Rostopschin.

Note that it is normal for bonuses for playing the 'birds' to their respective tricks go to the opponent if they fail to win. For example, if the Pagat is played to the last trick and lost, the winner of the trick gets the Pagat ultimo bonus.

Scoring in Strohmandeln
Contract or Bonus	Explanation	Beck (1972)	Furr (2009)	Mayr & Sedlaczek (2008)
Simple win (both passed)	Win after both players have passed	1	2	2
Simple win by declarer	Win by declarer with 36 to 44 points	2	3	3
Simple win by defender	Win by defender with 35 to 43 points	3	4	4
Major win by declarer	Win by declarer with 45 or more points	–	4	–
Major win by defender	Win by defender with 44 or more points	–	5	–
Trull or Royal Trull (hand)	Holding all 3 Trull cards or all four Kings in the hand.	1	–	–
Trull or Royal Trull (tricks)	Capturing all 3 Trull cards or all four Kings in tricks.	–	1	1
Pagat Ultimo	Winning the last trick with the Pagat (Tarock I).	1	1	1
Uhu	Winning the penultimate trick with the Uhu (Tarock II).	–	1	1
Kakadu	Winning the antepenultimate trick with the Kakadu ("Cockatoo", i.e. Tarock III).	–	1	1
Quapil	Winning the pre-anteprepenultimate trick with the Quapil (Tarock IV).	–	1	1
Rostopschin	Taking successive tricks with VII and VIII, announcing “Ros” and “Topschin” respectively on playing the card	–	1	–
Valat	Taking every trick	–	12	12

==== Further scoring options ====
- 1 game point: for a Mondfang, i.e. for the player who captures the Mond with the Sküs

== Other games with straw men ==
- Officers' Skat. This two-hand, card game of the Skat family also employs the method of playing from stacks of cards with the top one flipped. However, it uses a normal 32-card German- or French-suited card deck, and all the cards are placed on the table; there are no hand cards.
- Officers' Schafkopf. This is a two-hander of the Schafkopf family which is played in a very similar way to Officers Skat.
- French Tarot. A two-hand variant of French Tarot called La Découverte uses six straw men per player with two cards in each stack, the upper one being faced before play starts. The upcards may only be played and not taken into the hand.

== Literature ==
- _ (1800). Neuestes Spielbuch. Johann Georg Edlen von Mößler, Vienna.
- _ (1829). Neuestes Allgemeines Spielbuch. C. Haas, Vienna.
- _ (1839). Neuestes Spielbuch, 2nd revised and expanded edition. C. Haas, Vienna.
- Bamberger, Johannes (2011), Tarock: Die schönsten Varianten. 22nd edn. Perlen-Reihe 640. Vienna: Perlen-Reihe.
- Beck, Fritz (1972). Tarock komplett. Alle Spiele, Perlen-Reihe No. 640, Vienna.
- Dummett, Michael (1980). The Game of Tarot. Duckworth, London. ISBN 0 7156 1014 7
- Furr, Jerry Neill (2009). "Straw Man Tarock" in Tarocchi: An introduction to the many games played with tarot cards. Philebus.
- Löw, Hans (1956). Tarock komplett, 2nd edn. Pechan; Vienna.
- Mayr, Wolfgang and Robert Sedlaczek (2008). Die Strategie des Tarock Spiels, Atelier, Vienna. ISBN 978-3-902498-22-9
- Ulmann, S. (1890). Das Buch der Familienspiele. A. Hartleben, Vienna, Munich and Pest.
