= Mond =

Mond may refer to:

== Science and industry ==
- MOND (Modified Newtonian dynamics), a proposed adjustment to the classical inverse-square law of gravity
- Mond gas, a cheap form of coal gas
- Mond Nickel Company, a defunct mining company
- Brunner Mond, a chemicals company
- Der Mond, a 1837 description of the Moon by Johann Heinrich von Mädler and Wilhelm Beer

== Other ==
- Mond (playing card), a trump card in Tarock games
- Mond (surname)
- Mond River, a river in Iran
- Der Mond (1939), a one-act opera by Carl Orff

== See also ==
- Mond Mond Mond , a German television series
