= Monds =

Monds is a surname. Notable people with the surname include:

- Fabian Monds (born 1940), public servant
- John Monds (born 1965), candidate for office
- Mario Monds (born 1976), American football player
- Wonder Monds (born 1952), American football player

== See also ==
- Mond (disambiguation)
