= Mond (surname) =

Mond is a surname. Notable people with the surname include:

- Alfred Mond, 1st Baron Melchett (1868-1930), British industrialist
- Bernard Mond (1887-1957), Polish general
- Chava Mond (born 1984), Israeli model
- Emile Mond (1865-1938), German businessman
- Frida Mond (1847-1923), German arts patron
- Henry Mond, 2nd Baron Melchett (1898-1949), British politician
- Jang Mond (born 1952), former Luxembourger professional footballer
- Josh Mond (born c. 1983), American film director and producer
- Julian Edward Alfred Mond, 3rd Baron Melchett (1925-1973), English industrialist
- Julie Mond, American actress
- Kellen Mond (born 1999), American football player
- Ludwig Mond (1839-1909), German chemist
- Peter Mond, 4th Baron Melchett (born 1948-2018), British politician
- Philip Mond, film director and cinematographer
- Robert Mond (1867-1938), British chemist and archaeologist
- Robert Mond (footballer) (1927-1985), Luxembourger professional footballer
- Steven Mond (born 1971), Canadian former child actor
- Violet Mond, Baroness Melchett (1867-1945), English humanitarian
