= Tapp Tarock =

Tarot card game

- A trick-taking game of the Tarot game family.
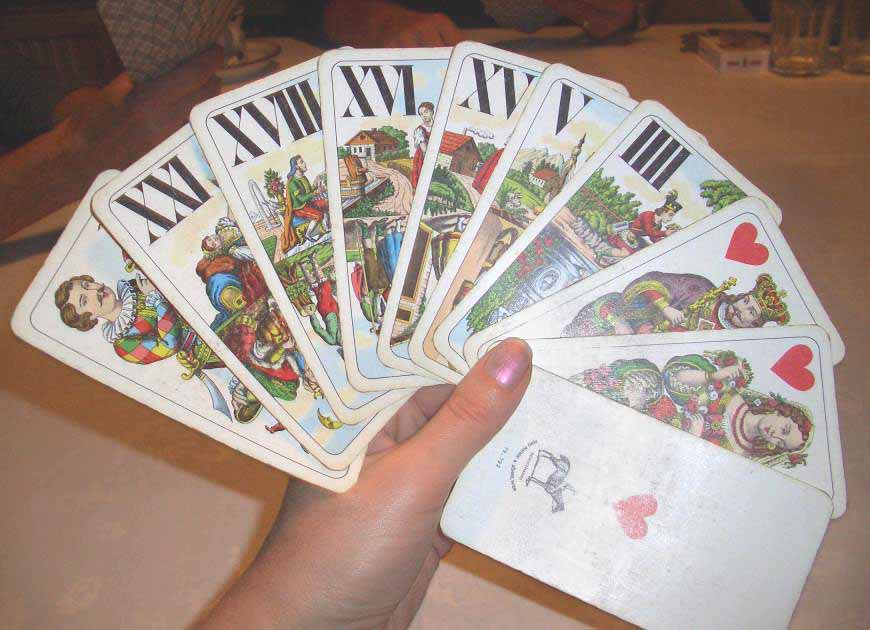
- Origin: Austria
- Type: Trick-taking
- Players: 3
- Skills: Tactics, Strategy
- Cards: 54
- Deck: Tarot; traditionally, Industrie und Glück
- Rank (high→low): Trumps: Sküs, XXI-I ♣♠ K Q C J 10 9 8 7 ♥♦ K Q C J 1 2 3 4
- Play: Anti-clockwise
- Playing time: 20 min/deal
- Chance: Moderate

Related games
- Dreierles • Dreiertarock • Illustrated Tarock • Point Tarock

Tapp Tarock (German: Tapp-Tarock), also called Viennese Tappen (German: Wiener Tappen), Tappen or Tapper, is a three-player tarot card game which traditionally uses the 54-card Industrie und Glück deck. Before the Anschluss (1938), it was the preferred card game of Viennese coffee houses, for example, the Literatencafés and Café Central. Even today Tapp Tarock is played sporadically. The exact date when it appeared is not possible to identify; some sources suggest it may have been developed in Austria in the early 19th century, but its mention in caricature operas in 1806 suggest it was well known even by then and must have arisen in the late 18th century. The oldest description of the actual rules is dated to 1821. Tapp Tarock is considered a good entry level game before players attempt more complex Tarock forms like Cego, Illustrated Tarock or Königrufen.

== Name ==
Tapp is the name of the face-down stack of cards in the middle of the table – in other games known as the talon or stock. The names of other card games are also derived from it, including Tappu or Tappä for the Swiss Tarock variant of Troggu, as well as the Austrian Stubaital valley game of Dobbm and the south German game of Tapp which was an attempt to play Tapp Tarock with ordinary cards.

Other names for Tapp Tarock were Taroc(k)-Tapp(en), Taroc(k)tappen or just Tappen or Tapper. An older name or name of a predecessor game was Pagatjagen; a 42-card variant was Zwölfertarock and a variant with 40 cards was Einfaches Tarock. Because the announcement "ich tappe" ("I'll tapp") referred to the lowest level of the game which was soon dropped, it became fashionable to name the game after the next highest level, Dreiern, Dreierl or Dreierles, names which are prevalent to this day in Baden-Württemberg. In the late 19th century the name Zeco was also used. That suggests a link with Cego, which refers to the Blind, as the talon is known in that game. Tapp, also called Württemberg Tarock, is a south German game that is not a member of the true Tarock family but may have originated as an attempt to play a form of three-handed Tarock with a standard 36-card, German-suited pack.

== History ==
Tapp Tarock is recorded, as Tarocktappen, as early as 1806 in a comic opera written by the Viennese poet and playwright Joachim Perinet, Die neue Alzeste and in an anthology of letters (also as Taroktappen), both published in Vienna. It is also mentioned in another comic opera by Karl Meisl, Amor und Psyche, published in Pest (now Budapest) in 1820, where the character Jupiter refers to Tarocktappen.

The first description of its rules, however, appears in Theoretisch-praktische Anweisung zur gründlichen Erlernung des beliebten Tarok-Tappen Spiels, published in Vienna in 1821.

Tapp Tarock is probably the oldest tarock variant in which five basic features of tarock are found together:

- the shortening of the 78-card tarot deck to the current 54 cards
- the conversion from Italian suits to French suits
- the addition of bidding
- the conversion of The Fool or Sküs (Excuse) to simply being the 22nd and highest trump
- the bonus of winning the final trick with trump 1 (Pagat Ultimo)

The conversion of the Sküs was completed, according to the tarot expert Michael Dummett, in Austria. In Troggu, the older Swiss tarot game, the Fool can function as the highest trump or as the excuse. The introduction of the Pagat Ultimo, according to card game historian John McLeod, is believed to have come from the ancient Italian game of Trappola.

The original 1821 rules only had 3 positive bids: Tapper, Dreier and Solo. Tapper was the lowest bid – announced by saying "I'll tap" (ich tappe) or just tapping on the table – and originally entitled the declarer to exchange with all six cards of the talon and count the discards to his total at the end. By the time the rules had been printed, a Tapper was usually not played out; the declarer simply received the game points for it and the deal passed to the next player in turn. However, a 1920 source suggests that the Tapper bid may have lingered on into the early 20th century, although by then "it was hardly ever played".

By 1838, Tapp Tarock had become sufficiently popular in south Germany that Tap-Taroc packs were being advertised by C. Diehl of Darmstadt. Likewise in 1872, Tap-Tarock cards were being sold in Karlsruhe alongside Tarock, Whist and Piquet packs. Dummett believed that the game continued to be played in Germany until the end of the 19th century and certainly in continued to be recorded in German and Austria compendia throughout the 19th and 20th centuries. After the Second World War, more complicated variants such as Illustrated Tarock were developed and, today, Dreiertarock is its tournament equivalent.

Tapp Tarock may have experienced a brief vogue in Switzerland for, by 1841, 54-card packs for Tap-Taroc were being produced by F.G. Halbmeyer of Aarau, alongside 78-card packs for Gross Taroc.

== Cards ==
The game is played with the 54-card Industrie und Glück Tarot pack. This includes 22 trumps numbered with Roman numerals except for the highest trump, the Sküs (Fool). (Note: Sküs is a corruption of Excuse, the French name for this card.) The second highest trump, the XXI, is called the Mond, while the lowest trump I, is the Pagat. The Sküs, Mond, and Pagat are together known as the Trull or honours and are worth 5 points each. The other trumps are worth 1 point each.

Each of the four plain suits comprises four courts – king, queen, cavalier and jack – and four pip cards. They rank as follows:

- Black suits: K > Q > C > J > 10 > 9 > 8 > 7
- Red suits: K > Q > C > J > 1 > 2 > 3 > 4

The kings are worth 5 points, queens 4, knights 3, jacks 2, and pip cards 1.

== Rules ==
The following rules for modern Tapp Tarock are based on Mayr and Sedlaczek (2001):

=== Preliminaries ===
Seating and first dealer may be determined by lot. Deal and play are anticlockwise.

=== Dealing ===
The dealer shuffles and offers the cards to the left for cutting. After the cut, the dealer places the top six cards face down on the table in two crosswise packets of three; this is the talon. Next, the dealer distributes 16 cards to each player, anticlockwise, in packets of four and beginning with forehand (to the right). If the cutter 'knocks', the dealer deals each player sixteen cards in one packet.

=== Bidding ===
Forehand opens the bidding which rotates anticlockwise. There are four legal positive bids which, in ascending order, are:

- Dreier ("Three-er")
- Unterer ("Lower")
- Oberer ("Upper")
- Solo.

Forehand announces "pass" (ich passe) or "Dreier!" (ich spiele einen Dreier). (Note: Passing is known as tappen after the lowest bid in the original game.) If forehand passes, subsequent players have the same options. Once a Dreier is bid, a later player must pass or overcall with the next higher bid, except that "Solo" may be bid at the first opportunity when it is a player's turn. A player whose has been overcalled may, when the turn rotates around again, may "hold" (halte ich) it, i.e. announce an intention to take over the higher contract from the later bidder. A player who has passed may not re-enter the bidding. The highest bidder becomes the declarer, noting that, if the highest bid was held, the holder is the declarer. (Note: The modern bidding procedure is a multi-round one with 'delayed hold', in which bidding and holding rotate in strict order. Originally, bidding was a single round process with 'immediate hold'.)

In a Dreier, Unterer and Oberer, the declarer exposes both talon halves and may pick up either half before discarding three cards; these count to the declarer at the end. The discards may not include kings or Trull cards. Tarocks may only be discarded if the declarer has no option; in which case they must be shown to the defenders. The unused half of the talon is set aside, face down, and counts towards the defenders score at the end. (Note: Parlett (2008) notes that the terms Dreier, Unterer and Oberer originally denoted which half of the talon the declarer could use: in a Dreier he could choose either; in an Unterer he had to take the lower three cards and in an Oberer he had to pick up the upper three cards. In the last two cases, the unused talon half went to the defenders, unseen until play ended. This is verified by Unger (1923). who goes on to state that "in some circles" the modern procedure is used. Today there is no difference in the procedure - the declarer may choose either packet - however, the game value is different in each case. Dummett (1980) notes that the older procedure was listed in the Piatnik leaflet on the rules of the game, but that it differed from the other descriptions he had come across. Alscher (2003) includes it as a variation which may be used to make the Unterer and Oberer contracts more difficult. Bernhard Krüpl also records this variant.)

In a Solo, the declarer plays without the aid of the talon, which is set aside and counts towards to the defenders at the end.

The game values of the different contracts are given below.

=== Announcements ===
The declarer may make either of two announcements before play begins. These increase risk because the defenders gain information, but they score bonus points if the declarer succeeds. The possible announcements are:

- Pagat Ultimo. The declarer undertakes to win the last trick with the Pagat (Trump I). Value: 8 points.
- Valat. The declarer undertakes to win every trick. Value: 24 points.

=== Play ===
Play is anticlockwise starting with forehand. Players must follow suit if able; otherwise must play a trump. Lacking both, the player may discard any card.

=== Scoring ===
==== Card points ====
The normal Tarock scoring scheme is used i.e. the cards taken in tricks (including any talon cards) are grouped in packets of three. If one or two are left over they should be low cards (Blatt) i.e. ie. pip cards or ordinary (non-Trull) Tarocks and are worth 1/3 point each. Each packet is scored and 2 card points deducted. The packet totals are added together to give the player(s) overall score. The declarer must score at least 35 2/3 = 36 points (rounded up) to win the game.

The Pagat Ultimo bonus is awarded as per the table to whoever takes it if it is played to the last trick. An announced Pagat Ultimo is only won if achieved; if the declarer loses it at any point, the defenders each score the bonus.

==== Game values and bonuses ====
The game values and bonus points are as follows:

Game values and bonuses in Tapp Tarock
| Contracts | Points | Bonus types | Meaning | Unannounced | Announced |
| Dreier | 3 | Köpfe ("heads") | Two honours (Note: The 'honours' are the Sküs, Pagat and Tarock 21.) in one's opening hand | 1 | – |
| Unterer | 4 | Tarock Trull | All 3 honours in one's opening hand | 3 | – |
| Oberer | 5 | Royal Trull | All four Kings in one's opening hand | 3 | – |
| Solo | 8 | Pagat Ultimo | Winning the last trick with the Pagat | 4 | 8 |
| Valat | 12 | Pagat Ultimo in Solo | ditto in a Solo contract | 8 | 16 |
| Valat announced | 24 | – | – | – | – |

The game value or bonus is paid by each defender to the declarer if the latter won it. Otherwise the declarer pays it to each defender.

== Related games ==
There are many variants which are developments or elaborations of Tapp Tarock, the most common today being Dreiertarock and Illustrated Tarock which have more complex rules in bidding and contracts.

== Bibliography ==
- _ (1821), Theoretisch-praktische Anweisung zur gründlichen Erlernung des beliebten des Tarok-Tappen Spiels, Carl Haas, Vienna and Prague.
- Meisl, Karl (1820). Amor und Psyche. A mythological caricature in 2 acts (music by Ferdinand Kauer), Pest.
- Alscher, Hans-Joachim (2003). "Tapp-Tarock" in Tarock: mein einziges Vergnügen ed. by Alscher. Obersteirische Druck- und Verlagsges., Leoben. ISBN 978-38546-0209-5
- Cato, Otto (c. 1920). Tarok, Whist, Bridge und andere Kartenspiele. Part 2. Ravensburg: Otto Maier.
- Dummett, Michael (1980). The Game of Tarot. London: Duckworths. ISBN 0-7156-1014-7.
- Furr, Jerry Neill. "Illustrated Tapp" in Tarocchi: An introduction to the many games played with tarot cards. Philebus (2009).
- Kastner, Hugo and Gerald Kador Folkvord. Die große Humboldt-Enzyklopädie der Kartenspiele. Baden-Baden: Humboldt (2005). ISBN 978-3-89994-058-9
- Mayr, Wolfgang and Robert Sedlaczek. Das Große Tarock-Buch. Vienna: Zsolnay (2001). ISBN 3-85223-462-X
- Parlett, David (2008). The Penguin book of card games. London: Penguin. ISBN 978-0-141-03787-5.
- Perinet, Joachim (1806). Die neue Alzeste, a caricature opera in knittel (doggerel) rhyme, in three parts. Wallishausser, Vienna.
- Richter, Joseph I. (1806). Briefe eines Eipeldauers an seinen Herrn Vetter in Kakran, Second Letter, Volume 7, Rehm'schen Buchhandlung, Vienna, p.19.
- Ulmann, S (1887). Illustrirtes Wiener Tarockbuch. Vienna, Pest, Leipzig: Hartleben.
- Unger, Franz (1923). Kleines Lehrbuch des Tarockspiels. Vienna: Piatnik.
