= Jang Mond =

Luxembourgish footballer (born 1952)

Personal information
- Full name: Léon Mond
- Date of birth: 13 December 1952 (age 73)
- Position: Defender

Senior career*
Years	Team	Apps	(Gls)
1973–1984	Jeunesse Esch		
1984–1989	Avenir Beggen		

International career
1976–1979	Luxembourg	7	(0)
- * Club domestic league appearances and goals

Jang Mond (born 13 December 1952) is a retired Luxembourgish football defender.
