= Fritz von Herzmanovsky-Orlando =

Austrian writer and illustrator (1877-1954)

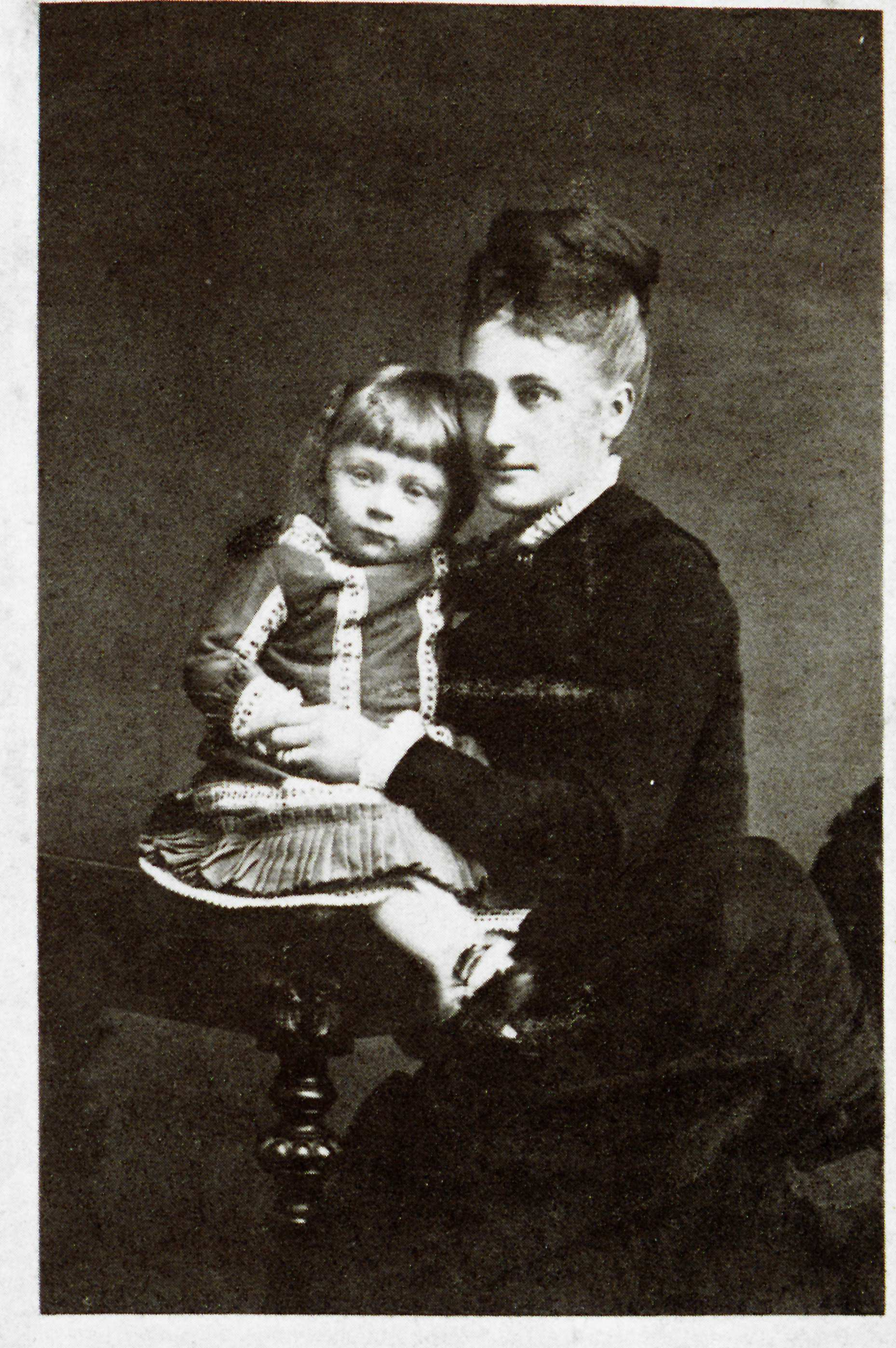
Josef Löwy: Aloisia von Orlando and son, Friedrich (1880)

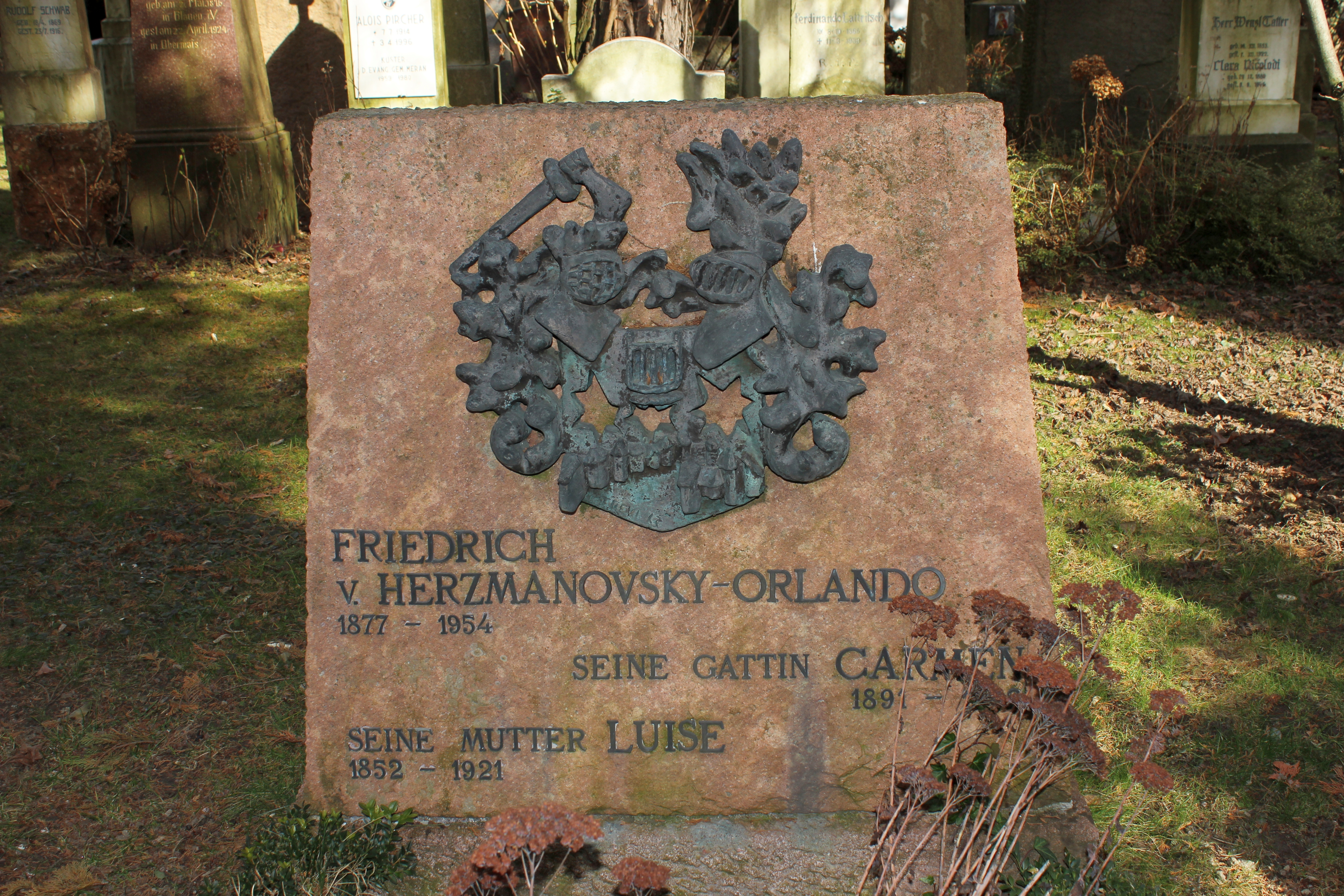
Gravestone of the Herzmanovsky-Orlando family in Meran

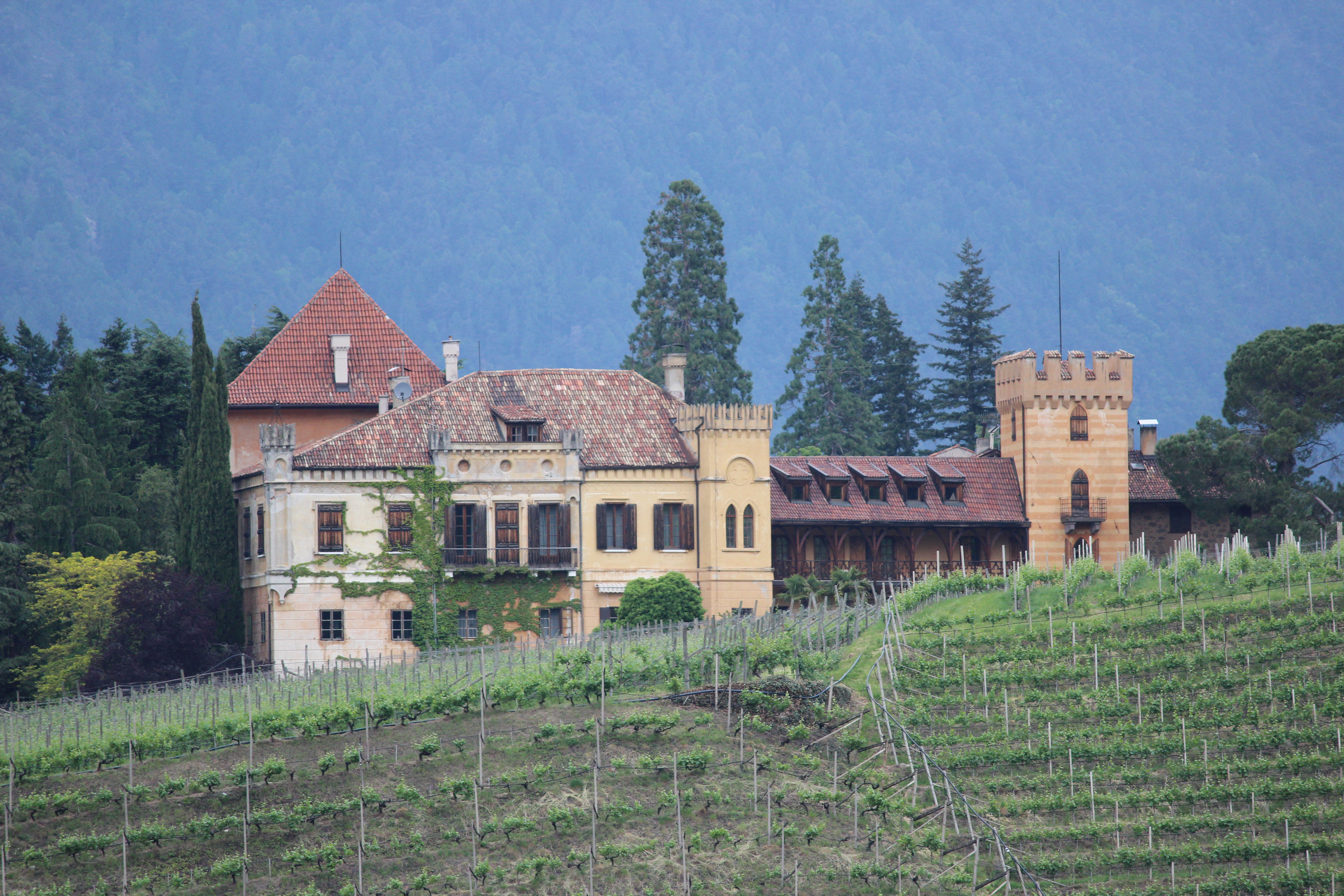
Schloss Rametz

Fritz von Herzmanovsky-Orlando (1877–1954) was an Austrian writer and illustrator.

== Life ==
Herzmanovsky-Orlando was born on 30 April 1877 as Friedrich Josef Franz Ritter von Herzmanowsky (Baron Herzmanowsky) in Vienna, Austria-Hungary. He was the son of Emil Josef Ritter von Herzmanowsky, an Imperial and Royal official in the Ministry of Agriculture who came from Tarnów, and his wife, Aloisia von Orlando who had been born in Kosmonosy. He attended the private Theresianum school in Vienna before completing, in 1896–1903, a construction engineering degree at the Vienna University of Technology. Within the next year and a half he got to know his subsequent lifelong friend, Alfred Kubin, and in Munich associated with Cosmic Circle, a group of writers and intellectuals that included Karl Wolfskehl, Ludwig Klages and Alfred Schuler. In 1904/05, Herzmanovsky-Orlando worked as an employee and later as an independent architect. In 1911/12, he gave his career up due to chronically painful kidney tuberculosis. On 25 February 1911, he married Carmen Maria Schulista in Vienna. Because he was financially independent, he lived from then on as a privatier in art, drawing, collecting, restoring and writing. His disease led to several spa breaks and trips to the south. Among other things, he went with his wife in 1913 to the northeastern Adriatic, in 1914 to Egypt, Sicily and southern Italy for over four months. In 1916, due to illness, he moved to Meran which was Austrian until 1918, now Merano in Italy.

From the beginning of 1918, with official permission, he also bore his maternal surname. His mother's family came from the Swiss uradel, his grandfather Friedrich von Orlando was the lord of the manor (Rittergutsbesitzer) in Kleindehsa in the German Empire. Herzmanovsky-Orlando falsified his family tree to claim ancestry even before the Crusades. In 1932, he became a member of the NSDAP/AO, foreign branch of the Nazi party.

Having become a German citizen as a result of the Anschluss of Austria to the German Reich in 1938, Herzmanovsky-Orlando was forced to leave South Tyrol in 1940 under the South Tyrol Option Agreement. Since he could not live north of the Alps due to illness, he moved to Malcesine on Lake Garda. He did not return to Merano until 1949. He spent the last years of his life in the nearby Schloss Rametz, where he died of uremia on 17 May 1954.

Herzmanovsky spent many summers in his villa in Ebensee-Rindbach, his family's holiday home. Here he received several guests, including the journalist Anni Hartmann and Hedi Juer, his half-sister who lives in Australia.

In 1970, Herzmanovsky-Orlando-Gasse in Vienna – Floridsdorf (21st District) was named after him.

== Work ==
Fritz von Herzmanovsky-Orlando was able to publish very little during his lifetime. Many of his works are only available in sketch form. His extensive literary work, which consists mainly of prose and plays, only became known posthumously through the collected works published by Friedrich Torberg.

As an editor, however, Torberg made significant changes to Herzmanovsky-Orlando's texts, which led to severe criticism from literary studies. For example, in Masquerade of Geniuses (Maskenspiel der Genien), Torberg changed the name of the "Empire of Tarock" completely arbitrarily from Tarockia (Tarockei) to Tarockania (Tarockanien), obviously based on the term Kakania (Kakanien) in Robert Musil's Man Without Qualities. Herzmanovsky-Orlando envisaged a certain harmony with Turkey or the earlier Byzantium. Only the second collected works, published by Germanists two decades later, gave a faithful rendering of the original text.

In his works, Herzmanovsky-Orlando fantasized about a mystical dreamland called "Tarockia" (Tarockei), which he portrayed in an extravagant, baroque style that bordered on the parodistic. He had Italian humanist, Cyriaco de' Pizzicolli, appear as the main character of his grotesquely fantastic novel, Masquerade of Geniuses.

In addition to contacts with the Munich Cosmic Circle and other, equally irrational-esoteric groups, he became involved in the esoteric and mystic, including the right-wing esoteric ideas of Jörg Lanz von Liebenfels and pseudoscience. Fritz von Herzmanovsky-Orlando was a member of the New Temple Order founded by Jörg Lanz von Liebenfels. An example of his esoteric orientation is his "discovery" that the legendary "saline women" in Tyrol, who also appear in his Tyrolean Dragon Play (Tiroler Drachenspiel), were actually yoga girls who at certain points, the so-called "earth navels" (Erdnabel), could cause gene mutations by dancing.

His only known work as an architect is the house at Wehrgasse 22 in Vienna – Margareten, which he built in 1910 together with Fritz Keller.

== Works ==
=== Novels (Austrian Trilogy) ===
- Der Gaulschreck im Rosennetz. Eine Wiener Schnurre aus dem modernden Barock (The Gaulschreck in the Rose Net. A Viennese Anecdote of the Modern Baroque Period)
- Rout am fliegenden Holländer (Route of the Flying Dutchman)
- Das Maskenspiel der Genien (Masquerade of the Genii)

=== Plays ===
- Die Fürstin von Cythera. (The Princess of Cythera) "A Venetian Masked Comedy by F. von Orlando."
- Kaiser Joseph und die Bahnwärterstochter (Emperor Joseph II and the Stationmaster's Daughter.) "A dramatic voice from Inner Austria brought to life by Friedrich von Orlando, Baron and Lord in Krain and on the Windic March, patrician of Trieste and Fiume etc. Reverently dedicated by the same to the same."
- ’s Wiesenhendl oder Der abgelehnte Drilling. ( Münchner Komödie in drei Aufzügen von Fritz von Orlando
- Prinz Hamlet der Osterhase oder "Selawie" oder Baby Wallenstein. (Prince Hamlet the Easter Bunny or "Cellavie" or Baby Wallenstein). "A social comedy from the finest circles of Bohemia and Moravia by Friedrich von Orlando."
- Die Krone von Byzanz. (The Crown of Byzantium). "A mystery from the Rococo Period of the Levant."
- Exzellenzen ausstopfen – ein Unfug. (Stuffing Your Excellencies – A Horseplay.) "A scandalous incident from old Vienna (prologue and 11 sung scenes) by Friedrich von Orlando."
- Das Tyroler Drachenspiel (The Tyrolean Dragon Play). Fragment.

=== Audio drama ===
- Der verirrte böse Hund (The Wicked Stray Dog).

=== Ballets and pantomimes ===
- Der Zaubergarten oder Zweimal tot und lebendig. (The Magic Garden or Twice Dead and Alive). A Salzburg ballet "for people with strong nerves."
- Die Fahrt ins Traumland. (A Trip into the Land of Dreams). Surrealistic ballet.
- Youghiogheny. A pantomime. Overture and one act.
- Diana and Endymion. Viennese ballet in three acts.
- Der Raub der Europa. (The Rape of Europe). Pantomime in three acts.
- Abduhenendas mißratene Töchter. (Abduction of the Wayward Daughters) "Grotesque, danced, spoken and sun in four acts."
- Das Bajaderenopfer (The Bayadere Sacrifice) Ballet.

=== Stories ===
- Cavaliere Huscher oder von Ybs verhängnisvolle Meerfahrt. Eine Erzählung
- Dem Andenken der großen Naiven Stella Hohenfels
- Don Carlos. Ein Erlebnis
- Kleine Geschichten um Gustav Meyrink
- Beethovens letzte Magd. Eine historische Reminiszenz
- Onkel Tonis verpatzter Heiliger Abend
- Onkel Toni und Nietzsche
- Onkel Toni und die Klystierspritze
- Das Unheil breitet seine Fittiche über die Familie Watzka aus
- Das Unglück mit den Wanzen
- Das Familienbild
- Das jüngste Gericht
- Pater Kniakals erbauliche Predigt
- Der Mann mit den drei Schuhen
- Gibt es Wassertrompeter?
- Der konfuse Brief
- Der Zwerg im Nebel
- Der Kommandant von Kalymnos. Ein Mysterium aus dem Rokoko der Levante
- Apoll von Nichts. Novelle
- Apoll von Nichts. Skurrile Erzählung von Fritz von Herzmanovsky-Orlando (Meran)
- Der verirrte böse Hund. Erzählung

Sketches, fragments and letters.

=== Books ===
- Der Kommandant von Kalymnos. Vienna, 1926
- Der Gaulschreck im Rosennetz. A. Wolf Verlag, Vienna, 1928
- Der letzte Hofzwerg. Vienna, 1928
- Gesammelte Werke. (ed. and revised by Friedrich Torberg), Langen-Müller Verlag, Munich
  - Vol. 1. Der Gaulschreck im Rosennetz. 1957
  - Vol. 2. Maskenspiel der Genien. 1958
  - Vol. 3. Lustspiele und Ballette. 1960
  - Vol. 4. Cavaliere Huscher und andere Erzählungen. 1963
- Tarockanische Miniaturen. Graz etc. 1964
- Zeichnungen. Salzburg 1965
- Zerbinettas Befreiung. Frankfurt am Main 1965
- Tarockanische Geheimnisse. Vienna 1974
- Das Gesamtwerk. Munich etc. 1975
- Kaiser Joseph und die Bahnwärterstochter. Frankfurt 1975
- 's Wiesenhendl oder Der abgelehnte Drilling. Köln 1975
- Prinz Hamlet der Osterhase oder „Selawie" oder Baby Wallenstein. Köln 1975
- Perle und Tarockanien. Munich 1980 (with Alfred Kubin)
- Sämtliche Werke. Salzburg etc.
  - Vol. 1. Österreichische Trilogie, 1. Der Gaulschreck im Rosennetz. (ed. and comments by Susanna Kirschl-Goldberg), Residenz Verlag, Salzburg-Vienna 1983 ISBN 3-7017-0350-7
  - Vol. 2. Österreichische Trilogie, 2. Rout am fliegenden Holländer. (ed. and comments by Susanna Kirschl-Goldberg), Residenz Verlag, Salzburg-Vienna 1984 ISBN 3-7017-0364-7
  - Vol. 3. Österreichische Trilogie, 3. Das Maskenspiel der Genien. (ed. and comments by Susanna Goldberg), Residenz Verlag, Salzburg-Vienna 1989 ISBN 3-7017-0582-8
  - Vol. 4. Erzählungen, Pantomimen und Ballette(ed. and comments by Klaralinda Ma-Kircher and Wendelin Schmidt-Dengler), Residenz Verlag, Salzburg-Vienna 1991 ISBN 3-7017-0668-9
  - Vol. 5. Zwischen Prosa und Drama. (ed. and comments by Susanna Kirschl-Goldberg), Residenz Verlag, Salzburg-Vienna 1986 ISBN 3-7017-0439-2
  - Vol. 6. Dramen. (ed. and comments by Klaralinda Kircher), Residenz Verlag, Salzburg-Vienna 1985 ISBN 3-7017-0389-2
  - Vol. 7. Der Briefwechsel mit Alfred Kubin 1903 bis 1952. (ed. and comments by Michael Klein), Residenz Verlag, Salzburg-Vienna 1983 ISBN 3-7017-0351-5
  - Vol. 8. Ausgewählte Briefwechsel 1885 bis 1954. (ed. and comments by Max Reinisch), Residenz Verlag, Salzburg-Vienna 1989 ISBN 3-7017-0542-9
  - Vol. 9. Skizzen und Fragmente. (ed. and comments by Klaralinda Ma-Kircher), Residenz Verlag, Salzburg-Vienna 1992 ISBN 3-7017-0673-5
  - Vol. 10. Sinfonietta Canzonetta Austriaca. (ed. und komm. von Susanna Goldberg), Residenz Verlag, Salzburg-Vienna 1994 ISBN 3-7017-0674-3
- Im Garten der Erkenntnis. Salzburg etc. 1988
- Das Beste von Herzmanovsky-Orlando. Vienna 1995
- Das grafische Werk. Krems (1987–1997)
  - Vol. 1. 1893–1899.
  - Vol. 2. 1900–1917.
  - Vol. 3. Druckgrafik.
  - Vol. 4. 1918–1920 Zeichnungen.
  - Vol. 5. 1918–1920 Skizzen.
  - Vol. 6. 1921–1954.
  - Vol. 7. Zur eigenen Literatur.
  - Vol. 8. Entwürfe, Scherenschnitte, Exlibris.
- Sämtliche Werke in drei Büchern bei Zweitausendeins, Zweitausendeins, Frankfurt am Main 1997? ISBN 3-86150-190-2 (Lizenzausgabe der Sämtlichen Werke, Residenz Verlag, 1983ff)
  - Book 1: Band I (Der Gaulschreck im Rosennetz), Band II: Rout am Fliegenden Holländer, Band III: Das Maskenspiel der Genien, Band IV: Erzählungen, Pantomimen und Ballette
  - Book 2: Band V: Zwischen Prosa und Drama, Band VI: Dramen, Band IX: Skizzen und Fragmente
  - Book 3: Band X: Sinfonietta Canzonetta Austriaca
- Gaulschreck, Hofzwerg, Exzellenzen. Munich 2001
- Der Gaulschreck im Rosennetz. (ed. by Susanna Goldberg), Residenz Verlag, Salzburg-Vienna 2004, ISBN 3-7017-1381-2
- Scoglio Pomo oder Rout am Fliegenden Holländer. (ed. by Klaralinda Ma-Kircher), Residenz Verlag, St. Pölten-Salzburg 2007, ISBN 978-3-7017-1469-8
- Prosa – Erzählungen und Skizzen. (ed. by Klaralinda Ma-Kircher), Residenz Verlag, St. Pölten-Salzburg 2008, ISBN 978-3-7017-1502-2
- Das Maskenspiel der Genien. (ed. by Klaralinda Ma-Kircher), Residenz Verlag, St. Pölten-Salzburg 2010, ISBN 978-3-7017-1552-7
- Der Gaulschreck im Rosennetz. (ed. by Klaralinda Ma-Kircher), Residenz Verlag, St. Pölten-Salzburg-Vienna 2013, ISBN 978-3-7017-1609-8
- Ausgewählte Werke. (ed. by Klaradlinda Ma-Kircher), Residenz Verlag, St. Pölten 2013, ISBN 978-3-7017-1619-7

== Literature ==
- Fritz von Herzmanovsky-Orlando. Linz 1969.
- Herzmanovsky-Orlando. Vienna 1970.
- Friedrich Bohne (ed.): Fritz von Herzmanovsky-Orlando. Nuremberg 1961.
- Barbara Bronnen: Fritz von Herzmanovsky-Orlando. Munich 1965
- Tino Erben (ed.): Fritz von Herzmanovsky-Orlando. Vienna 1977.
- Bernhard Fetz, Klaralinda Ma, Wendelin Schmidt-Dengler (ed.): Phantastik auf Abwegen. Fritz von Herzmanovsky-Orlando im Kontext. Vienna 2004.
- Monika von Gagern: Ideologie und Phantasmagorie Fritz von Herzmanovsky-Orlandos. Munich 1972.
- Gregor Gatscher-Riedl: "Die Perchtoldsdorfer "Theresienau" und Fritz von Herzmanovsky-Orlando. Zum 90-jährigen Jubiläum von "Der Gaulschreck im Rosennetz"." In: Heimatkundliche Beilage [zum Amtsblatt der Bezirkshauptmannschaft Mödling], 53rd year, F. 3, (Mödling 5 September 2018), pp. 21f.
- Barbara Grunert-Bronnen (1969). "Herzmanovsky-Orlando, Fritz von". Neue Deutsche Biographie (in German). Vol. 8. Berlin: Duncker & Humblot. p. 738. (full text online).
- Arnulf Meifert, Manfred Kopriva (ed.): Forscher im Zwischenreich. Der Zeichner Fritz von Herzmanovsky-Orlando. St. Pölten-Salzburg-Vienna 2012, ISBN 978-3-7017327-3-9.
- Inge Podbrecky: "Das Katzenhaus. Eine neu entdeckte Arbeit von Fritz von Herzmanovsky-Orlando?" In: Österreichische Zeitschrift für Kunst und Denkmalpflege. LXIII, Issue 3–4, 2009, pp. 301–305.
- Astrid Wallner: Allotria in artibus. Vienna 1990.
- Gabriele Van Zon: Word and picture. New York [and others] 1991.
- Ingold Zeisberger: Fritz von Herzmanovsky-Orlandos „Gaulschreck im Rosennetz“. Aspekte der frühen Moderne in der „Österreichischen Trilogie“. Saarbrücken 2011.
