= Trull (cards) =

Set of three cards in tarot games

The Trull from an Austrian Tarock Type C pack: Pagat, Mond, Sküs

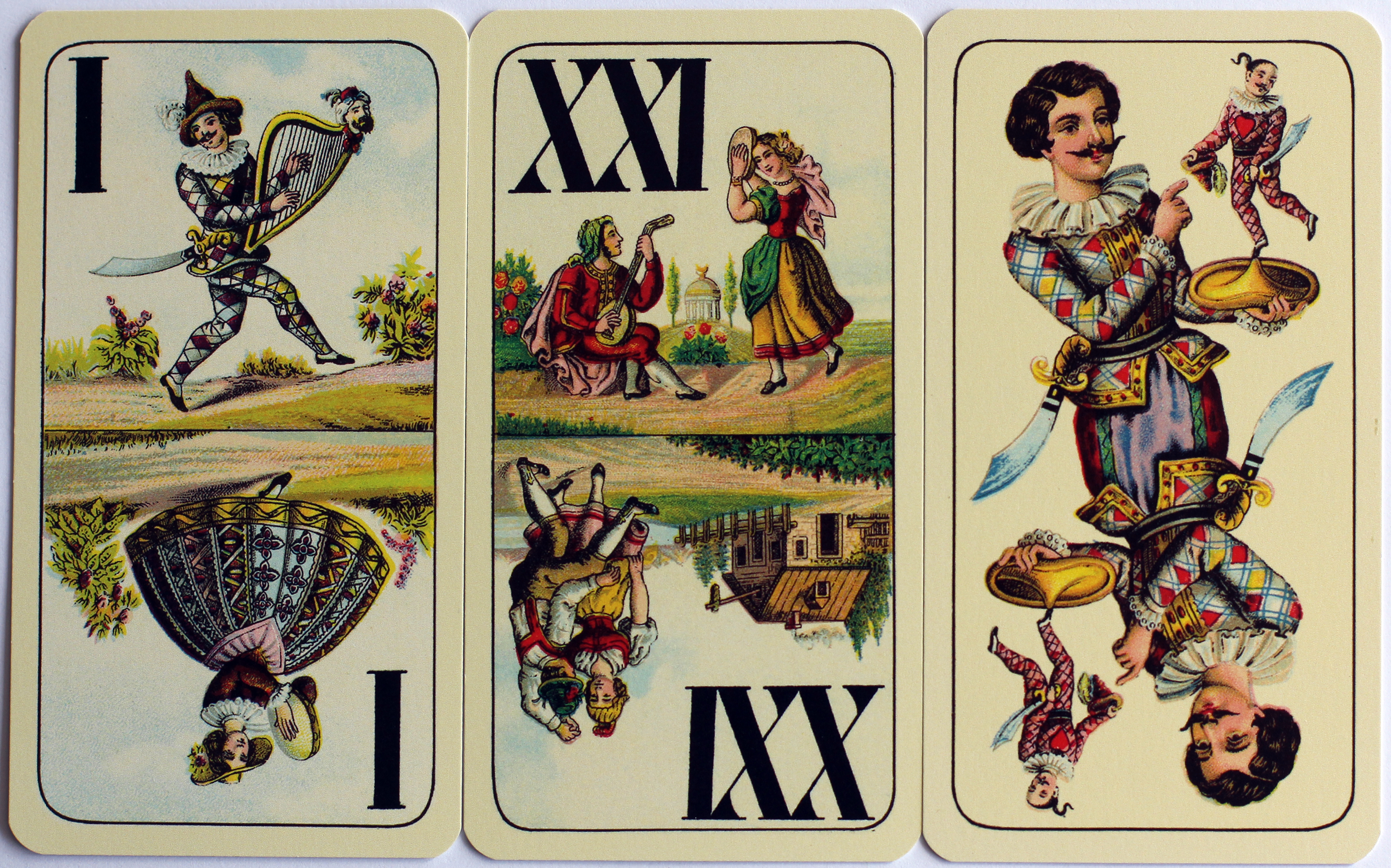
The Trull from an older, now basically extinct Austrian Tarock Type A pack: Pagat, Mond, Sküs

The trull is a trio of three special trump cards used in tarock games in Austria and other countries that have a much higher card value than the other trumps. The individual cards are known as trull cards (Trullstücke). The word trull is derived from the French tous les trois which means "all three".

In spite of its French roots the term is not common in the game of French tarot, where the trull cards are called les bouts ("butts", "ends") or, in earlier times, les oudlers, which has no other meaning. In German, they were initially called matadors, a word borrowed from the game (with ordinary cards) of Ombre.

== Introduction ==
The games of the tarot (French) or tarock (German) family are distinguished mainly in that, in addition to the suit cards, their decks have a series of 21 classical, permanent trumps, most of which are numbered with Roman or Arabic numerals. In games of German-language origin the trumps are also called tarocks. The special role of the 'fool' (Narren) is described below.

Tarock games are trick-taking card games, in which the cards have values in addition to their trick-taking power or ranking. In German these values are known as Augen which means "pips" or "card points". In most variants of Tarock there is, however, a complex system of scoring – the Tarock scoring scheme – which usually involves counting the cards in threes and deducting two points each time, but may also use fractions (e. g. 4 1/3), which are subsequently rounded to the nearest natural number.

== Trull cards ==
The following three cards form the Trull:

=== Tarock I: the Pagat or Spatz ===
Tarock I, the smallest trump, is traditionally called the Pagat. The name is derived from the Italian bagatto, which has no other meaning, but is related to bagatelle which refers to "something... that is small and not important". The name probably alludes, therefore, to its status as the lowest trump card. It is also referred to as the Spatz ("sparrow"), a typical German term for a low-value card.

There is often a bonus for taking the last trick of a deal with the Pagat and known as Pagat Ultimo.

In French Tarock the card is called le petit ("the little one").

=== Tarock XXI: the Mond ===
Tarock XXI – the "Mond" – is traditionally the highest tarock. Its name is a false Germanization of the French le monde or Italian il mondo which mean "world" not "moon". In those variants where the Sküs is the highest tarock, the Mond is of course the second highest. In the Black Forest Alemannic dialect used by players of Cego and Dreierles it is called and spelt "Mund".

=== The Fool, Scüs, Sküs or Gstieß ===
The Fool (German: der Narr; Italian: il matto) is often compared to the Joker in more recent card games. In modern Tarock variants, for example, it is represented as a minstrel, harlequin or vagrant.

Traditionally, it is a special card that can be played to any trick, bypassing the suit rules. It can neither win nor lose the trick; if the trick is taken by the player with the highest card, the player of the Fool recovers it to his own pile of tricks. According to most, but not all rules, he gives the winner of the trick a blank (worthless card) from his own tricks instead.

In the French Tarot variants, the Fool is traditionally played with a ritualized excuse, comparable to a tennis player who says "Sorry" after hitting the ball into the net. Thus it is also called l'excuse, from which developed its German name Sküs and other dialect expressions like Gstieß. "Excuse" is also the technical term for the role of the special card in English tarot literature.

In most Tarock variants from the former Habsburg monarchy the Sküs took over the role of the 22nd and highest trump card, retaining its name, despite its new role.

== General role ==
The Trull plays a special role in the rules of almost all Tarock card games. The (rounded up) value of each card in the trull is five points, while all other trump cards (usually 19) count only one point each. This applies regardless of whether the Fool is the traditional special card or the highest trump card. Only in regional Italian variants can there be other trump cards that count more than one point. In some Tarock games, such as the Rhaeto-Romanic Troccas, the trull has no meaning beyond its point value and sometimes no collective name. In many others, however, many additional roles are added to it.

== Role in individual Tarot games ==
=== French Tarot ===
In French Tarot (3-5 players), the bouts have a significance far above their nominal value. How many points a player needs to win the game depends on the number of bouts in his tricks. The cards together are worth 91 points, so a majority would be 46, but a player only needs 41 to win the game if he has two bouts among his tricks and only 36 if he has all three. Conversely, with only one bout he needs 51 points; and with none, as many as 56.

The Excuse plays its traditional role as a special card with some additional rules. It can also be lost if it is only played in the last trick; conversely, if a player has previously won all tricks, it can also exceptionally win the last trick.

Since the 21 cannot be lost at all and neither, de facto, can the Excuse, it is of great importance to retain or capture the Petit.

There is also a bonus when the Petit is played in the last trick for the side that wins the trick. In contrast to Austrian Tarock variants, the Petit does not have to be captured by oneself, but may also be won by a partner.

=== Königrufen ===
In the Austrian Tarock game, Königrufen (4 players), the trull cards have several additional functions. The Sküs is the highest trump card.

Whoever has the complete trull in his tricks at the end receives an additional bonus in addition to the game points. This can be announced in advance and then counts twice. There is another (also announced) bonus if the Pagat wins the last trick (Pagat Ultimo).

Although it isn't in all rules, there is often another bonus for capturing the Moon (Mondfang), if the Moon is taken by the Sküs. Rules vary as to whether this may also be declared in advance, whether it only counts if taken from opponents or when one's partner captures the Moon.

If players agree to a Kaiserstich ("Imperial Capture") or Märchenstick ("Fairytale Capture"), then the Pagat wins if the entire trull is played to one trick.

Analogous to trull, is the "Royal Trull" (Königstrull), when one side has all four Kings in its tricks. Usually this counts as much as the trull.

=== Hungarian Tarokk ===
It is in Hungarian Tarokk that the trull cards, also called 'honours', have the greatest role (4 players). It is only possible for a player to bid, and thus compete to become the declarer, if he has a trull card. The Skíz, i.e. the Fool, is the highest trump card. The three cards together are called trull, tuli, trúl or, based on the original French expression, tulétroá (from French tous les trois, "all three").

The game is primarily aimed at the bonus associated with capturing the Moon i.e. to seize the opponent's trump XXI with the Skiz. Nevertheless, the name of this card has been lost in Hungarian, it is simply huszonegy ("twenty-one"), and its capture is huszonegyfogás.

As in Königrufen, it counts as a bonus, which may be declared beforehand, if a player has the trull in his tricks at the end of the game. In Hungarian Tarock, however, it is customary to declare them only to indicate that the two "high" trull pieces are with the same team, which can make expensive additional declarations possible.

The pagát can be played as a bonus to win the last trick (ultimo), either announced in advance or taken "quietly" for half the points.

Illustrated Hungarian Tarokk

In the "illustrated" form of Hungarian Tarokk, which has many additional contracts, the trull cards acquired further roles. For example, the pagát can also be played in the penultimate trick (uhu), but this must be announced in advance if it is to count as a bonus.

Furthermore, there is a special bonus for winning the first six tricks and the sixth with the XXI (kismadár, "little bird"). Similarly, winning the first seven tricks, the seventh of which is Skíz, nagymadár ("great bird"), attracts a bonus. These two must also be announced in advance.

=== Cego ===
The Baden game of Cego attributes no collective value to the trull and therefore has no name for it. The smallest trump - which has numerous regional names, such as der Kleine Mann (the Little Man), Pagat, Babberle, Geiß (goat) or Pfeif (pipe or whistle, also pejorative for "lame duck") - plays special roles. A special game called Ultimo can be declared, in which the sole object is to win the last trick with the Pagat. In the highest normal game with a talon known as the Cego, the player undertakes to play the Pagat in the first trick, i.e. to leave this high value card with the opponents and try to win the game with the rest of his cards.

In a local variant known as Ministrant's Version (Ministrantenversion) all three trull cards play an additional special role: In Geregelter Räuber (regulated Thief), where everyone plays against everyone for as few points as possible, the trull cards must be played in the first three tricks: the Stiess to the first, the Mond to the second and the Geiss to the third. To comply with this rule, players may ignore the requirement to follow suit.

=== Dreierles ===
There is a variant of Tapp Tarock in Baden, known as Dreierles, in which the Trull does feature as a bonus. In Dreierles, the Tarocks are known in the local dialect as Drucks and the Trull is the Droll or Drull and the bonus is the Drullrolle. The Fool is the Gstieß, Stieß or der Alt ("the Old Man"), the Tarock 21 is usually just the 21 or 21-er but in one circle is known as the Eisen ("Iron") and, as in Cego, the Pagat is the Pfeif, Pfeife or Pfiff.
