= Robert Sedlaczek =

Austrian author (born 1952)

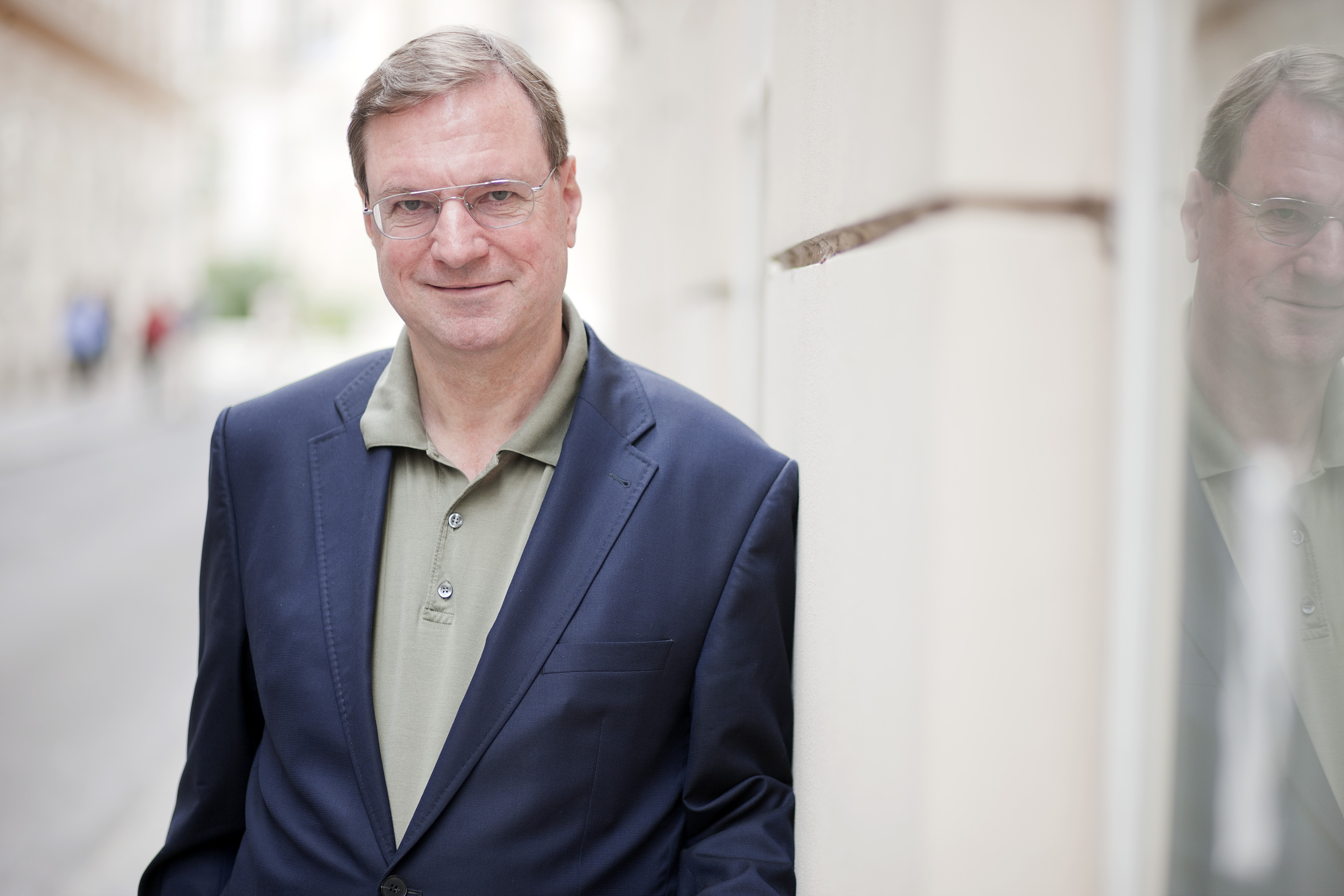
Robert Sedlaczek (2014)

Robert Sedlaczek (born 1952) is an Austrian journalist, Germanist, expert for Austrian German, and non-fiction author. He is best known for his works on aspects of the German language. In addition, he writes books and articles on cultural history topics. In his book Die Tante Jolesch und ihre Zeit. Eine Recherche he traced the history of the industrial family of the same name as well as the lawyer, Hugo Sperber. These people are characters in Friedrich Torberg's book Die Tante Jolesch.

== Life ==
Robert Sedlaczek was born 2 April 1952 in Vienna. He studied German Studies, English Studies and Journalism in Vienna, earning a Doctor of Philosophy. From 1973 to 1978, he worked as an editor for the news agency, United Press International. After working as a freelance journalist, among others for the magazine Extrablatt, he became press spokesman for the Austrian Chancellor, Bruno Kreisky in 1980, and, later, for Ferdinand Lacina. From 1986 to 1990, he was a member of the curatorium of the Austrian Broadcasting Corporation or ORF, from 1989 to 2003, he was Managing Director of the Austrian Federal Publishing House, (Österreichischer Bundesverlag). Since 2005, he has been working as a columnist in the feature section of the Wiener Zeitung, and since 2009 he has written the section "German for Journalists" for the industry magazine Der österreichische Journalist. He writes books for the publishers, Amalthea Signum, for Haymon of Innsbruck, for Edition Atelier of Vienna, and for Ueberreuter, also of Vienna.

Sedlaczek has been married to Melita Sedlaczek since 1988, who also supports him as a co-author of his books, and has a stepdaughter, whom he adopted as a child. Sedlaczek lives in Vienna and Neulengbach, a town on the western edge of the Vienna Woods.

In 1994, Sedlaczek and co-author Werner Schima received the Steinfeder Prize for wine journalism from the Vinea Wachau Nobilis Districtus for the Austrian wine guide Unser Wein, which was published several times.

== Collaboration with Martin Czapka ==
Robert Sedlaczek has worked with illustrator, Martin Czapka, since 2016. Czapka runs an advertising studio in Vienna and illustrated the books published by Amalthea: Österreichisch für Anfänger, Österreich für Fortgeschrittene and Österreichisch fia Fuaßboifäns, as well the quiz games Das neue Österreich Quiz and Challenge Austria released by Ferdinand Piatnik & Sons.

== Austrian German ==
Sedlaczek is one of the most prominent voices of Austrian German, both as a standard variety of German ("österreichisches Standarddeutsch") and as a range of dialects, especially for Viennese and Eastern Austrian dialects, for which he has published widely. His regular column in Wiener Zeitung, "Sedlaczek am Mittwoch", has for over 20 years explored many aspects of Austrian German, e.g. Meidling "L" (dark /l/ à la Vienna- Meidling, pressure from German Standard German (2004, 2021), gender issues and language (2020), Viennese dialects (2011). Since the discontinuation of Wiener Zeitung as a daily newspaper in 2023, Sedlaczek has been publishing his regular language columns as a blog.

Sedlaczek is the author of several dictionaries of varieties of Austrian German with Haymon Publishers (Innsbruck). These include Wörterbuch des Wienerischen. (with Melita Sedlaczek), Haymon Taschenbuchverlag, 2011, ISBN 978-3-85218-891-1, Wörterbuch der Alltagssprache Österreichs, Haymon 2011 (7th ed. 2019) or Das große Wörterbuch des Wienerischen, 2023. One aspect worth mentioning is that Sedlaczek, like the makers of Österreichisches Wörterbuch, writes outside of academically institutionalized Germanistik, who have consistently ignored Standard Austrian German and Austrian German as a stand-alone, legitimate research stance. A fact that has recently led to the formulation of a One Standard German Axiom in academic Germanistik.

== Engagement with Tarock ==
Sedlaczek is a major promoter of Tarock card games. Das große Tarock-Buch ("The Big Tarock Book"), written with Wolfgang Mayr and Roland Kronigl, and Die Strategie des Tarockspiels ("The Strategy of the Game of Tarock"), written with Wolfgang Mayr, are regarded as standard German-language works for this family of card games. Together with Mayr, he founded the Vienna Tarock Cup (Wiener Tarockcup) in 2003 for the Tarock game of Königrufen and initiated a final for the Austrian tournament series, which is held annually at Linz Casino. Sedlaczek is also the main initiator of the reintroduction of Hungarian Tarock in Austria. From 2005 to 2018, in his Tarock columns in the Wiener Zeitung, he and Wolfgang Mayr gave tactical tips for the variants of Tarock common in Austria; he is currently writing a similar series with his wife Melita for the Oberösterreichisches Volksblatt (Upper Austrian News). His latest publication on the subject is Kulturgeschichte des Tarockspiels. Geschichten über Tarock und seine berühmten Spieler (The Cultural History of Tarock: Stories about Tarock and its Famous Players") which he again co-authored with Mayr.

== Works ==
Works that Robert Sedlaczek has published include the following:

- Österreichisch für Fortgeschrittene. Ein heiteres Lexikon in Zusammenarbeit mit Melita Sedlaczek. Illustriert von Martin Czapka Amalthea, Vienna, 2018. ISBN 978-3-99050-118-4
- Österreichisch für Anfänger. Ein heiteres Lexikon in Zusammenarbeit mit Melita Sedlaczek. Illustriert von Martin Czapka Amalthea, Vienna, 2017. ISBN 978-3-903083-61-5
- Österreichisch fia Fuaßboifäns. Ein heiteres Lexikon in Zusammenarbeit mit Melita Sedlaczek. Illustriert von Martin Czapka Amalthea, Vienna, 2016. ISBN 978-3-99050-038-5
- Die Kulturgeschichte des Tarockspiels. Geschichten über Tarock und seine berühmten Spieler. (with Wolfgang Mayr), Edition Atelier, Vienna, 2015. ISBN 978-3-903005-11-2
- Das unanständige Lexikon. Tabuwörter der deutschen Sprache und ihre Herkunft. (with Christoph Winder), Haymon-Verlag, Innsbruck, 2014. ISBN 978-3-7099-7136-9
- Die Tante Jolesch und ihre Zeit. Eine Recherche. (with Melita Sedlaczek and Wolfgang Mayr), Haymon-Verlag, Innsbruck, 2013. ISBN 978-3-7099-7069-0
- Das Radio-Tirol-Wörterbuch der Tiroler Mundarten. (co-authored with Hans Moser), Haymon-Taschenbuchverlag, Innsbruck, 2013. ISBN 978-3-85218-948-2
- Wiener Wortgeschichten. Von Pflasterhirschen und Winterschwalben. (read by Christian Spatzek, Robert Sedlaczek and Reinhard Badegruber), edition-o im Verlagsbüro Schwarzer, Vienna, 2013. ISBN 978-3-99022-077-1
- Wiener Wortgeschichten. Von Pflasterhirschen und Winterschwalben. (mit Melita Sedlaczek und Reinhard Badegruber), Haymon-Verlag, Innsbruck, 2012. ISBN 978-3-7099-7017-1
- Wörterbuch des Wienerischen. (with Melita Sedlaczek), Haymon Taschenbuchverlag, 2011, ISBN 978-3-85218-891-1.
- Wörterbuch der Alltagssprache Österreichs. (with Melita Sedlaczek), Haymon Taschenbuchverlag, 2011, ISBN 978-3-85218-873-7.
- Wenn ist nicht würdelos. Rot-weiß-rote Markierungen durch das Dickicht der Sprache. (with Melita Sedlaczek), Ueberreuter 2010, ISBN 978-3-8000-7463-1.
- Kleines Handbuch der bedrohten Wörter Österreichs. (with Melita Sedlaczek), Ueberreuter 2007, ISBN 978-3-8000-7320-7.
- Leet & Leiwand. Das Lexikon der Jugendsprache (with Roberta Baron): Mehr als 250 Ausdrücke und Redensarten. Echomedia 2005, ISBN 978-3-901761-49-2.
- Das österreichische Deutsch. (with Melita Sedlaczek), Ueberreuter 2004, ISBN 978-3-8000-7075-6; Haymon Verlag, 2014 ISBN 978-3-7099-7168-0.
- Lexikon der Sprachirrtümer Österreichs. (with Sigmar Grüner), Deuticke 2003, ISBN 978-3-216-40714-6.
- Das große Tarock-Buch. (with Wolfgang Mayr und Roland Kronigl), Edition Atelier 2001, ISBN 978-3-902498-25-0.
- Die Strategie des Tarockspiels. (with Wolfgang Mayr), Edition Atelier 2008, 4th expanded edn., 2014, ISBN 978-3-902498-22-9.
- Österreich für Feinschmecker. Das kulinarische Jahrbuch. (ed. mit Christoph Wagner), Deuticke 1994 ISBN 3-216-30106-0, 1995 ISBN 3-216-30155-9, 1996 ISBN 3-216-30248-2.
