= Wolfgang Mayr =

Austrian journalist (born 1944)

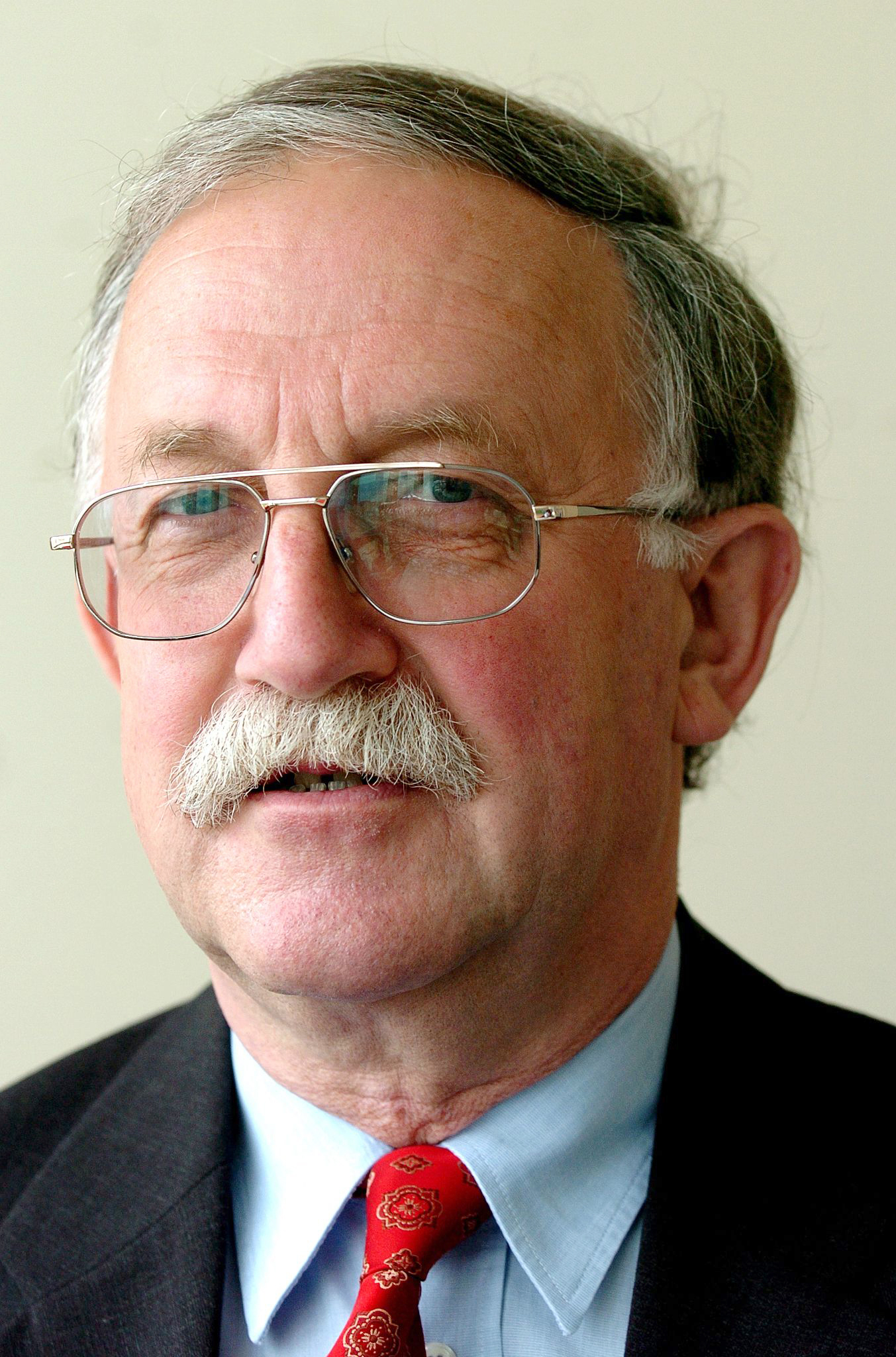
Image of Wolfgang Mayr

Wolfgang Mayr (born 1944) is an Austrian journalist and former chief editor of Austria Presse Agentur.

== Life ==
Mayr was born on 11 June 1944 in Schärding, Upper Austria. The son of an Innviertel teacher and merchant family, he attended the Stift Kremsmünster humanistic high school and then went to study in Vienna. In 1968, he joined the editorial team of the Austria Press Agency. In 1981 he became deputy head of department and in 1988 head of the foreign policy editorial department. From 1988 he worked as managing editor, became deputy editor-in-chief in 1993 and took over as successor to Josef A. Nowak in 1997. He campaigned for a modern and service-oriented agency, in particular by setting up an image service and a graphic editorial team in the 1980s and 1990s. He retired in 2005.

In addition to his journalistic work, Mayr is a passionate Tarock player and author of several books on the subject together with Robert Sedlaczek.

== Books (selection) ==
- Das große Tarock-Buch. (with Robert Sedlaczek and in cooperations with Roland Kronigl), Deuticke, Vienna, 2001, ISBN 978-3-852-23462-5.
- Die Kulturgeschichte des Tarockspiels. (with Robert Sedlaczek), Edition Atelier, Vienna, 2015, ISBN 978-3-903-00511-2.
- Die Strategie des Tarockspiels. (with Robert Sedlaczek), Edition Atelier, Vienna, 2016, ISBN 978-3-903-00531-0.

== See also ==
- Austria Presse Agentur
