= Femkort =

Card game

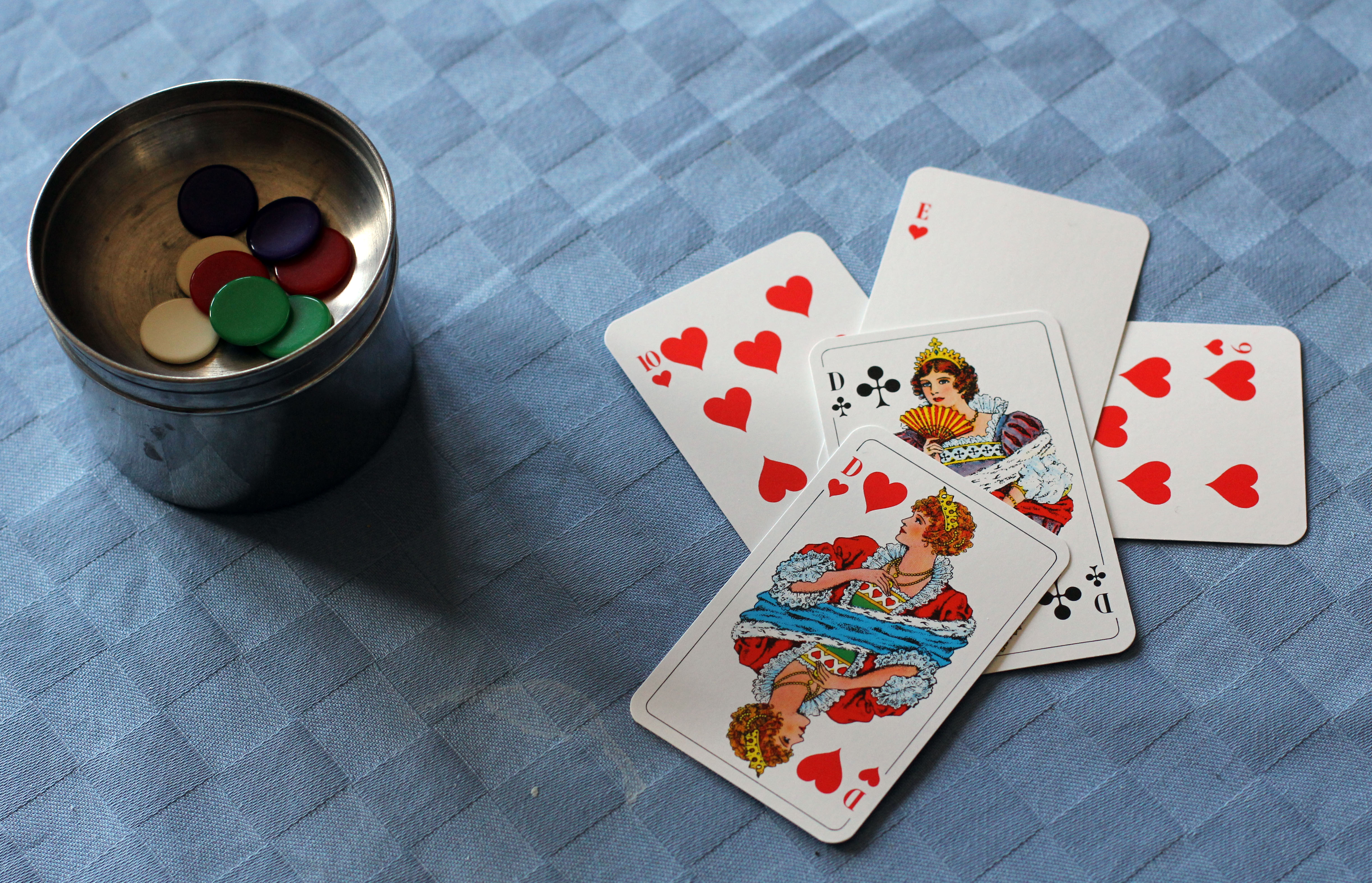
- The decisive final trick: the player with the Ace of Hearts wins the pot.
- Origin: Sweden
- Type: Last trick group
- Players: 3–8
- Cards: 52 cards
- Deck: French-suited, Swedish Modern pattern
- Rank (high→low): A K Q J 10 9 8 7 6 5 4 3 2
- Playing time: 5 min/deal

Related games
- Agram, Chicago, Letzter Stich, Toepen

Femkort ("Five Cards") is a classic Swedish card game for 3 to 8 players (Note: Other rules say 2 to 8 or even 10 players.) "with an unusual object", known since the 17th century, being mentioned in 1658 in Georg Stiernhielm's epic poem, Hercules (Herkules) as Fämkort. It is traditionally played with some kind of bet.

== Cards ==
The game is played with a standard 52-card French-suited pack usually of the Modern Swedish pattern.

== Early rules ==
The following rules are given in an 1847 Swedish games compendium:

Femkort may be played by any number of people from 3 to 8. The aim is solely to win the last trick. Everyone places a set stake into the pot or pool before the deal. Each player then receives 5 cards, but no trump is turned. Forehand leads to the first trick and the person who has taken home the trick leads to the next. The first four tricks are worth nothing; however, the one who takes the last trick has won the pot.

== Modern rules ==
There are two to ten players who receive five cards each from a standard 52-card pack and play for tricks. There are no trumps. Players must follow suit if they can and head the trick if able. The trick is taken by the highest card of the led suit and the winner of a trick leads to the next. Those who win any of the first four tricks play to the last. (Note: This rule is recorded by Parlett, but does not appear universal.) The winner of the fifth and final trick sweeps the pot.

=== Variations ===
- Before the last trick is played, any of the players can request "better cards", and if all agree to this, the cards are redealt.
- If forehand wants better cards, she may ask for a redeal and, if all agree, the cards are redealt.
- The first player to win three deals wins the partie.
- The first player to win an agreed number of deals, e.g. three, wins the pot.

== Literature ==
- Ny och fullständig svensk spelbok: eller Grundlig Anvisning Till Alla Nu Brukliga Kortspel. Gothenburg: D. F. Bonniers. 1847.
- Lek med en kortlek. Stockholm: B. Wahlström. 1993. pp. 44–45. ISBN 91-32-31783-2.
- Glimne, Dan (2016). Kortspelshandboken (3rd improved and expanded ed.). Stockholm: Känguru. ISBN 978-91-7663-115-7.
- Lundell, Hans (2010). Familjens bästa spel för kort och tärning (new ed.). Sundbyberg: Semic. p. 53. ISBN 978-91-552-5564-0.
- Parlett, David (2008). The Penguin Book of Card Games. London: Penguin. ISBN 978-0-141-03787-5.
- Stiernhielm, Georg (1658). Herkules. Uppsala.
- Sevedsdotter, Åsa (1991). Lagt kort ligger. Stockholm: Info Books. p. 38. ISBN 91-7003-097-9.
