= Agram =

Agram may refer to:

== Places ==
- Agram (Croatia), the historic German name for Zagreb, Croatia
- Agram Township, Morrison County, Minnesota, U.S.
- Agram, the Kanuri and Toubou name for the town of Fachi, eastern Niger
- Agram mountain range, in northeastern Niger; see Fachi

== Other ==
- Agram (card game)
- Agram 2000, a submachine gun from Croatia
- ŽNK Agram, women's football club in Zagreb, Croatia
