= Stripped deck =

Playing cards

A stripped deck or short deck (US), short pack or shortened pack (UK), is a set of playing cards reduced in size from a full pack or deck by the removal of a certain card or cards. The removed cards are usually pip cards, but can also be court cards or Tarot cards. Many card games use stripped decks, and stripped decks for popular games are commercially available.

== History ==
When playing cards first arrived in Europe during the 1370s, they had the same format as the modern standard 52-card deck, consisting of four suits each with ten pip cards and three face cards. During the late 14th and 15th centuries, the Spanish and Portuguese decks dropped the 10s while the German and Swiss packs removed the Aces to create 48-card decks. It is far easier to print 48 cards using two woodblocks than 52 cards. While the removal of the above cards was motivated by manufacturing considerations, later expulsions are the result of trying to speed up card games to make them more exciting. Trappola is the first known card game to be played with a deck that was stripped for game play. It removed all the cards from 3 to 6, inclusive, to create a 36-card deck.

The most popular card game in 16th-century Europe was Piquet, played with a 36-card deck that dropped ranks from 5 to 2. Around 1700, it dropped the 6s as well to create the 32-card deck, which is now the most popular format in France. 32 and 36-card decks are the most widespread in countries that were once part of the Holy Roman (the Low Countries, Germany, and Switzerland), Austro-Hungarian, and Russian empires. 24 card decks to play Schnapsen are widely available in central Europe, although it may be shortened to 20 in the future, as that is how the modern variant is now commonly played.

The Spanish, Portuguese, Italians, and Latin Americans use mostly 40-card decks. Unlike the countries above, they drop the higher-ranking numerals so that the 7 is located immediately under the face cards. This was due to the popularity of Ombre, the game that introduced the concept of bidding.

The British and the Scandinavians are the most resistant to shortened packs, having maintained the 52-card format since receiving them in the 15th century. The British have also propagated that pack size through whist, the most popular card game of the 19th century. In the 20th century, this has been followed by contract bridge, gin rummy, canasta, and poker which all require that deck size. The British prefer games involving four players as opposed to the continental three-player games which use smaller packs.

Asian countries also created stripped decks using their traditional playing cards. In contrast to the Western practice of removing ranks, Asians remove suits. During the Qing dynasty, the Chinese money-suited cards dropped one suit as rummy-type games became more popular. In India, the gambling game of Naqsha overtook the Ganjifa trick-taking game and many decks were made with only half of the traditional suits.

The opposite of a stripped deck is an expanded deck. Many commercial attempts have tried and failed to increase the standard deck above 52 cards. The most successful addition to the standard deck is the Joker which first appeared during the American Civil War as a Euchre trump card. The Joker has since been adopted as a wild card in a few other standard playing card games with different values and quantities depending on which game is being played. 500 is a Euchre offshoot invented by the United States Playing Card Company (USPCC) during the early 20th century. To play the six-handed version, USPCC created a deck with ranks 11, 12, and 13. 500 decks are now produced by other manufacturers and are sold primarily in English-speaking countries where the game is played. A much older expanded deck is tarot, invented in 15th-century Italy, with an extra suit of trumps and an extra rank. Tarot card games were the most popular card games of the 18th century but have since declined. They are still played in various continental European countries with France having the largest community. Tarot decks are not immune to stripping either. The Tarocco Bolognese, Tarocco Siciliano, Industrie und Glück, and Cego decks have excised some pip cards.

== Piquet deck ==
A French-suited deck of 32 cards, consisting of 7, 8, 9, 10, Jack, Queen, King and Ace in four suits each, is used in the two-player game Piquet, which dates back to the 16th century. Games played with a piquet deck (or the equivalent German- or Swiss-suited decks) are still among the most popular in some parts of Europe. This includes belote and klaverjas (the national games of France and the Netherlands, respectively) and skat (the German national game, which is also played with the equivalent German-suited decks in some regions). Bezique is played with two piquet decks.

== In poker variants ==
Stripped decks are used in certain poker variants. The earliest form of poker was played with only 20 cards. The Australian game of Manila uses a piquet deck, and Mexican stud is played with the 8s, 9s, and 10s removed from the deck (and a joker added). This may require adjusting hand values: in both of these games, a flush ranks above a full house, because having fewer cards of each suit available makes flushes rarer.

A hand such as 6-7-J-Q-K plays as a straight in Mexican stud, skipping over the removed ranks. Some places may allow a hand such as 10-9-8-7-A to play as a straight (by analogy to a wheel) in the 32-card game, the A playing low and skipping over the removed ranks (although this is not the case in Manila). Finally, the relative frequency of straights versus three of a kind is also sensitive to the deck composition (and to the number of cards dealt), so some places may consider three of a kind to be superior to a straight, but the difference is small enough that this complication is not necessary for most games. Similarly, a full house tends to occur more often than a flush in a piquet deck, due to the increased frequency of each playing card rank, creating a change in poker combination ranking.

Five-card stud is also often played with a piquet deck. In lively home games it might work better to only strip three ranks (2s through 4s) with seven or eight players; with only two or three players 7s and 8s could be stripped as well, leaving the same 24-card deck used in euchre. In any of these cases, a flush should rank above a full house (in a 24-card deck it is actually rarer than four of a kind, but is rarely played that flushes are superior to four of a kind). Stripped deck five-card stud is a game particularly susceptible to cheating by collusion, because it is easy for partners to signal a single hole card and the relative value of knowing the location of a single card is higher than with a full deck.

== Other games ==
The game of euchre is also played with a 24-card stripped deck, consisting of only 9-10-J-Q-K-A of each suit, the 2–8 being stripped from the deck. The game of pinochle is played with 48 cards, consisting of a doubled euchre deck (that is, two copies of 9–A of each suit). Crazy eights may be played using the cards normally stripped from a euchre deck (2–8 of each suit).

In some games, a small number of cards are stripped from the deck to make the deal exact. For example, it is customary to remove the 2♣ when three people play Hearts.

== See also ==
- List of traditional card and tile packs
- Card games
- Playing cards
- Tarot
