= The Card Players II =

Painting by Almanach

- Kvartopirci II (Slovene)
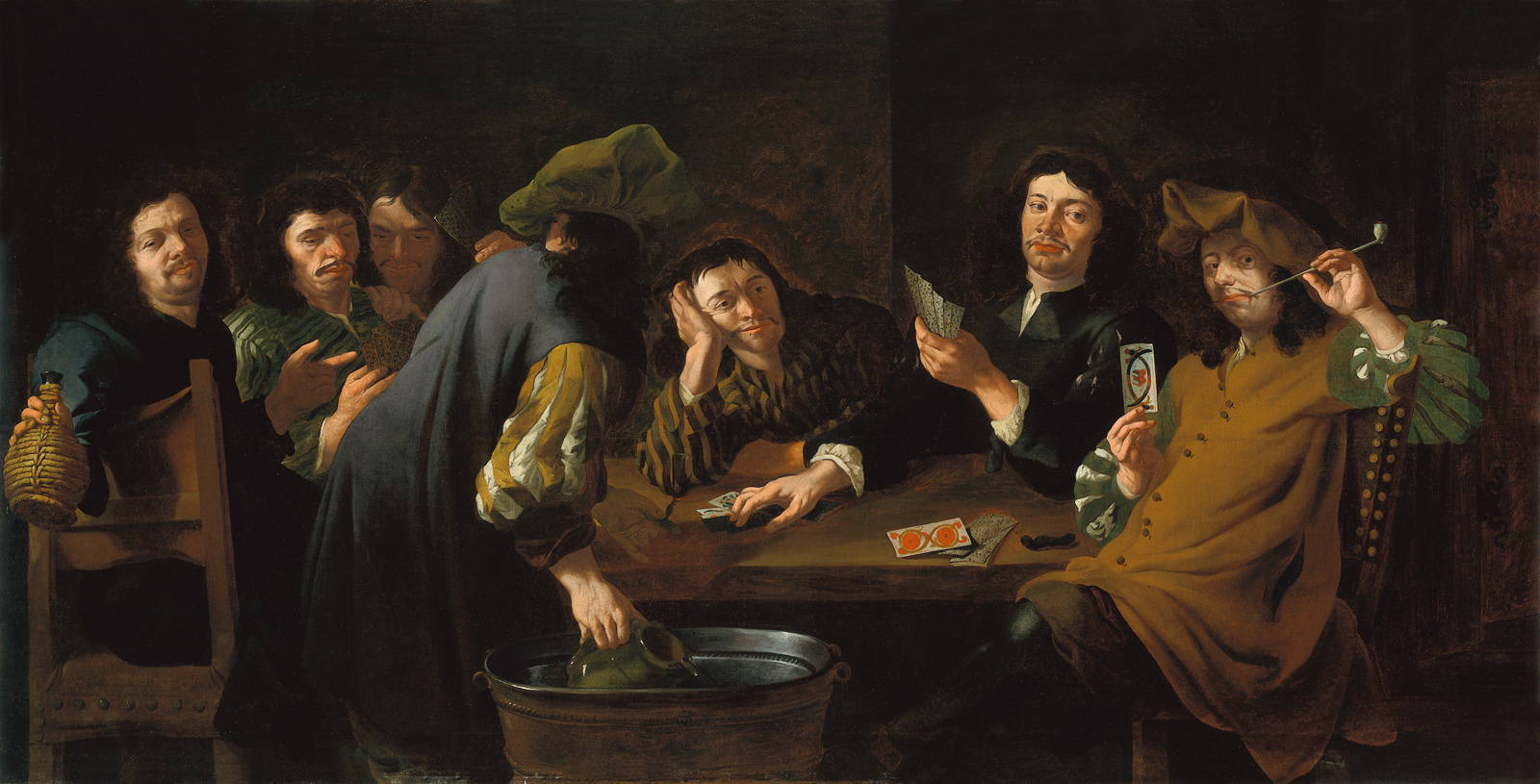
- Artist: Almanach
- Year: 1650
- Medium: oil on canvas
- Dimensions: 147 cm × 285 cm (58 in × 112 in)
- Location: National Gallery of Slovenia; Ljubljana

The Card Players II (Slovenian: Kvartopirci II) is a painting by the 17th-century Dutch artist Almanach. It is painted in oil on canvas and has dimensions of 147 x 2855 cm. The painting is in the collection of the National Gallery of Slovenia in Ljubljana, which purchased it in 1995.

The composition is closely related to the Cheerful Company at Table (The Card Players I), also in the National Gallery of Slovenia. The group are playing the Italian game of trappola. On the table is a rolled piece of tobacco. The painting shows the influence of Caravaggio.

The painter Almanach, about whom little is known, was from Antwerp, and worked in Carniola, Slovenia, between 1667 and 1680. The art historian Uroš Lubej believes Almanach may have been the Dutch painter Herman Verelst.

== Sources ==
- Barbara Jaki (2004). National Gallery of Slovenia: guide to the permanent collection : painting and sculpture in Slovenia from 13th to the 20th century. National Gallery of Slovenia.
