= Fünfzehnern =

Card game

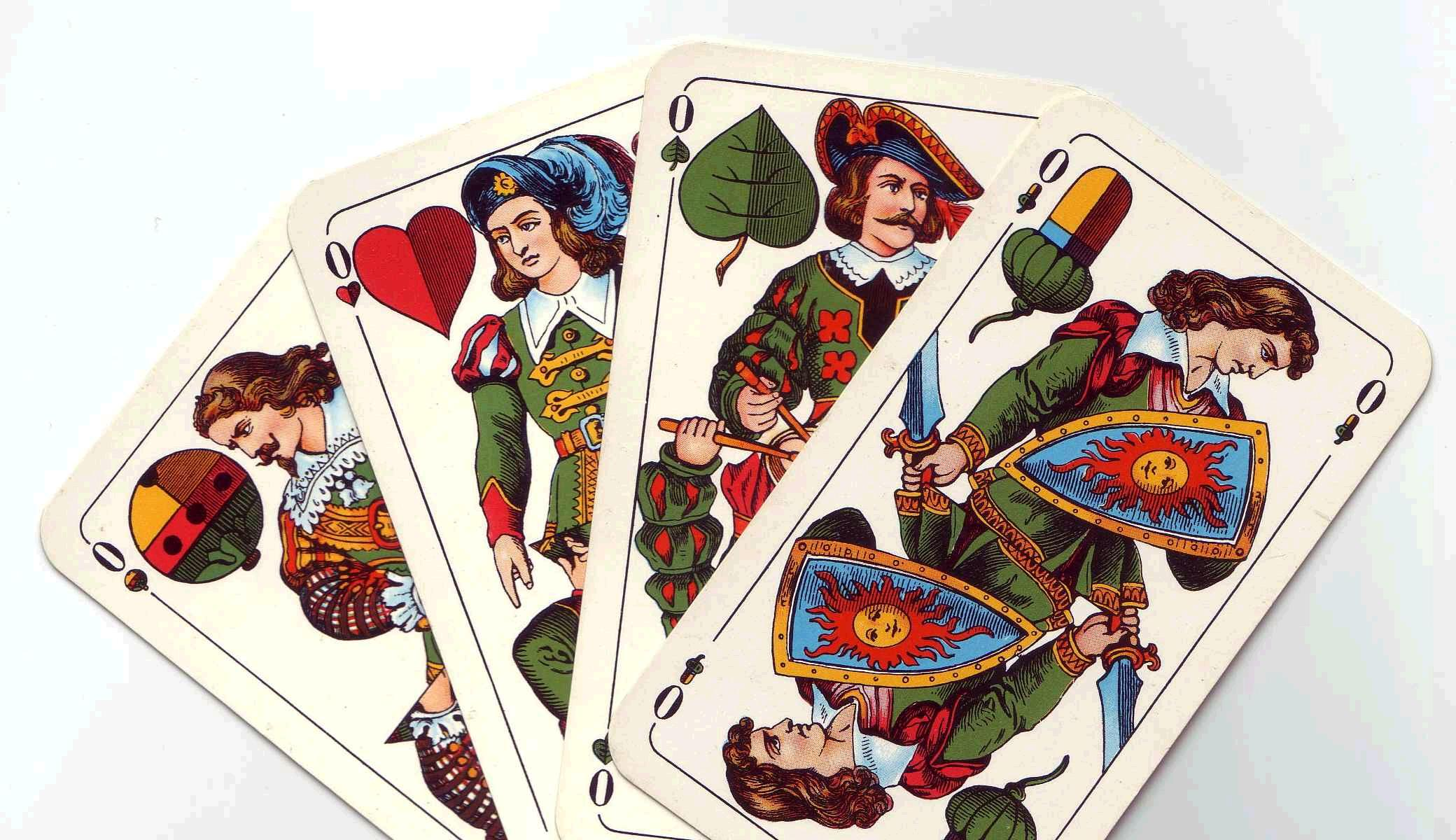
- A picture of four Obers of German cards
- Type: Point-trick
- Players: 4
- Cards: 32-card
- Deck: German
- Rank (high→low): A K Q J 10 9 8 7

Fünfzehnern is a simple, German, 8-card, no-trumps, point-trick card game for four individual players using a 32-card piquet pack. The game has a simplistic card-point schedule and unusual restrictions on leading to a trick.

The game is first described in 1811 in Hammer's die deutschen Kartenspiele.

== Relaxed rules ==
Ranks and card-point values
Rank	A	K	Q	J	10	9	8	7
Value	5	4	3	2	1	–		

Tens rank low. All cards are dealt to the players, each receiving 8 cards. Eldest hand leads any card to the first trick. Apart from the Zwang rule and restrictions on leading, both described below, the standard rules of trick-play as in Whist apply. Players must follow suit if they can but are otherwise completely free in what they play to a trick led by another player. The trick is won with the highest card of the suit led. The winner of a trick leads to the next trick.

A player who wins the lead, by winning a trick to which another player led, is subject to the following restriction. As long as the player retains the lead and has any cards left in the suit in which he or she won the lead, the player must play cards of that suit. An important exception to this rule is that any unbeatable cards in other suits may be played first, or in between.

A player who holds king and queen of the same suit and leads the queen to a trick may announce Zwang ("force") or Zwicker. This forces the player who holds the ace of the same suit to take the trick with it.

The object of the game is to win as many of the 60 card-points as possible. Players score the difference between their card-points and the average, which is always fifteen. In other words, fifteen card-points are required for a score of zero, and a player who has more or less than that wins or loses the difference.

== Strict rules ==
The only difference to the relaxed rules is that the restrictions on leading are even stricter.

A player who wins the lead, by winning a trick to which another player led, is subject to the following restriction. As long as the player retains the lead and has any cards left in the suit in which he or she won the lead, the player must play cards of that suit. After that, as long as the player retains the lead and has any cards of the suit in which the previous player won the lead, the player must play cards in that suit.

Unbeatable cards in other suits may still be played first, or in between.

== Variations ==
The game was sometimes played without the Zwang rule.

In some places the scoring was customarily simplified if two players won all the tricks among them. In this case the card-points were not counted. The two players who did not win any tricks paid 15 each as usual, and each of the other players received 15, even though one of them might have had less than 15 card-points in the tricks won.

Fünfzehnern has highly unusual restrictions on leading that were regarded as depressing by many players who could not play out what looked otherwise like a good hand. (A German encyclopedia entry from 1907 does not mention any such restrictions, but it also omits the Zwang rule.) This led to the introduction of the relaxed rules described above. Several quite different versions of the restrictions on leading have also appeared in the literature.

According to a German anthology from 1880, the suit of the card led to the first trick has a special status. Any further lead by any player must be from the same suit if possible. However, players holding only a single card from some other suit may lead with that first

In a recent German game anthology which covers the game for its simplicity, originality and historical interest, the restriction is described as follows. A player who won a trick led by another player does not have free choice of cards for leading to the next trick. If possible, the player must play from the suit of the previous trick, and must play his or her highest card in that suit. A player in this situation who is blank in the suit of the previous trick must play from any suit that has been led previously in the game, and again must play his or her highest card in that suit. If this is also not possible, the player may lead from any remaining suit and may choose any card from that suit. When leading for the second time in a row, players may lead any card without restriction.

According to David Parlett, the "inevitable complication" of the game is as follows. A player who wins the lead must lead with a card of the suit that was previously led if possible, and must play an unbeatable card of that suit if possible. Failing that, the player must, if possible, play a card of a previously led suit.

== Adaptation to three players ==
Three players can play with 24 cards, after removing one suit.

== History and etymology ==
Fünfzehnern is German for fifteening and evidently refers to the number of card-points that one needs to attain for an even score. David Parlett calls Fünfzehnern "a traditional German game of unknown date", but suggests that its lack of trumps is "an ancient feature". He presents it as the only example for its specific card-point schedule. Parlett's reference for the game is a German card game book from 1873.

== Literature ==
- Hammer, Paul (1811). die deutschen Kartenspiele, Weygand, Leipzig.
