= Trappola =

16th-century Venetian card game

- Old Venetian two-hander
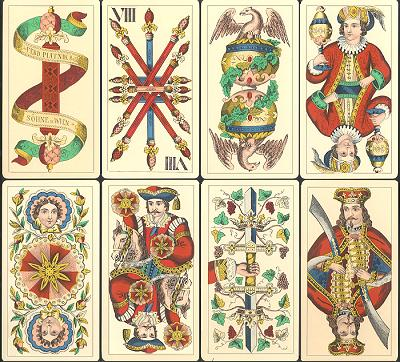
- Trappola cards produced in Vienna by card manufacturer, Ferdinand Piatnik & Sons.
- Origin: Venice, Italy
- Family: Trick-taking
- Players: 2–4
- Skills: Strategy
- Cards: 36
- Deck: Trappola deck / German deck
- Rank (high→low): A K C J 10 9 8 7 2
- Play: Clockwise
- Playing time: 25 min.
- Chance: Medium

Trappola is an early 16th-century Venetian trick-taking card game which spread to most parts of Central Europe and survived, in various forms and under various names like Trapulka, Bulka and Hundertspiel until perhaps the middle of the 20th century. It was played with a special pack of Italian-suited cards and last reported to have been manufactured in Prague in 1944. Piatnik has reprinted their old Trappola deck for collectors.

== History ==
We know from the Italian polymath and 'gambling scholar' Girolamo Cardano that Trappola was current in Venice "as early as 1524 and probably invented there". The original Venetian version described by Cardano in reasonable detail was for only two players and played without trumps or bidding. It is also the earliest known trick-taking game where the ace has been promoted above the king and played with a stripped deck.

From the 17th to 19th centuries, the game became popular in Central Europe after it declined in its homeland. In the 18th century, Central Europeans created versions that included three or four players, partnerships, trumps, and bidding. One particularly widespread descendant was Hundertspiel, also misleadingly called Hunderteins-Spiel, whose rules first appear in an 1824 treatise and in which two teams of two players competed to be first to reach the target of 100 points, hence the name. Trappola's focus on winning the last trick with a low card influenced other card games such as Tarot. Other forms of Trappola, like Špady and Šestadvacet, were popular in the Czechoslovakia before World War II when the last Trappola cards were produced. Trappola is likely to be the first card game encountered by Greeks as the Greek word for a deck of playing cards is "Τράπουλα", a transliteration of Trappola. It may have entered Greek from the Venetian-occupied Ionian Islands during the 16th century. In Corfu, Aspioti-ELKA produced Venetian pattern cards until 1940. Trappola card production ceased in 1944, the last packs being produced in Prague. However in 1988, Piatnik restarted production of a 36-card pack using a design of Trappola cards made in the Austro-Hungarian Empire in 1875.

A genuine Trappola game, perhaps the only known survivor of the Trappola group is the game Stovkahra, also known as Brčko, played by the Czechs of Romania in the village of Șumița, situated in the Banat region of Romania. In the absence of readily available Trappola cards, players there have resorted to using a 32-card German-suited deck. The reverse game, Coteccio, name applied to various negative point trick games in Italy is reported to be played in Trieste.

== Description ==
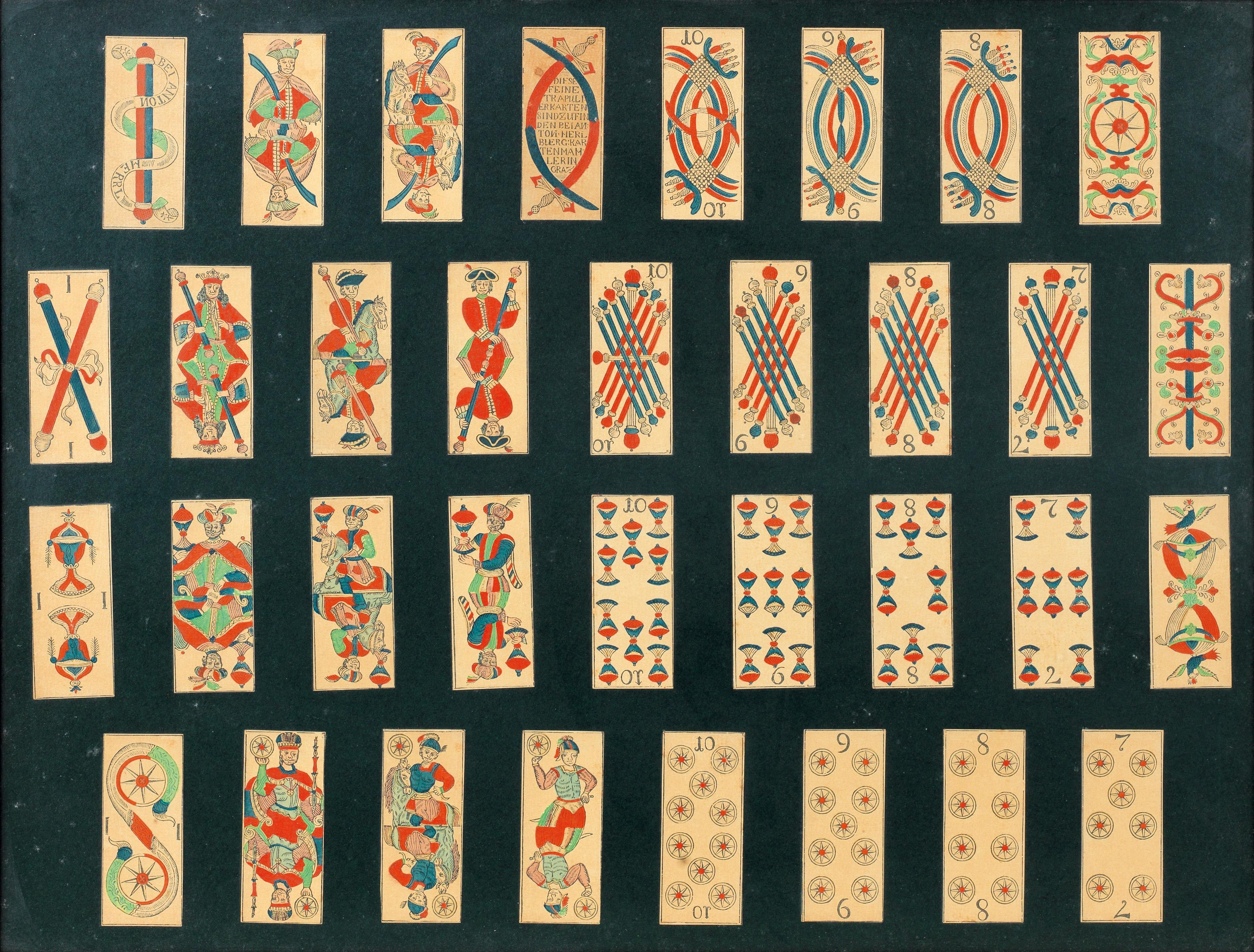
Trappola cards by Anton Herrl

=== The pack ===
The earliest standard pattern associated with this game dates to the mid-17th century. It may have been inspired by the cards used in Trento which lay between Venice and Austria. Trappola cards are among the first to become double-ended in the 18th century.

Suit Trappola
Suit				
English	Swords	Cups	Coins	Clubs
Venetian	Spade	Cope	Danari	Baston
Italian	Spade	Coppe	Denari	Bastoni
Spanish	Espadas	Copas	Oros	Bastos

Trappola packs have only 36 cards, lacking numerals from three to six, and using the Italian suits of swords, batons, cups and coins. It uses the Italian face cards of King, Cavalier and Foot-soldier (Jack). The names of the suits, called Denáry (Coins), Kopy (Cups), Špády (Swords), and Baštony (Batons) in Czech, are loan words borrowed from their Italian counterparts.

Trappola cards were last regularly manufactured in around 1948 by Piatnik. In 1988, Piatnik issued a facsimile set which is still available. It is accompanied by a rule book for the game of "Trappola (Bulka)" which describes rules for 3-4 players.

=== Rules ===
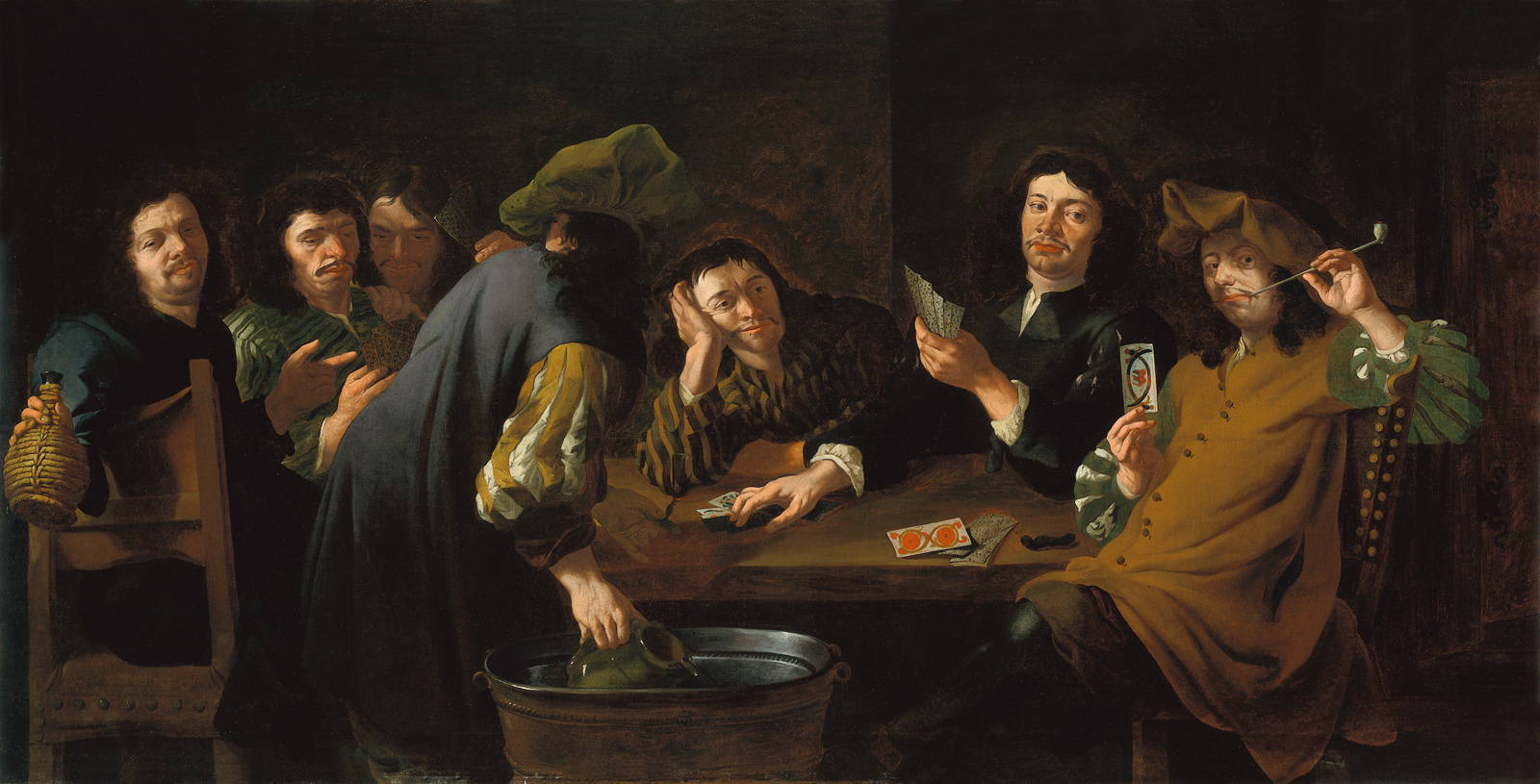
Trappola in a 17th-century painting by Almanach

The earliest surviving rules were recorded by Gerolamo Cardano in his 1564 Liber de Ludo Aleae. Trappola, in its original form, is a game for 2 players, the dealer and an opponent, with 9 cards dealt to each player in batches of five and then four. The opponent, if not satisfied with his cards, may discard them face up on the table and take in their place the first nine cards of the stock. If still not satisfied, they may do the same thing again, but must then play with the last nine cards taken from the stock. If they leave any, the dealer may then exercise the same option either once or twice, depending on how many cards remain. Exposed discards may not be taken up during the play.

The cards are ranked from highest to lowest: A K C J 10 9 8 7 2 in each suit. A player holding three or four Aces, Kings, Cavaliers, Jacks, or Deuces, may declare them any time before playing one of them to a trick, provided that, having only three, they have not already captured the fourth in a trick. The player does not specify their rank but only declares 'three figures' or 'four figures', except in the case of aces, where they explicitly declare 3 or 4 aces. The player doesn't have to show the cards nor disclose their suits. Because a declaration of figures in the case of them being deuces will carry different points then if they were Kings, Cavaliers or Jacks, this declaration is scored only when the trick-play is over and it is evident which was the case.

The opponent leads to the first trick, and the winner of this trick then leads to the next. Suit must be followed if possible, otherwise any card may be played. A trick is taken by the highest card of the suit led.

==== Scoring ====
After all cards are played, the score is calculated by adding the points from melds declared at the start of the game, the points from captured cards, and bonuses achieved.

Declarations	Three of a kind points	Four of a kind points
Aces	12	24
Deuces	10	20
Kings	6	12
Cavaliers	6	12
Jacks	6	12

Bonuses	Points
Taking a trick with a deuce	10
Taking the last trick	6
Taking the last trick with a deuce	26
Taking the last two tricks with deuces	52
Taking the last three tricks with deuces	78

Card taken	Points
Ace	6
King	5
Cavalier	4
Jack	3
All others	0

After scoring this hand, the opponent becomes the next dealer.

== Bibliography ==
- Parlett, David (2008). The Penguin Book of Card Games. London: Penguin.
- Dummett, Michael (1977). "Rules of Games. No. 6: Trappola" in The Journal of the Playing-Card Society, Vol. VI, No. 1. ISSN 0305-2133, August 1977, pp. 1–26.
- Dummett, Michael (1980). "Trappola" in The Game of Tarot, pp. 355–370. London: Duckworth.
