= Letzter =

Card game

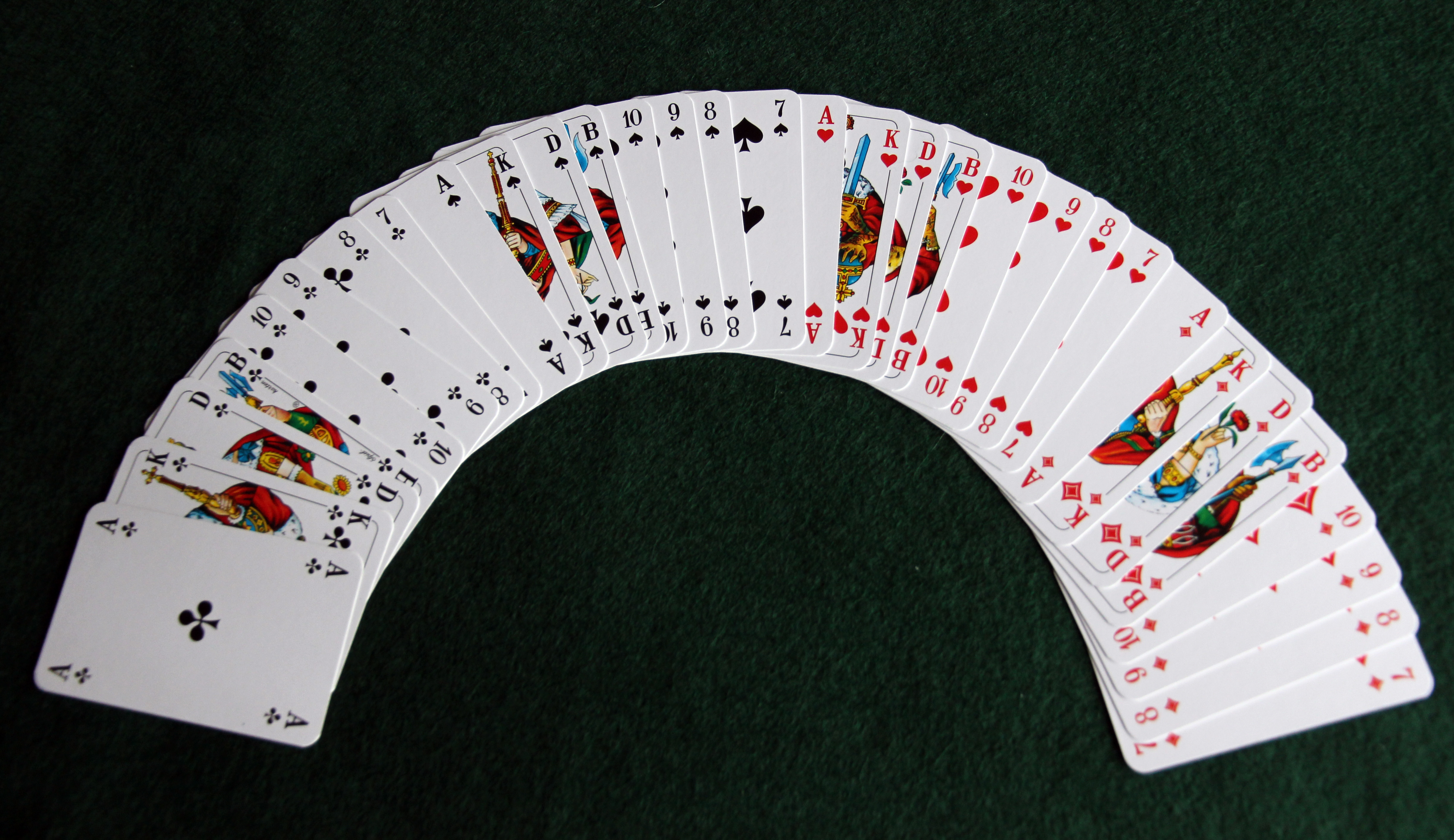
- French-suited 32-card pack used in Letzter
- Origin: Germany
- Type: Plain-trick game
- Family: Last Trick group
- Players: 3-4
- Age range: 6+
- Cards: 32
- Deck: Piquet
- Rank (high→low): A K O U 10 9 8 7
- Play: Anticlockwise

Letzter is a card game for 3 or 4 players in which the aim is not to win the last trick. It originated in Germany and the names mean "the last one". It should not be confused with Letzter Stich which is a much simpler, positive game in which the aim is to win the last trick.

== Rules ==
These rules are based on the Erweitertes Spielregelbüchlein aus Altenburg.

=== Four players ===
If four play, a full Piquet pack of 32 cards is used. The cards ranks (from highest to lowest) as follows: Ace, King, Queen, Jack, 10, 9, 8, 7. Seven cards are dealt to each player, the remaining 4 cards are held by the dealer. There are no trumps.

The dealer now 'shoves' any 3 cards (typically low value ones) to rearhand (the player on his left). Rearhand shoves any 2 cards to middlehand, who shoves one card in turn to forehand on the dealer's right. Thus everyone ends up with 8 cards.

Forehand now leads to the first trick and the remaining players, in clockwise order, aim to follow suit. If they are unable to, they may discard any card. The player who plays the highest card of the led suit wins the trick and leads to the next. The first 7 tricks do not count as far as the result is concerned, but the winner of the last trick, loses the game and scores a penalty point. If a player wins all the tricks, called a march (Durchmarsch), however, he wins and everyone else gets a penalty point.

=== Three players ===
If three play, the Sevens and Eights are removed. Each player is dealt 7 cards, the dealer gets 10. The dealer shoves 2 cards to rearhand who shoves one to middlehand, so that each player has a hand of 8 cards. Otherwise the rules are the same as those of the four-hand game.
