= Bassadewitz =

Traditional card game

- A trick-taking avoidance game.
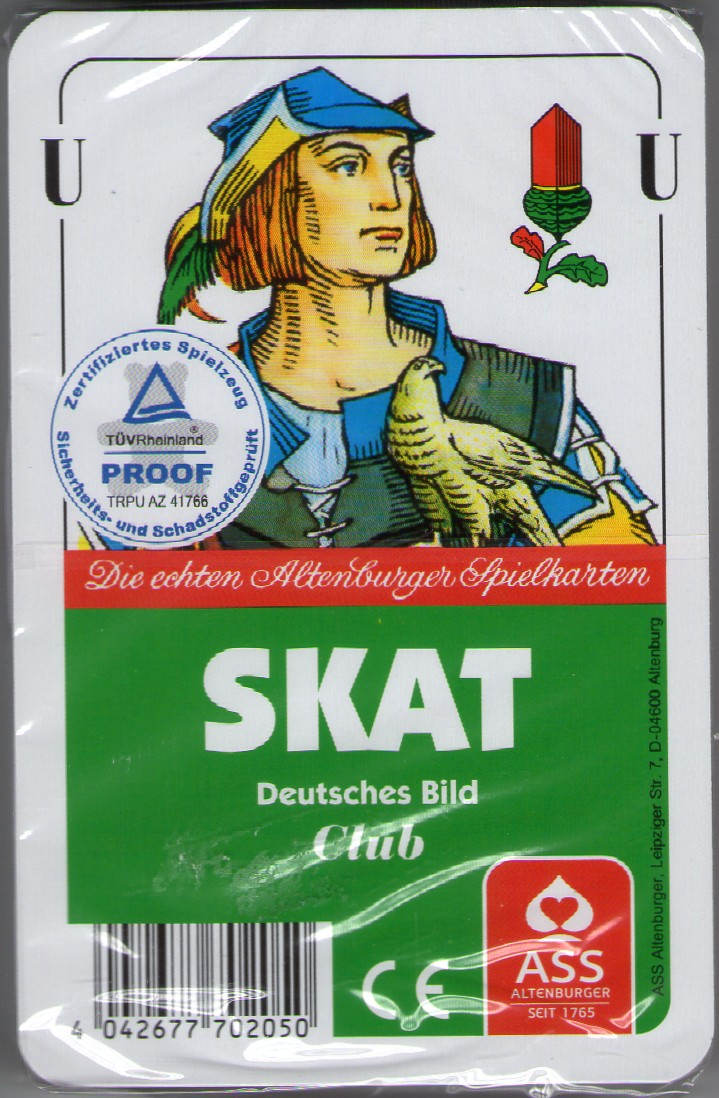
- Origin: Germany
- Alternative names: Passadewitz, Bassarowitz, Passarowitz
- Family: Trick-avoidance, point-trick
- Players: 4
- Cards: 32
- Deck: French deck or German Skat pack
- Play: Clockwise
- Chance: Easy

Related games
- Hearts • Polignac

Bassadewitz is an old German card game for 4 players that is still played today. It is a member of the Hearts family of games.

== History ==
The game is also called Passadewitz, Bassarowitz, Passarowitz, Passorowiss or Bassarowiz. It is recorded as early as 1729 in a humorous poem, Das schöne Spiel Bassarowiz, which describes it as a "much vaunted game". It is first recorded in the 1811 in Hammer's die deutschen Kartenspiele and is still played as a family game in parts of German-speaking Europe. It is a member of the trick avoidance group of playing cards.

== Playing ==
Dealer puts up a pool of twelve counters and deals eight cards each from a 32-card pack of French or German playing cards ranking and counting as follows:

Ranks and card-point values of cards
German-suited cards	A/D	10	K	O	U	9	8	7
French-suited cards	A	10	K	Q	J	9	8	7
Value	11	10	4	3	2	–		

Eldest hand leads to the first trick and the winner of each trick leads to the next. Suit must be followed if possible. The trick is taken by the highest card of the suit led. There are no trumps.

== Scoring ==
Whoever takes the fewest card points wins 5 counters, second fewest 4, third fewest 3. Ties are settled in favour of the eldest player, but a player taking no tricks beats one who merely takes no card points.

A player winning every trick is paid 4 counters each by the others and a player taking 100 or more in card points, but failing to win every trick, pays 4 each to the other players. In these cases, the pool remains intact and the same dealer deals again, as also if all four take the same number of card points.

== Variant ==
The Ace may count 5 points instead of 11, and players adds 1 point per trick to their total of card points, which may be classified as the easiest form of playing the game

== Literature ==
- _ (1983). "Bassadewitz". In: Spielkartenfabrik Altenburg (publ.): Erweitertes Spielregelbüchlein aus Altenburg, Verlag Altenburger Spielkartenfabrik, Leipzig 1983, pp. 41ff
- Hammer, Paul (1811). Die deutschen Kartenspiele. Leipzig: Weygand.
- Bassadewitz. In: Meyers Großes Konversations-Lexikon. 6th edition. Vol. 2, Bibliographisches Institut, Leipzig/Vienna 1905, p. 430.
- Bassadewitz in Brockhaus' Konversationslexikon, 14th edition, 1894–1896, Vol. 2, p. 472
- Parlett, David (2008). The Penguin Book of Card Games. London: Penguin (2008). p. 157. ISBN 978-0-141-03787-5.
- Grupp, Claus D. Karten-spiele, Niederhausen: Falken (1975/1979), p. 47. ISBN 3-8068-2001-5.
- Heinrici, Christian Friedrich (1732). Ernst-Schertzhaffte und Satyrische Gedichte: Mit Kupffern, Volume 3. Leipzig: Joh. Theod. Boetiiseel. The poem is dated 1729.
