= Labyrinth (card game) =

Patience card game

- A Patience game
- Origin: England
- Type: Blockade
- Deck: Single 52-card
- Odds of winning: 1 in 2

Labyrinth is a patience or card solitaire game which uses a pack of 52 playing cards. Despite the fact that the word labyrinth is synonymous with maze, this game is very different in its manner of play and dealing from the game of Maze, and should not be confused with it. Labyrinth does however have similar play to the game of Babette – both being blockades – and the spatial puzzle in which cards become available is also reminiscent of Crazy Quilt.

== History ==
Labyrinth is first described in 1905 by "Tarbart". It has since appeared sporadically in British compendia right up to 2014, but Alphonse Moyse (1950) is the only American author to include it in a publication.

== Rules ==
The player first takes the four Aces out of the pack and lays them down as the foundations. Then eight cards are laid in a row below these four cards.

The cards on this row can be built on the foundations up by suit to Kings. Any gap is immediately filled by a card from the stock. Once no more moves can be made, a new row of eight cards is formed. However, once any card leaves the second row to the foundations, it is not filled; filling gaps by new cards only applies to the first row.

Only cards on the top and bottom rows are available and when a card on the bottom row is removed, the card above it is released and can be played. The same goes for a card which is below a card from the top row when that card is removed, when the player decides to fill the gap later or when the stock runs out.

As new rows are formed, chances are that there are gaps in the in-between rows except the top. These "holes" give the impression of a labyrinth, hence the name.

The dealing of new rows, putting cards to the foundations, and filling any gaps on the first row continues until the stock runs out. When the player gets stuck after this point, he can draw any card from the other rows as a last resort.

The patience is out when all cards are built onto the foundations.

== See also ==
- Babette
- List of patiences and card solitaires
- Glossary of patience and solitaire terms

== Literature ==
- _ (2014). The Card Game Bible. London: Octopus.
- Moyse, Alphonse (1950). 150 Ways to Play Solitaire. Cincinnati: USPCC.
- Parlett, David (1979). The Penguin Book of Patience. London: Penguin. ISBN 978-0-7139-1193-0
- "Tarbart" (1905). Games of Patience. 2nd edn. London : De La Rue.
