= George Swinnerton Parker =

American game designer (1866–1952)

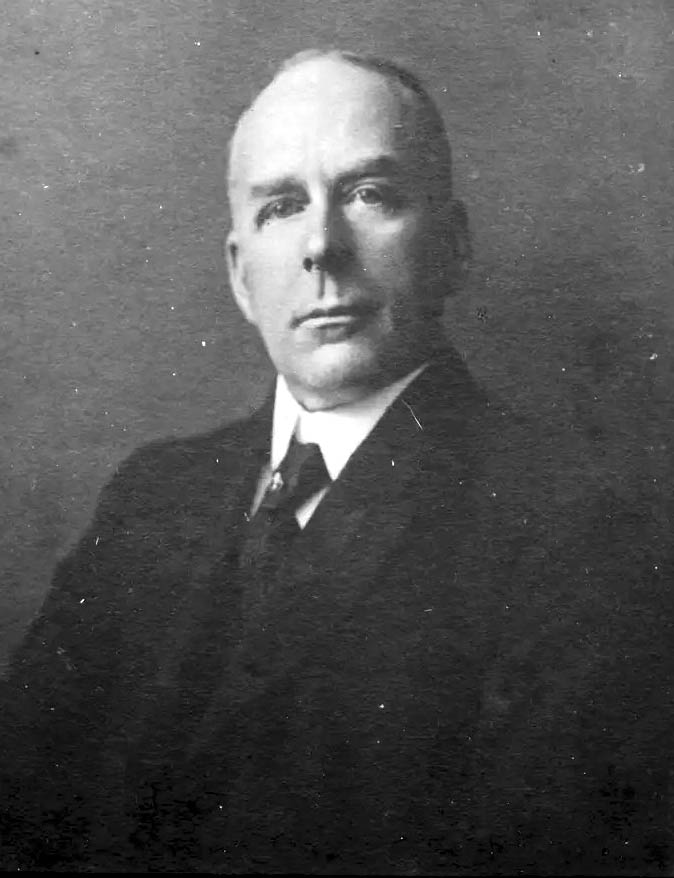
- Born: December 12, 1866; Salem, Massachusetts, US
- Died: September 26, 1952 (aged 85); Boston, Massachusetts, US
- Occupations: Game designer, company founder
- Known for: Founder of Geo S. Parker Co. and Parker Brothers

George Swinnerton Parker (December 12, 1866 – September 26, 1952) was an American game designer and businessman who founded Geo. S. Parker Co. and Parker Brothers.

== Life and career ==
Parker was born in Salem, Massachusetts.

Parker's philosophy deviated from the prevalent theme of board game design; he believed that games should be played for enjoyment and did not need to emphasize morals and values. He published his first game, Banking, in 1883 at the age of 16. Banking is a card game in which players borrowed money from the bank and tried to generate wealth by guessing how well they could do. The game included 160 cards which foretold their failures or successes. The game was so popular among family and friends that his brother, Charles Parker urged him to publish it. George approached two Boston publishers with the idea, but was unsuccessful. Not discouraged, he spent $40 to make 500 sets of Banking. He eventually sold all but two dozen copies, making a profit of $100.

Parker founded his game company, initially called the Geo. S. Parker & Company, in his town of residence Medford, Massachusetts, in 1883, and followed it up with two other games: Famous Men, another card game, and Baker's Dozen, a board game designed by one of his teachers. In 1885, his family moved to Salem, where he published four more card games: The Dickens Game, Ivanhoe, Speculation, and Great Battlefields. When George's brother Charles joined the business in 1888, the company's name was changed to its more familiar form. In 1898, a third brother, Edward H. Parker, joined the company. For many years, George designed most of the games himself, and wrote all the rules. Many games were based on important events of the day: Klondike was based on the Alaskan gold rush, and War in Cuba on the impending Spanish–American War.

The game industry was growing, and the company was becoming very profitable. In 1906, Parker Brothers published the game Rook, their most successful card game to this day, and it quickly became the best-selling game in the country. During the Great Depression, a time when many companies were going out of business, Parker Brothers released a new board game called Monopoly. Although the company had originally rejected the game in 1934, they decided to publish it the next year. It was an instant success, and the company had difficulty keeping up with demand. The company continued to grow throughout the next several decades, producing such lasting games as Clue, Risk, and Sorry!. The Clue murder mystery game was based on the house in Peterborough, New Hampshire, that George Parker and his wife Grace lived in.

Parker died in Boston and was buried in Harmony Grove Cemetery in Salem.
