= Pas de Deux (solitaire) =

Card game with two decks of playing cards

Pas de Deux is a solitaire card game which is played with two decks of playing cards. It is named after the Ballet term pas de deux ("dance for two"). It is a difficult game to win.

It has been implemented in the computer program PySol, where it is categorized as a Montana type of solitaire game. It is also included in several other software programs that contain collections of solitaire games.

== Rules ==
Pas du Deux is played with two decks which are kept separated. One is shuffled and laid out, all cards face up, in a tableau of four rows of thirteen columns each. The other deck is shuffled and used as a talon (or stock).

The object of this game is to arrange all of the cards from Ace to King (left to right) with Clubs at the top, followed by Spades, Hearts, and Diamonds.

The stock is dealt one card at a time. Whichever card is dealt from the stock represents the single card in the tableau that can be moved horizontally or vertically, swapping with any card along those axes. Only one redeal is allowed, thus giving two passes through the deck.

== External sources ==
- "Pas de Deux". PySol Solitaire

== See also ==
- Montana
- List of solitaire games
- Glossary of solitaire terms
