= Chicago (poker card game) =

Poker card game

The game was allegedly invented in an underground poker club at Hammarbykajen, Stockholm in Sweden owned by the Russian mafia. The game is a variation of the Swedish card game, Fem-kort. The poker-related card game called Chicago is one of the most popular card games in Finland today. Relying on the keeping of score instead of the placing of bets, it is suitable even for environments such as schools, where gambling is often prohibited. The game exists in countless versions, so here a (somewhat arbitrarily chosen) basic game will be followed by a number of possible variations.

== Hand scores ==
The backbone of the game is that each hand has its own point value, as given in this table:

- One pair - 1 point.
- Two pair - 2 points.
- Three of a kind - 3 points.
- Straight - 4 points.
- Flush - 5 points.
- Full house - 6 points.
- Four of a kind - 7 points (but see Variations below).
- Straight flush - 8 points (but see Variations below).
- Royal Flush - 20 points (but see Variations below).

== Basic rules ==
Chicago is played with a standard 52-card deck. Each player is dealt five cards. The objective is to reach, or exceed, 52 points.

=== Exchanges and hand scoring ===
The players are allowed to exchange any number of their cards. If a player chooses to exchange one card only, he may choose "one up", meaning that he is dealt one card faced up, which he can either accept, or instead take the next card unseen. After the exchanges, the player with the best hand (and only one player) gets points for his hand. Then follows another round of exchanges, but no hand scoring.

=== The game ===
Now, the first player begins by playing one card. Ordinary whist rules apply, but the players keep their cards collected by themselves. The player who wins the last trick gets 5 points. Also, the player with the best hand (whether it is the same player or not) gets points for his hand. After achieving 42 points a player is no longer permitted to trade cards as they normally would. Instead, they are dealt 6 cards at the beginning of the game and must discard one before the first scoring round. No further exchanges are permitted.

=== Chicago ===
Any player can choose to play Chicago at any time. In this case, he pledges himself to win all the tricks of the game. If he does, then he is awarded 15 points, but if he fails, the penalty is 15 points.

=== Blind Chicago ===
In addition to the conventional Chicago mentioned above, a player may also elect to pull a Blind Chicago. As with the standard Chicago, during a Blind Chicago a player also pledges to win all the tricks - however he announces his intention to do so before having ever seen his cards. In other words, a Blind Chicago can only be announced immediately after the last card leaves the dealer's hand. If he succeeds, a player is rewarded 30 points, with 20 deducted in the event of failure. If a Blind Chicago is announced, no players are awarded points for their poker hands in any of the phases. The player attempting the Blind Chicago may trade as he normally would. Also note that if a player succeeds in completing the Blind Chicago on a deuce, he is awarded 60 points - an automatic game win.

== Variations ==
- Sometimes, a player given five cards below ten (either inclusive or exclusive - must be decided before game starts) is allowed to replace them before the exchanges begin.
- Some play with 3 exchanges instead of 2. Then of course, scoring for hands will be made after both the first and the second exchange.
- Some do not use the "one up" rule.
- Often, a game will require that a player declare "Chicago" before they can win the game. The declaration is accepted regardless of whether one wins or loses the 5 tricks.
- Often, one awards 8 for Four of a kind instead of 7, 11 for Straight flush instead of 7 and a win for a Royal flush instead of 20.
- Often, one wants to give higher rewards than 7 or 8 points for four of a kind and straight flush respectively. There are several ways to achieve this, most notably by elevating the player immediately to 52 points, or lowering either all players or one player of the holder's choice to 0 points, or a combination of these. Some also separate the royal flush from the straight flush, awarding 9 points for a royal flush. Holding a royal flush usually means immediate victory.
- The confusion is great as to what scores are appointed in the case of Chicago. Some will argue that no player will get any points at all besides the +15 or -15, whilst others will allow other points to be awarded. The +5 for the game, however, can never be stacked with the +15 for Chicago. Yet another variation is to award +13/-13 points for Chicago and the declaring player gets to go first. In that variation it is forbidden to declare Chicago unless the player has reached 13 points, ruling out the possibility of a negative score.
- Some prescribe that any player with 45 points or more is not allowed to replace any cards.
- Some require that after (and not in the same hand as) a player reaches 52 points, he must win the game once more before he actually wins. This handles the possibility that more than one player reach 52 points in the same hand.
- Some award 10 points instead of 5 if the last trick is taken with a deuce. If this variant is employed, 30 points must also be awarded for a Chicago hand successfully ended with a deuce.
