= Gaps =

Card game

- A Patience game
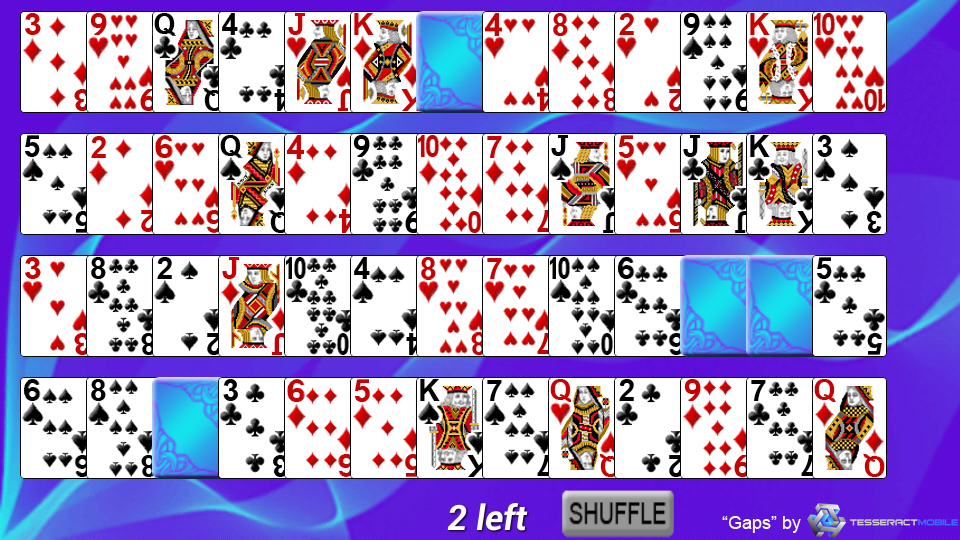
- Screenshot of Gaps
- Named variants: Addiction, Spades and Aces, Blue Moon, Clown Solitaire, Montana, Spaces, Vacancies
- Family: Non-Builder
- Deck: Single 52-card

Gaps is a member of the Montana group of Patience games, where the goal is to arrange all the cards in suit from Deuce (a Two card) to King.

Other solitaire games in this family include Spaces, Addiction, Vacancies, Clown Solitaire, Paganini, Montana itself, Red Moon, and Blue Moon. Sometimes these alternate names are used to refer to the same game.

== Rules ==
The cards are dealt into four rows of thirteen. The aces are removed and discarded from further play. The gaps that they leave behind are filled by cards that are the same suit and a rank higher than the card on the left of the gap. (For example, 4♣ can be placed beside 3♣.) However, any gap at the right of a King is considered dead and no card can fill it.

Any gap on the left hand side of the row should be placed by a deuce and the row should be built up by suit beside the deuce (i. e. 2-3-4-5, etc.). It is the discretion of the player on which suit would occupy which row.

When there are no more possible moves, the round is over. The cards that are not in order are gathered, making sure to leave any suit sequence (e.g., ♥2-3-4-5) behind. In some variations, the cards are then shuffled; in others, they are not. The cards are then redealt, making sure there is a gap in each row at the immediate right of each suit sequence or at the extreme left of the row if no suit sequence is formed in that row. There are only three rounds in the usual rules. But some variants allow four, and some have no limit.

The game is won when all 48 cards are arranged in numerical order and in suits, with the gaps of each row beside the Kings at the extreme right hand of the row. The probability of winning depends on which rules are followed. In variations where the cards are shuffled after each round and the rounds are limited to three, an experienced player will win perhaps one game in 20. In variations where the cards are not shuffled, but the limit of three rounds remains, one win in seven games may be expected. If the number of rounds is not limited, winning is just a matter of time when cards are shuffled; if they are not, winning is very likely although some rare positions cannot be won.

== Variants ==
Variants of Gaps include Addiction Solitare, which is played exactly as Gaps except that there are three reshuffles rather than the standard two, and the aces can be used in each reshuffle and redeal to create any gaps. In another variation, redeals are handled by omitting the Aces and leaving a gap in each row behind the last correctly positioned card.

Double Montana is a variant played with two decks, and is also called Big Paganini, or just Paganini. The cards are dealt in eight rows of 13 cards each. Aces are removed and placed at the left of each row. In some sub-variants, two redeals are allowed, in others, there are no redeals.

The solitaire game Maze is also somewhat related to this family.

== See also ==
- Pas de Deux (solitaire)
- Maze (solitaire)
- List of solitaires
- Glossary of solitaire
