= Babette (card game) =

Babette is a solitaire card game that uses two decks of playing cards shuffled together, with game play similar to that of the game Labyrinth.

== Rules ==
First, a row of eight cards are dealt. These eight cards will be bases for eight columns to be formed during the game.

The object of the game is to put one Ace and one King of each suit to become bases for foundations whenever available and built each by suit; Aces are built up while Kings are built down.

The cards in the tableau columns are available only to be built the foundations; there is no further building on the tableau. When a card is built on a foundation, the gap it leaves behind is not filled.

When there are no more cards to be moved from this first row, a new row of eight cards is dealt from the stock below or overlapping the previous row. Again, any gap that occurs is not filled. This is important because a card is deemed available for play when its lower edge is free, i.e. a gap occurs below that card. When no further moves are made, a new row of eight is formed, making sure (if cards are overlapping) that when a gap occurs before it, some space is left behind to indicate that gap has been made beforehand. Dealing of rows and removal of cards is repeated until the stock has run out.

After the stock has run out, one redeal is allowed. To do this, the columns are gathered left to right, and put over each other face up. The stock is turned face down and the process of dealing eight cards in a row and moving cards to the foundations is repeated.

The game ends when the stock has run out after the second redeal. The game is won when all the cards are moved to the foundations.

== Strategy ==
As indicated, the game can either be played with all the cards laid out or with the cards overlapping each other. As laying the cards out can be a space-waster, it is suggested to overlap the cards, covering each card half the way through and leave a gap (whenever it occurs) as it should when new cards are dealt; that way, when a gap occurs, it is easy to spot the available cards.

Furthermore, according to Peter Arnold (in his book Card Games for One), it is generally a bad idea to release a card that is above a gap before its duplicate is dealt, unless it is necessary to free up an important card. The game is lost, he said, when the wrong card has been played.

== See also ==
- Labyrinth
- List of solitaires
- Glossary of solitaire
