= Letzter Stich =

Card game

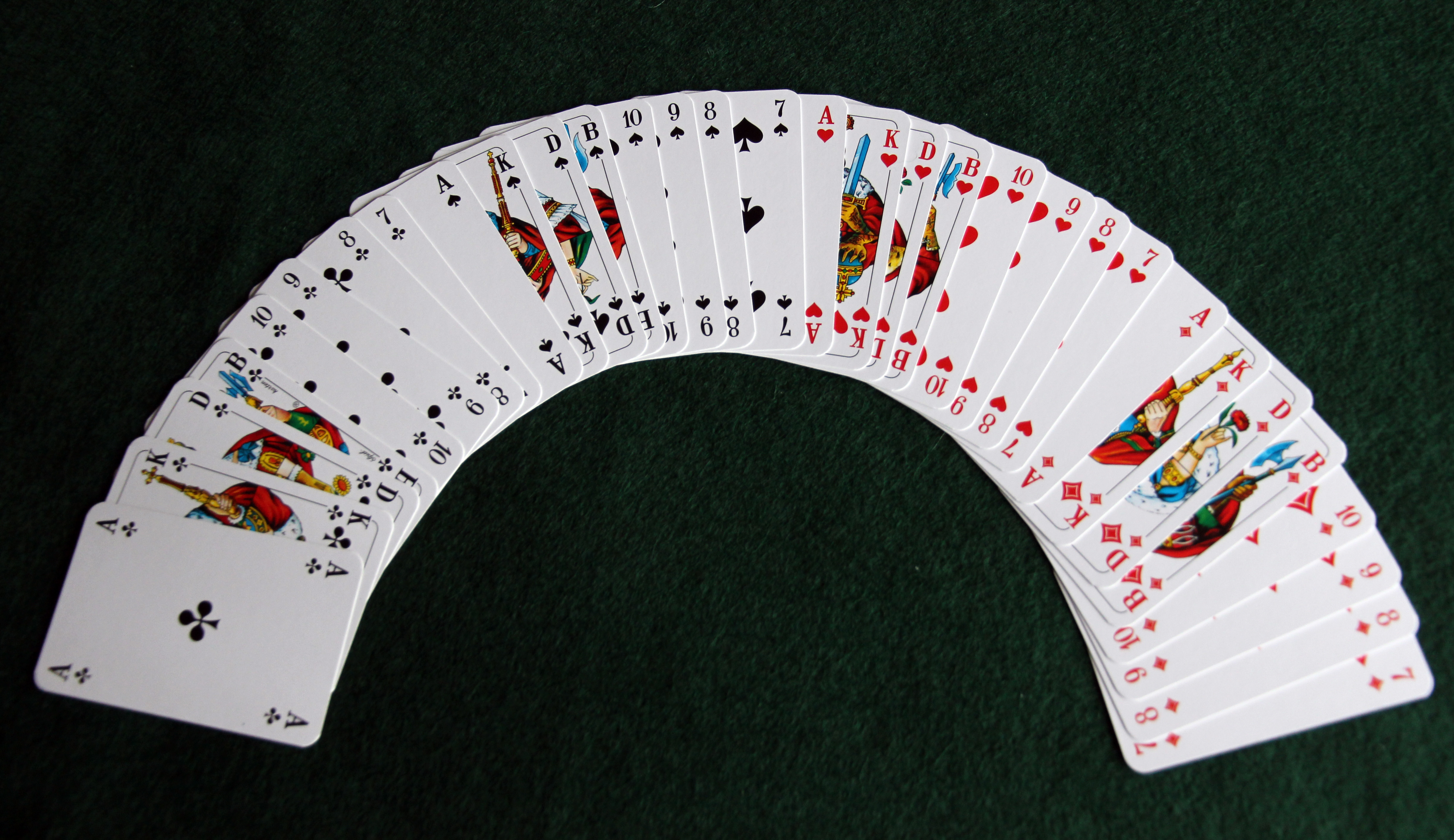
- French-suited 32-card pack used in Letzter Stich
- Origin: Germany
- Type: Plain-trick
- Family: Last Trick group
- Players: 3-6
- Age range: 6+
- Cards: 32
- Deck: Piquet
- Rank (high→low): A K Q J 10 9 8 7 or A 10 K Q J 9 8 7
- Play: Clockwise

Letzter Stich is a card game for 3 or 4 players in which the aim is solely to win the last trick. It originated in Germany and the names mean "last trick" respectively. It has been described as suitable for children, yet having a "surprising wealth of interesting game situations." It should not be confused with Letzter, a reverse game of greater complexity where the aim is to lose the last trick.

== History ==
The name of the game suggests a certain antiquity and in fact it is mentioned as early as 1707 as Letzte Stich in a book of poems and songs for various games. As Letzter Stich it appears in 1839 and may be related to Swedish Femkort. In 1967, Gööck describes it as being suitable for children, yet having a "surprising wealth of interesting game situations."

== Rules ==
These rules are based on Gööck, but Feder, Müller and Reichelt are virtually identical.

The aim is to win the last trick. The game is played with a French-suited Skat pack. Gööck and Müller cite an ace–ten ranking; Feder and Reichelt use the natural ranking. With three players, the Eights are removed and each player is dealt 8 cards; otherwise if four play, each is dealt 7 cards; if five play, 6 cards and if six play, 5 cards. Any remaining cards are put to one side and not used in the game.

Forehand leads any card to the first trick. There are no trumps. Players must follow suit. The winner of a trick leads to the next.

The winner of the last trick scores an agreed number of points e.g. 10, 20 or 50 and the first to reach a pre-agreed target is the overall winner.

== Literature ==
- Feder, Jan; Oker, Eugen (1980). Die schönsten Kartenspiele über 100 Variationen mit dem Skatblatt (in German) (2 ed.). Munich: Droemer Knaur. ISBN 978-3-426-07628-6. OCLC 615580208.
- Gööck, Roland (1967). Freude am Kartenspiel (in German). Gütersloh: Bertelsmann.
- Müller, Reiner F. (1994). Die bekanntesten Kartenspiele (in German). Rastatt. ISBN 978-3-8118-5856-5. OCLC 75555346.
- Reichelt, Hans (1987). Kartenspiele von Baccara bis Whist (in German). Wiesbaden. ISBN 978-3-88140-313-9. OCLC 74843595.
- von Schnifis, Johannes Martin (Laurentius) (1707). Lusus mirabiles orbis ludentis: mirantische Wunder-Spiel der Welt (in German and Latin). Kempten.
- Weber, Karl Julius (1839). Democritos oder hinterlassene Papiere eines lachenden Philosophen (in German). Vol. 6. Stuttgart: Hallberger.
