= Rook (card game) =

Trick-taking card game

- Publishers: Hasbro, Winning Moves Games USA
- Publication: 1906; 120 years ago
- Genres: Trick Taking Card Game
- Players: 2 to 6 players
- Setup time: 1 to 2 minutes
- Playing time: 10 to 60 minutes per round, Any number of rounds

Rook is a trick-taking game, usually played with a specialized deck of cards. Sometimes referred to as Christian cards or missionary cards, Rook playing cards were introduced by Parker Brothers in 1906 to provide an alternative to standard playing cards for those in the Puritan tradition, and those in Mennonite culture who considered the face cards in a regular deck inappropriate because of their association with gambling and cartomancy.

== Rook playing cards ==
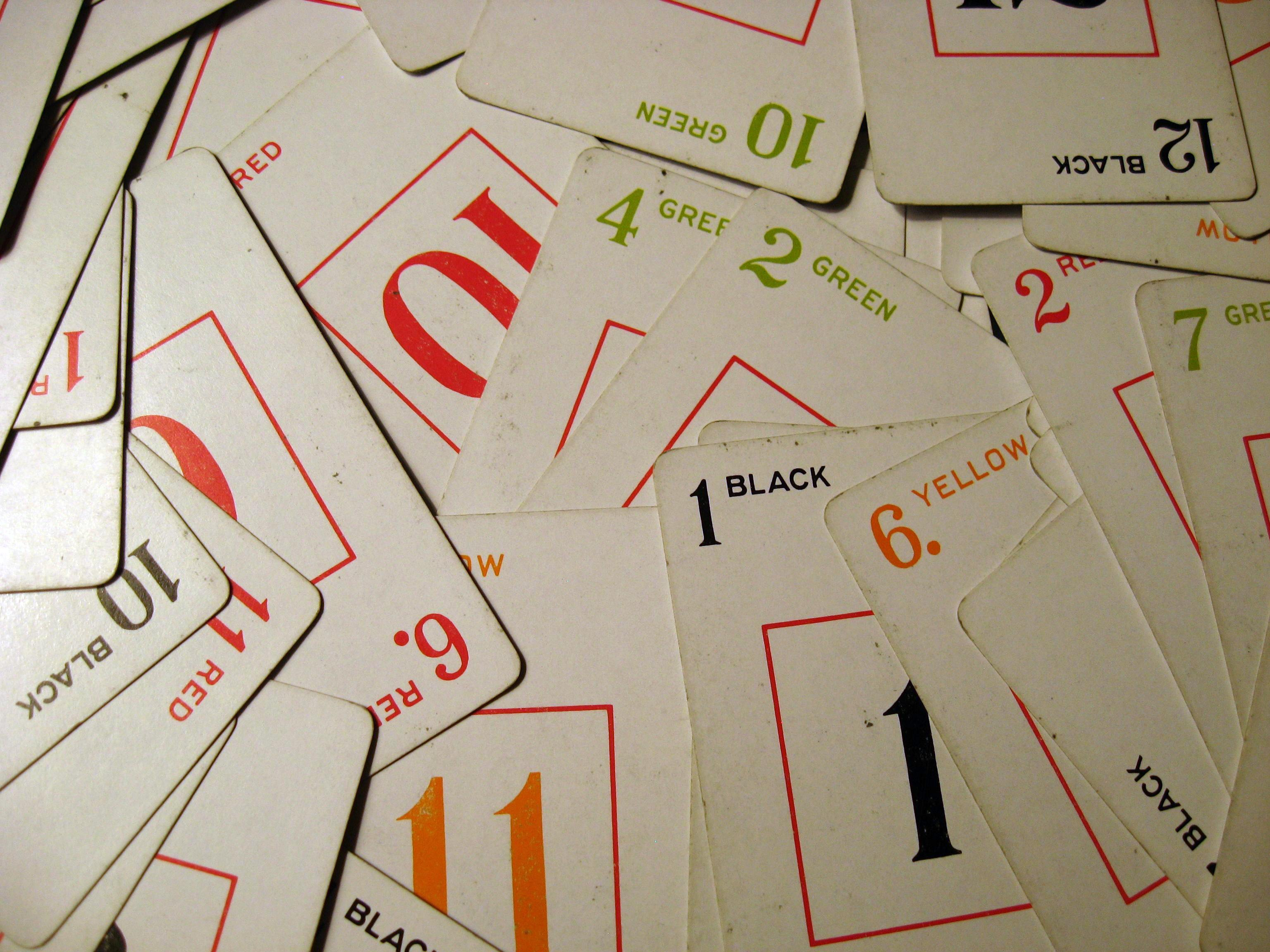
Rook cards

George S. Parker and his wife Grace sought to create a deck of cards that could be marketed to people with religious objections to the standard deck.

To accomplish this, George and Grace recast the standard deck of playing cards. They replaced the Ace with a "1" and the jack, queen, and king with "11", "12", and "13" cards, and added a "14" card as well. The hearts, spades, clubs, and diamonds were replaced with "suits" of colors: red, yellow, green, and black. With this new fifty-six-card deck, whist and most other common card games could be faithfully played.

Grace chose the name "Rook", and with the addition of a "Rook" card (serving as the Joker) the 57-card deck took its final shape.

== Official rules ==
The official rules for Tournament Rook (also known as Kentucky Discard) are as follows.

Four players are organized into two teams of two players each, sitting opposite each other. Players must keep their hands secret from all other players, including their teammates. The object of the game is to be the first team to reach 300 points by capturing cards with a point value in tricks. If both teams have over 300 points at the end of a round, the team with the higher point total wins.

Only certain cards have a point value. These are known as counters. Each 5 is worth 5 points, each 10 and 14 is worth 10 points, and the Rook Bird card is worth 20 points.

=== The deal ===
The 1s, 2s, 3s, and 4s are removed from the deck, and the Rook Bird card is added, for a total of 41 cards. The dealer shuffles and cuts the deck, then deals all of the cards, one at a time. After every player has received their first card, the dealer places one card face-down in the center of the table. This is repeated until there are five cards (the nest) in the middle of the table. The remaining cards are dealt normally.

=== Bidding ===
After the deal, players bid in increments of 5 points for the privilege of naming the trump suit. Bidding starts with the player to the left of the dealer and passes clockwise. The minimum bid is 70 points, and the maximum is 120 points (the number of points a team would make if they captured all the counters in the game). Players choosing not to increase the bid may pass to the next player. A player that has passed may not make another bid for the round. The high bidder adds the five cards of the nest to their hand, then lays any five cards to the side. The high bidder then names the trump suit. At any time during the bidding process, a player can call a redeal if they have no points in their hand.

=== Play ===
After the trump suit has been named, the player to the left of the dealer places any card of any suit face-up on the center of the table. Play proceeds clockwise, with each player playing one card face-up in turn. After each player has played, the player that played the highest card of the suit of the leading card takes all of the cards played, or "takes the trick".

A player must either follow suit (play a card of the leading suit) or play the Rook Bird card. Players with no cards of the leading suit may play any other card, including the Rook Bird card or a card of the trump suit. The highest card of the leading suit takes the trick, unless a trump card is played, in which case the highest trump card takes the trick.

The error of a player reneging, or failing to follow suit, may be corrected before the next trick is taken. If it is not discovered until later, the round ends, and the team that made the error loses a number of points equal to the bid, regardless of which team made the bid. The opponents score all the counters they captured before the error was discovered.

The person who takes the trick leads in the next trick. When a trick is taken, it is placed face-down in front of the player who took it. Tricks taken may not be reviewed by any player until the end of the round. The player that takes the last trick in a round captures the nest and scores any counters in it.

=== The Rook Bird card ===
The Rook Bird card may be played at any time, even if the player who holds it is able to follow suit, and is the only card that may be played this way.

The Rook Bird card counts as the highest card of the trump suit, regardless of which suit is chosen as trump. If the Rook Bird card is led, all other players must play a trump card, if they have one. The Rook Bird card must be played when the trump suit is led and the player holding the Rook Bird card cannot follow suit.

=== Scoring ===
When all possible tricks have been taken, each team adds the values of all counters captured by either of its members. If the bidding team has captured enough to meet or surpass their bid, they score points equal to their total; if not, they lose points equal to the amount of their bid. Regardless, the opposing team scores for their own captured counters.
