= Ninety-nine (trick-taking card game) =

Card game

Ninety-nine (aka Lloyd)
- Origin: United Kingdom
- Type: Trick-taking
- Players: 3
- Cards: 52 cards
- Deck: French
- Playing time: 30 min.
- Chance: Moderate

Related games
- Oh hell

Ninety-nine is a card game for 2, 3, or 4 players. It is a trick-taking game that can use ordinary French-suited cards. Ninety-nine was created in 1967 by David Parlett; his goal was to have a good 3-player trick-taking game with simple rules yet great room for strategy.

In ninety-nine, players bid for the number of tricks that they will take; players who gain exactly that number of tricks (no more or less) gain a significant bonus. One unusual feature of ninety-nine is that players bid by discarding three cards.

== Rules ==
=== Dealing ===
A round of ninety-nine begins with the deal of a shuffled deck. The two- and three-player versions of the game use only the 6, 7, 8, 9, 10, J, Q, K, A (ranked from lowest to highest) - note that 6 is the lowest rank, and that the 2 through 5 are not included in the deck. The four-player version of the game uses the entire 52-card deck (in which case the 2 is the lowest rank). Players are dealt the entire deck, one card at a time, with all cards face down. In the two-player version, the cards are dealt to the two players and also to a third pseudo-player called the "dummy". As a result, in the two- and three-player versions players are initially dealt 12 cards, while in the four-player version players are initially dealt 13 cards.

Trump suit is then determined. In the very first round of a game, there are no trumps. After that, the trump suit is determined by the number of players who made their bid the last round: Diamonds if 0, Spades if 1, Hearts if 2, and Clubs if 3. In the four-player version, if all four players make their bid in a round, the next round is played with no trumps.

=== Bidding ===
Each player then bids on the number of tricks they expect to take. Players bid by discarding any three cards in their hand; each suit is worth a certain number of tricks, and the total number bid by three cards determines the bid using the following code:

	Suit	Value	Mnemonic
♣	Clubs	3	Clubs have 3 bumps (top, left, right)
♥	Hearts	2	Hearts have 2 bumps on the top
♠	Spades	1	Spades have 1 point at the top
♦	Diamonds	0	Diamond outline looks like a zero

Thus, if a player discards a club and two diamonds, they have bid 3+0+0=3 tricks.

Normally, these discarded "bid" cards are placed face-down on the table, so that the other players will not know how many tricks that player is trying to take. However, a player who is very confident with his hand can also make two kinds of premium bids, which are made out loud to the other players: a declaration, where the bid cards will be shown face-up, or a revelation, where every one of the player's cards will be placed face up. Only one player can make a premium bid in a round; a revelation outbids a declaration, otherwise the Dealer's left has the highest priority. A declarer in position can reveal if a player behind them states intent to reveal.

In a 2-player game, both live players can declare, but neither player can reveal. Also, in the 2-player game, three cards are arbitrarily chosen from the dummy's hand and set aside as the dummy's bid (neither live player knows what the dummy has "bid").

=== Trick-taking ===
After the bidding has been completed, trick-taking begins. If playing the 2-player version, the "dummy's" cards other than the 3 bidding cards are first placed face-up and sorted by suit.

In 3- and 4-player versions, the player to the dealer's left plays the first card, and play continues clockwise. In the 2-player version, the non-dealer begins play.

Players must follow suit of the suit led if they can, else they can play any card; they need not beat a card even if they can. If a trump card is played, the highest-ranking trump card wins, else the highest-ranking card of the suit led wins. The winner of a trick leads to the next trick.

In the 2-player version, if a live player leads to a trick, then the other live player plays next, and the leading player then can choose any (legal) card from the dummy's hand. If the dummy wins a trick, the live player who last led chooses the dummy's card, the other live player plays next, and the player who last led plays from his own hand. Thus, the "dummy" is always first or last to play in the 2-player version.

=== Scoring a round ===
After all the cards have been played, the round is scored. Players earn one point for every trick they won, regardless of any other bonuses (or the lack of them). A player who acquired exactly the number of tricks they bid gains a bonus depending on the number of others who also made their bid.

If only one player succeeded, that player earns 30 points; if two succeeded, each earns 20 points; if three succeeded, each earns 10 points; and if all four succeeded in a 4-player game there is no bonus. A declaration adds 30 points (to the declarer if successful, to the others if not); a revelation is worth 60 points (to the declarer if successful, to the others if not).

Note that in the 3-player game, the maximum score in one round is ninety-nine (hence the name): 9 points for winning all nine tricks, 30 points for bidding 9 tricks and getting them (while no one else got their bid), and 60 points for a revelation.

In the 2-player version, the dummy is considered to have succeeded if the dummy wins fewer tricks than it bid, failed if it wins more tricks than it bid, and declared if it met exactly the number of bid tricks. If both live players declare and neither makes it, the dummy gets 60 points.

=== Games and matches ===
Ninety-nine can be played by simply playing until some player reaches a predetermined total over many rounds (e.g., 200 or 500); the player with the largest score wins. If playing as a 2-player game, the dummy's score is not tracked.

Parlett's recommending system for scoring games and matches is more intricate. He recommends that a game end when a player has reaches 100 points or more; any player who reaches or exceeds 100 points in that round also gains a 100-point game bonus, but they only get the game bonus if they succeed in that round (otherwise, they do not get the game bonus, though they get any other bonuses they are entitled to). A new game then starts. When one or more players wins 3 game bonuses, the totals across all games are totalled, and the player with the highest score wins.

=== Variants ===
Parlett's original rules, now referred to as the "classic" version, included a joker in the deal. This meant that (in the three-player game) there was one card remaining after the players were dealt their cards. This card was then turned over to indicate the trump suit for that deal (same suit as the turn-up). If the card turned over was the joker or a nine, then the hand was played as "no trumps". A player receiving the joker in their hand, treated it exactly as if it were the turn-up card, both for bidding and trick-taking purposes.

Another variant is Oxford Whist. This game is solely for three players and originated in Oxford Road, Bootle, which is how the name was derived. It is played in the same way as Ninety-nine as far as discarding 3 cards to determine the number of tricks required. This version differs in three ways:

All three discards always remain face down.

A maximum of 10 points is awarded to any player who wins the declared number of tricks.

The leftover cards (2s to 5s) are shuffled and placed in a face-down stock. Before each deal, the top card is turned over to determine trumps.

The game is over when the 'trump stock' is used up, i.e. 20 deals. The player with the highest score wins.

== Strategy ==
A key to playing ninety-nine well is discarding cards wisely to make a bid. In the two- and three-handed games, three cards must be discarded from twelve, resulting in 220 different options. Players must estimate what will happen to each of the cards they retain, and need to consider important factors such as what suit is trump and who will lead first. Players often want to get rid of "middle" cards, cards that are neither likely winners nor likely losers, and may want to "void" themselves of a suit since, once they have no card in a suit, they are free to play any other card if that suit is led.

One of the most common bids is three, and one of the next most common bids is zero. Diamonds and spades are more likely to be discarded as bid cards than other suits. There will be fewer in play and these suits are less valuable. Few clubs tend to be discarded, making high clubs likely winners.

If a hand is unbiddable and the cards needed to bid with are the cards needed for play, one strategy is to discard surprising cards such as all high cards of a given suit. The player doesn't intend to make the bid, and hopes to make it hard for anyone else to make their bids.

Often players want to gain the lead early and play their most uncertain cards first. If they win tricks, they can try to throw away some other strong cards. If the uncertain cards lose, they can try to pick up tricks with stronger cards.
