= Agram (card game) =

Card game from Niger

Agram is a popular trick-taking game within the last trick group. Agram originates from Niger and is related to card games in other regions of the world, including Spar or Sipa in Ghana and West Africa, and a variant Sink-Sink. In Cameroon it is called Fapfap.

Agram is typically played with two to four people; however, it can be played with up to five (as there are only 35 cards in the deck and each player receives 6 cards, five players is the maximum). Agram is an unusual trick game in that the winner of the last trick in the round, wins the round.

== Rules ==
=== Setup ===
Agram uses the Aces, 10, 9, 8, 7, 6, 5, 4, and 2 of each suit of the deck. The ace of spades is removed from the deck. The ace of spades is commonly referred to as the "Chief." The remaining 35 cards are shuffled and placed into a deck.

=== Dealing ===
Each player is dealt six cards in two sets of three cards by the dealer.

=== Play ===
The player to the left of the dealer leads with a card of their choice. The player to their left then follows with their card. If possible they must follow suit; however, if they are unable to, they may play a card of any suit. If the card played does not belong to the original suit, it has no value. After this player plays a card the remaining players each play a card, staying in order. The player who has the highest card of the original suit (suit of the leading card of the round) wins the trick. The player who wins the trick leads with a card for the next trick, and play continues to the left of the leader.

=== Scoring ===
The player who wins the sixth/final trick wins the round. There is no convention as to how many rounds are played to decide the winner.

== Variations ==
=== Sink-Sink ===
Sink-Sink is commonly played in Niger. What distinguishes it from Agram is that each player receives five cards instead of six. These cards are dealt in one set of three and another of two.

=== Agram (Mali) ===
Agram is played slightly differently in Mali. Only 31 cards are used: the Ace (not Ace of Spades), King, Queen, Jack, 10, 9, 8, 7. Five cards are dealt (as in Sink-Sink) and the game is played in the same way. However, there is one main difference, the ranking of the cards is very unusual. The ranking is as follows: A, K, 10, Q, 9, 8, J, 7.

== Bibliography ==
- Hargrave, Catherine Perry (2000). A history of playing cards and a bibliography of cards and gaming (3rd ed.). Mineola, N.Y.: Dover. ISBN 0-486-41236-9.
