= Trump (card games) =

Playing card with an elevated rank

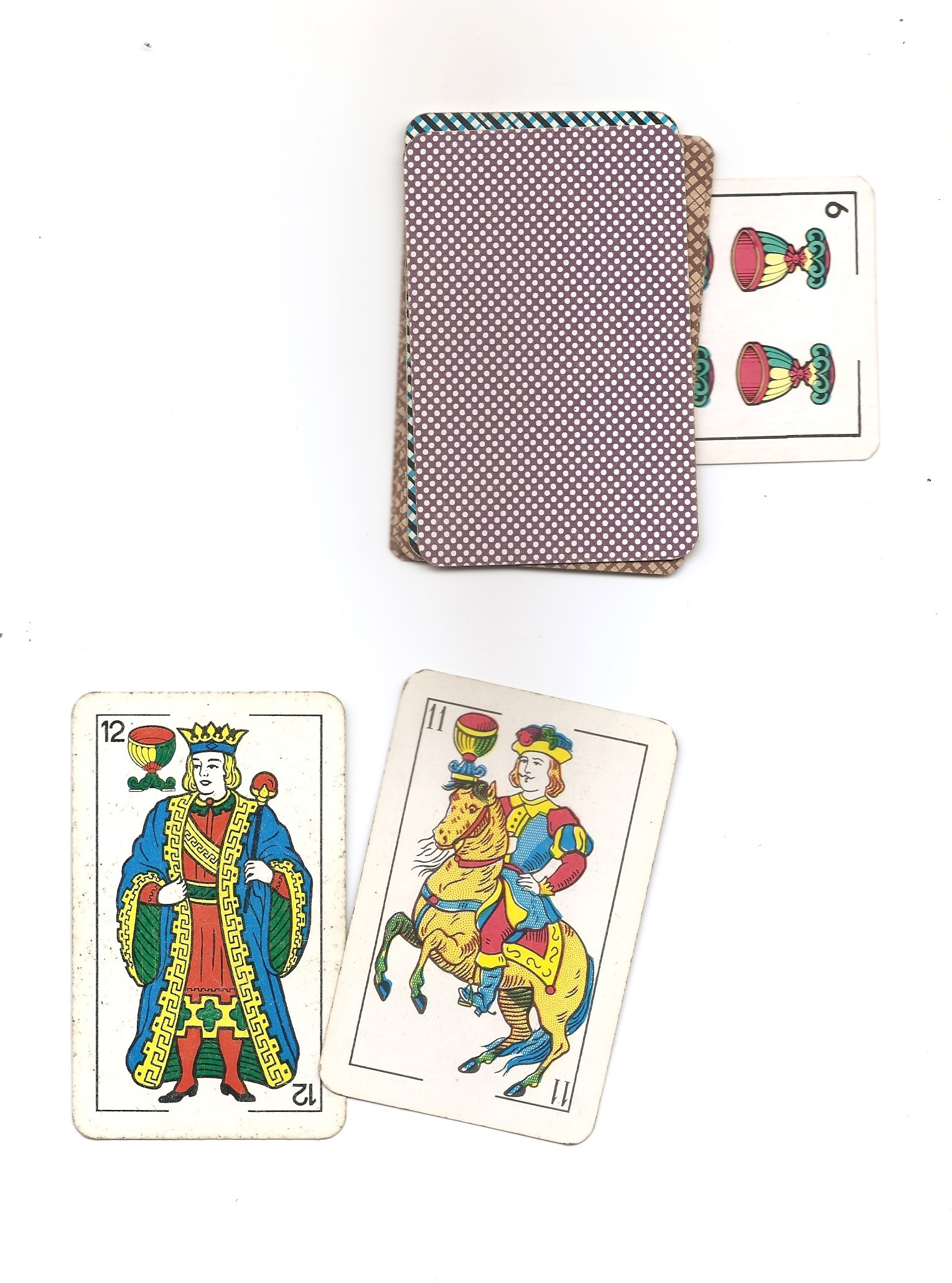
A 6 of cups is tucked under the deck in a game of Brisca, to show that cups is the trump suit.

A trump is a playing card which is elevated above its usual rank in trick-taking games. Typically an entire suit is nominated as a trump suit; these cards then outrank all cards of plain (non-trump) suits. In other contexts, the terms trump card or to trump refers to any sort of action, authority or policy which automatically prevails over all others.

The introduction of trumps is one of only two major innovations to trick-taking games since they were invented, the other being the idea of bidding. Trump cards, initially called trionfi, first appeared with the advent of Tarot cards in which there is a separate, permanent trump suit comprising a number of picture cards. The first known example of such cards was ordered by the Duke of Milan around 1420 and included 16 trumps with images of Greek and Roman gods.

Around the same time that Tarot cards were invented with the purpose of adding a trump suit to the existing four suits, a similar concept arose in the game of Karnöffel. However, in this South German game played with an ordinary pack, some cards of a given suit had full trump powers, others were partial trumps and the 7s had a special role. These features have been retained in games of the Karnöffel family down to the present, but are never seen in Tarot games. Suits with these variable powers are thus called chosen suits or selected suits to distinguish them from trump suits.

== Etymology ==
The English word trump derives from trionfi, a type of 15th-century Italian playing cards, from the Latin triumphus "triumph, victory procession", ultimately (via Etruscan) from Greek θρίαμβος, the term for a hymn to Dionysus sung in processions in his honour.

Trionfi was the 15th-century card game for which tarot cards were designed. Trionfi were a fifth suit in the card game which acted as permanent trumps. Still, in the 15th century, the French game triomphe (Spanish triunfo) used four suits, one of which was randomly selected as trumps. It was this game that became extremely popular in Western Europe in the 16th century and is ancestral to many modern card games.

The English word is first documented in 1529, as the name of a card game which would develop into Ruff and Honours and ultimately Whist. In German, the term is attested as Triumph in 1541; the modern German spelling Trumpf is recorded from 1590. In French, triomphe remained the name of the game, while the trump suit was called atout, from à tout (as it were "all-in"). Some European languages (Hungarian, Greek) adopted the French term. Russian козырь kozyr' is of unknown etymology, possibly a loan from a Turkic source. Polish variously uses atut, trumf and kozera adopted from the French, German and Russian respectively.

== Role in card games ==
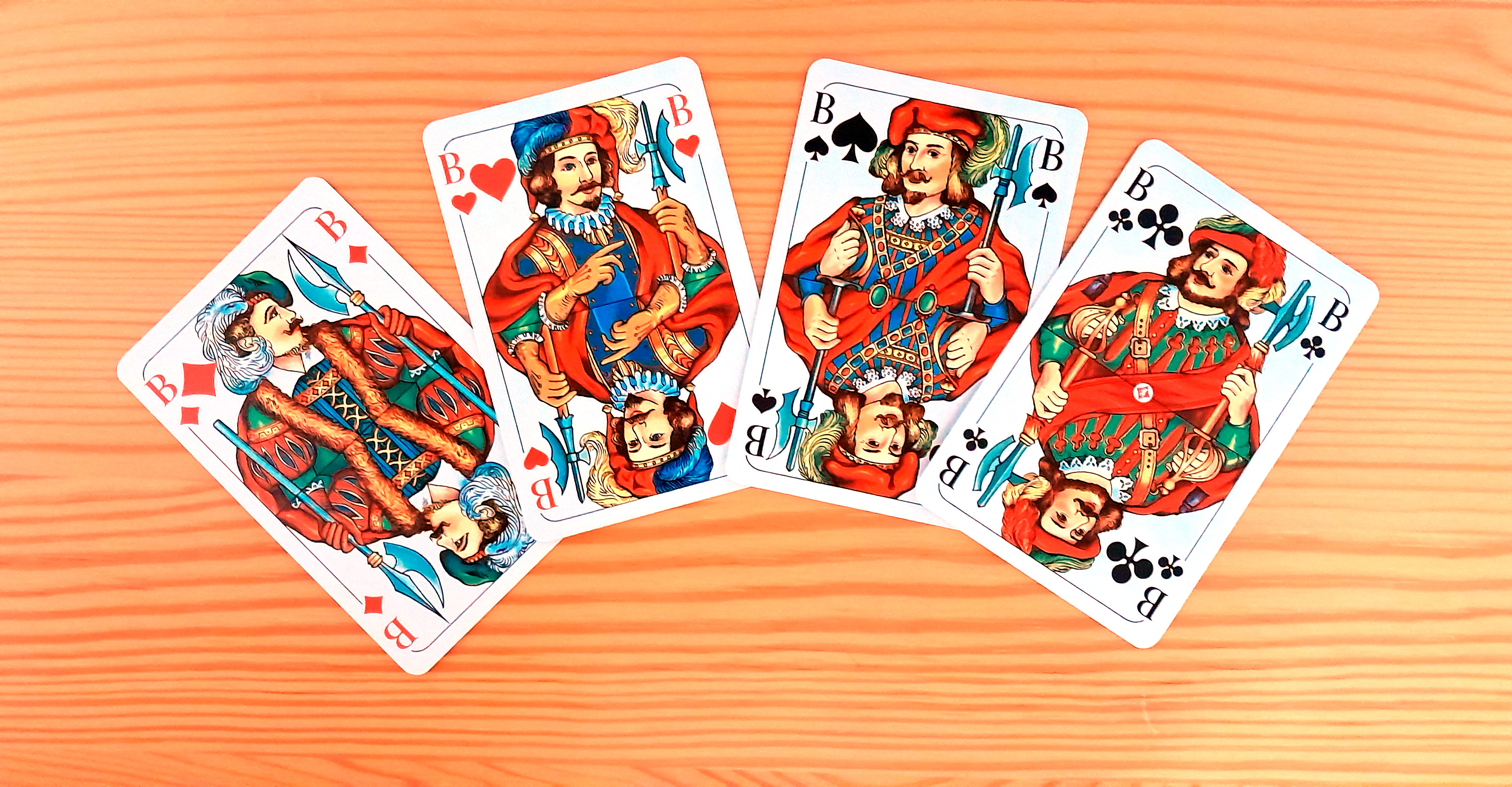
In the game of Skat, jacks act as permanent trumps, with the Jack of Clubs being the highest trump.

In most games, the relative rank of cards within a suit is the same in trump and plain suits, but they may sometimes differ, for example in Klaberjass, Euchre, or Eighty Points.

The trump suit may be fixed as in Spades, rotate on a fixed schedule or depend on the outcome of the previous hand as in Ninety-nine, be determined by drawing a card at random as in Bezique, by the last card dealt to a designated player as in Whist, by the first card played as in Nine Card Don, be chosen by a designated player as in Barbu, or players may bid for the right to select the trump suit as in contract bridge or Skat.

In most games trump cards cannot be played if the player has any cards of the suit led to the trick; the requirement to "follow suit" is of higher priority. In a few games, trumps can be played at any time. Playing the first trump to an already-started trick is known as trumping or ruffing; if another player were to play a higher trump, that would be an overruff or overtrump.

The tarot deck contains a fifth suit, known in gaming as the atouts or honours, which serves as a permanent trump suit in games played with the tarot deck. The suit consists of twenty-two cards, including a Fool which serves as the highest trump (in Central Europe) or excuses the players from following suit elsewhere. The usual rule of play in Tarot card games is that a player who cannot follow suit, must play a trump.

Due primarily to the prevalence of the trump in card games, the term used in Japan for the standard 52-card deck of playing cards is toranpu (トランプ), derived from the English word "trump".

== Chosen suits ==
In games of the Karnöffel family whose ancestor predated Tarot games, there are quasi-trump suits usually known as chosen suits or selected suits. These are characterised by the highest cards of the chosen suit or suits having full trump powers, intermediate-ranking cards having partial trump-like powers and some cards having no powers at all. Surviving examples include Swiss Kaiserspiel, German Bruus and Knüffeln and Danish Styrivolt.

== In Unicode ==
Unicode specifies twenty-one characters dedicated to the tarot trump suit. The exact style and rendering of these characters is left up to font, since tarot decks vary widely.

- U+1F0E0 🃠 PLAYING CARD FOOL
- U+1F0E1 🃡 PLAYING CARD TRUMP-1
- U+1F0E2 🃢 PLAYING CARD TRUMP-2
- U+1F0E3 🃣 PLAYING CARD TRUMP-3
- U+1F0E4 🃤 PLAYING CARD TRUMP-4
- U+1F0E5 🃥 PLAYING CARD TRUMP-5
- U+1F0E6 🃦 PLAYING CARD TRUMP-6
- U+1F0E7 🃧 PLAYING CARD TRUMP-7
- U+1F0E8 🃨 PLAYING CARD TRUMP-8
- U+1F0E9 🃩 PLAYING CARD TRUMP-9
- U+1F0EA 🃪 PLAYING CARD TRUMP-10
- U+1F0EB 🃫 PLAYING CARD TRUMP-11
- U+1F0EC 🃬 PLAYING CARD TRUMP-12
- U+1F0ED 🃭 PLAYING CARD TRUMP-13
- U+1F0EE 🃮 PLAYING CARD TRUMP-14
- U+1F0EF 🃯 PLAYING CARD TRUMP-15
- U+1F0F0 🃰 PLAYING CARD TRUMP-16
- U+1F0F1 🃱 PLAYING CARD TRUMP-17
- U+1F0F2 🃲 PLAYING CARD TRUMP-18
- U+1F0F3 🃳 PLAYING CARD TRUMP-19
- U+1F0F4 🃴 PLAYING CARD TRUMP-20
- U+1F0F5 🃵 PLAYING CARD TRUMP-21

== See also ==
- Top Trumps
- Trumps (card game)
- Major Arcana

== Bibliography ==
- Dummett, Sir Michael (1980). The Game of Tarot. London: Duckworth.
