= David Parlett =

English historian of board and card games (born 1939)

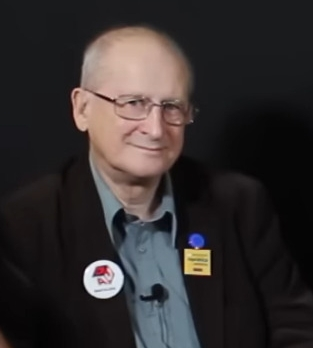
- Parlett in 2017
- Born: May 18, 1939 (age 87); London, England
- Occupations: Games scholar, historian
- Writing career
- Subjects: Card games, board games
- Notable works: The Oxford Dictionary of Card Games, The Penguin Book of Card Games

David Parlett (born 18 May 1939 in London) is a games scholar, historian, and translator from South London, who has studied both card games and board games. He is the president of the British Skat Association.

== Life ==
David Sidney Parlett was born in London on 18 May 1939 to Sidney Thomas Parlett and Eleanor May Parlett, née Nunan. He is one of three brothers. During the Second World War, Parlett lived in Barry, Glamorgan. He was educated at Battersea Grammar School and the University College of Wales in Aberystwyth. He has a BA in Modern Languages. Parlett was a technical writer with PR companies and later a freelance writer for Games & Puzzles magazine. He is married to Barbara and they have a son and a daughter.

== Works ==
His published works include many popular books on games such as Penguin Book of Card Games, as well as the more academic volumes The Oxford Guide to Card Games and The Oxford History of Board Games, both now out of print. Parlett has also invented many card games and board games. The most successful of these is Hare and Tortoise (1974). Its German edition was awarded Spiel des Jahres (Game of the Year) in 1979.

Parlett is a Quaker.

== Books ==
=== Games and gaming ===
- All the Best Card Games
- Anarquía y Otros Juegos Sociales de Cartas
- Botticelli and Beyond
- Card Games for Everyone
- Family Card Games
- Know the Game: Patience
- Original Card Games
- Solitaire: Aces Up and 399 other Card Games
- Teach Yourself Card Games
- Teach Yourself Card Games for Four
- Teach Yourself Card Games for One
- Teach Yourself Card Games for Three
- Teach Yourself Card Games for Two
- Teach Yourself Poker and Brag
- The Guinness Book of Word Games
- The Oxford Dictionary of Card Games
- The Oxford Guide to Card Games / A History of Card Games
- The Oxford History of Board Games reprinted as History of Board Games
- The Penguin Book of Card Games
- The Penguin Book of Patience
- The Penguin Book of Word Games
- The Penguin Encyclopedia of Card Games
- The Popular Dictionary of Card Games

=== Other subjects ===
- A Short Dictionary of Languages
- Dalcroze Today (translation of Marie-Laure Bachmann's work)
- Learning a Language Alone
- Selections from the Carmina Burana (translations)

== Games invented ==
=== Board games ===
Since 1974, David Parlett has published numerous games, including the following:

- Around the World in 80 Days (2016)
- Asterix: Das Kartenspiel (1990)
- Chicken Out! (2017)
- Die Wilden Kerle (The Wild Kids) (2017)
- Hare and Tortoise (1973)
- Katarenga (Colorado) (2017)
- LifeCards
- Metal Mickey's All Around the House Game (1982)
- Ninety-Nine (1974) / Four Seasons (2016)
- Pot Black: Snooker Dice (1980)
- Rainbow Junior Scrabble (1989)
- Roman Poker (2015)
- Shoulder to Shoulder (1975)
- Star Wars: Duell der Mächte (2015)
- Sushi Spiel (Chinese Take-Away)
- The Gnümies Party Game (2001)
- The Puzzle of Oz (2012)
- Zoo Party / 7Safari (2000) / Alles für die Katz

=== Card games ===
Parlett has invented more than 70 original card games that can be played with a standard deck of playing cards.

=== Solitaire games ===
- Archway
- Black Hole
- Gay Gordons
- Penguin
