= List of card games by number of cards =

This list arranges card games by the number of cards used.

Only games played with traditional European playing cards are listed. Those played with cards from other regions are not included, nor are proprietary card games since each game comes with a bespoke pack (separate lists in "See also" section).

Where two or more packs are listed, games may be predominantly played with just one pack as indicated at the relevant article. The composition is indicated in brackets thus: (suits x cards) e.g. (4 x AKQJT) means 4 suits each containing the Ace, King, Queen, Jack and Ten. The key to suits is: F = French-suited cards, G = German-suited cards, I = Italian-suited cards, Sp = Spanish-suited cards and Sw = Swiss-suited cards.

Games for dedicated packs should be added here: List of dedicated deck card games.

== Games played with classic packs ==
=== Games played with 16 cards ===
French (4 x AQJT) packs:

- Baśka
- Kop

=== Games played with 18 cards ===
French (4 x AKQJ + 2 Jokers):

- Liar’s Table

=== Games played with 20 cards ===
French (4 x AKQJT) or German (4 x AKOUT) packs:

- Bauernfangen (G)
- Bauernschnapsen (G)
- Dreierschnapsen (G)
- Short Schafkopf (G)
- Schnapsen (F or G)

=== Games played with 24 cards ===
German packs (4 x AKOUT9):

- Bierkopf
- German Solo (modern Hombre)
- Mucken with a shortened pack
- Short Schafkopf
- Sixty-Six

=== Games played with 28 cards ===
French packs (4 x AKQJT97):

- Skærvindsel

=== Games played with 32 cards ===
French (4 x AKQJT987) or German (4 x AKOUT987) packs:

- Bassadewitz
- Belote
- Bezique
- Bierkopf
- Blattla
- Bohemian Schneider
- Brusquembille
- Coinche
- Écarté
- Einwerfen
- Elfern
- Euchre
- Fingerkloppe
- Fünfzehnern
- German Schafkopf
- German Solo
- Grasobern
- Klaberjass
- Mau Mau
- Manille
- Mariage
- Mariáš
- Marjolet
- Mucken
- Officers' Skat
- Oma Skat
- Préférence
- Piquet
- Quodlibet
- Réunion
- Schafkopf (long pack)
- Schwimmen
- Sedma
- Sheepshead
- Siebenschräm
- Siebzehn und Vier
- Skat
- Tippen
- Toepen
- Ulti
- Wallachen
- Wendish Schafkopf

=== Games played with 33 cards ===
German (William Tell or Double German) packs (4 x AKOUT987 plus Weli):

- Bieten
- Perlaggen
- Watten

=== Games played with 36 cards ===
Games played with 36 cards may be of considerable antiquity as the standard German card pack reduced to 32 cards during the 19th century (see Dummett 1980). Several of these games are attempts to play the Tarot game of Grosstarock with standard French- or German-suited cards.

French (4 x AKQJT9876), German (4 x AKOUT9876) or Swiss (4x AKOUB9876) packs:

- Bauerntarock (G)
- Bavarian Tarock (G)
- Bräus (F)
- Brus (F)
- Brús (F)
- Bruus (F)
- Bura (F)
- Coeur d'Alene Solo (F)
- Denver Solo (F)
- Dobbm (G)
- Durak (F)
- Frog (F)
- German Tarok (G)
- Hindersche (F)
- Schieber (S)
- Knack (F)
- Marjapussi (F)
- Scharwenzel (F)
- Six-bid solo (F)
- Six-plus hold 'em (F)
- Skærvindsel (F)
- Straight Solo (F)
- Svängknack (F)
- Tapp (F)
- Trekort (F)
- Tschau Sepp (S)
- Viersche (F)
- Voormsi (F)

=== Games played with 40 cards ===
Italian (4 x RCF765432A), Spanish packs (4 x A3RCF76542) or shortened Tarock (Sküs XXI-IIII + I ♠♣ KQCJT ♥♦ KQCJA) packs:

- Bestia (I)
- Briscola (I)
- Lansquenet (I)
- L'Hombre (Sp)
- Mus (Sp)
- Primero (I or Sp)
- Quadrille (Sp)
- Scopa (I)
- Sette e mezzo (I)
- Tressette (I)
- Zwanzigerrufen (T)

=== Games played with 42 cards ===
Shortened Tarock pack (Skiz XXI-I ♣♠ KQCJT ♥♦ KQCJA):

- Hungarian Tarock

=== Games played with 48 cards ===
French (AKQJ98765432) or Swiss (KOUB98765432) packs of 48 cards:

- Kaiserspiel (S)
- Knüffeln (F)
- Styrivolt (F)

=== Games played with 48 cards (2 x 24) ===
French or German pack (2 packs each of 4 x AKOUT7):

- Binokel (G)
- Doppelkopf (F or G)
- Gaigel (G)
- Penuchle (Pinochle) (F)

=== Games played with 52 cards ===
French-suited packs (4 x AKQJT98765432):

- 3-2-5
- 3-5-8
- 500 Rum
- All fours
- Auction bridge
- Badugi
- Barbu
- Battle or battle royal
- Belle, Fluss and Einunddreißig
- Bingo
- Black lady
- Black Maria
- Blackjack
- Bluke
- Bonken
- Boston
- Botifarra
- Bourré
- Bridge
- Cassino
- Cheat
- Clag
- Colonel
- Conquian
- Costly colours
- Court piece
- Cribbage
- Cucumber
- Cuttle
- Egyptian Ratscrew
- Femkort
- Forty-fives
- German whist
- Gin rummy
- Golf
- Gong Zhu
- Hearts
- Hucklebuck
- Indian rummy
- Kachufool
- King
- Knockout whist
- Köpknack
- Lanterloo
- Liverpool rummy
- My ship sails
- Napoleon
- Ninety-nine
- Norseman's knock
- Oh hell
- Pedro
- Phat
- Pitch
- Pok Deng
- Poker
- Put
- Ristikontra
- Rödskägg
- Rummy
- Shelem
- Sheng ji
- Sixty-three
- Smear
- Spades
- Spit (card game)
- Tarneeb
- Staircase rummy
- Texas hold 'em
- Turkish king
- Teen patti
- Uno
- Vira
- Whist

=== Games played with 54 cards ===
Shortened Tarot/Tarock packs (Sküs XXI-I ♣♠KQCVT987 ♥♦ KQCV1234):

- Cego
- Dreierles
- Dreiertarock
- Husarln
- Illustrated Tarock
- Königrufen
- Kosakeln
- Neunzehnerrufen
- Point Tarock
- Strohmandeln
- Tapp Tarock

=== Games played with 58 cards ===
French (Zwicker) packs (4 x AKQJT98765432 + 6 Jokers)

- Zwicker

=== Games played with 62 cards ===
78-card Swiss 1JJ Tarot pack minus the 1-4 of Swords and Batons and 7-10 of Cups and Coins:

- Troggu

62-card Tarocco Bolognese pack

- Tarocchini

=== Games played with 66 cards ===
78-card French-suited tarot pack minus the 3 lowest cards of each suit:

- Droggn

=== Games played with 78 cards ===
Tarot/Tarock pack (Fool 21–1 ♣♠ KQCJT98765432A ♥♦ KQCJA23456789T):

- Danish Tarok
- French Tarot
- Großtarock
- Scarto
- Troccas

=== Games played with 97 cards ===
Minchiate pack (40 trumps, Fool and 4 suits of 14 cards):

- Minchiate

=== Games played with 104 cards ===
French packs (2 packs of 4 x AKQJT98765432):

- Spite and Malice

=== Games played with 108 cards ===
French pack (Canasta): 2 packs of 52 cards and 4 Jokers:

- Canasta

=== Games played with 110 cards ===
French packs (2 packs of 4 x AKQJT98765432 + 6 Jokers):

- Rommé

=== Games played with 312 cards ===
(6 packs of 52 cards)

- Baccara
- Blackjack

== See also ==
- List of dedicated deck card games
- Hanafuda games
- Kabufuda games
- Ganjifa games
- List of domino games
