= Rödskägg =

Swedish card game

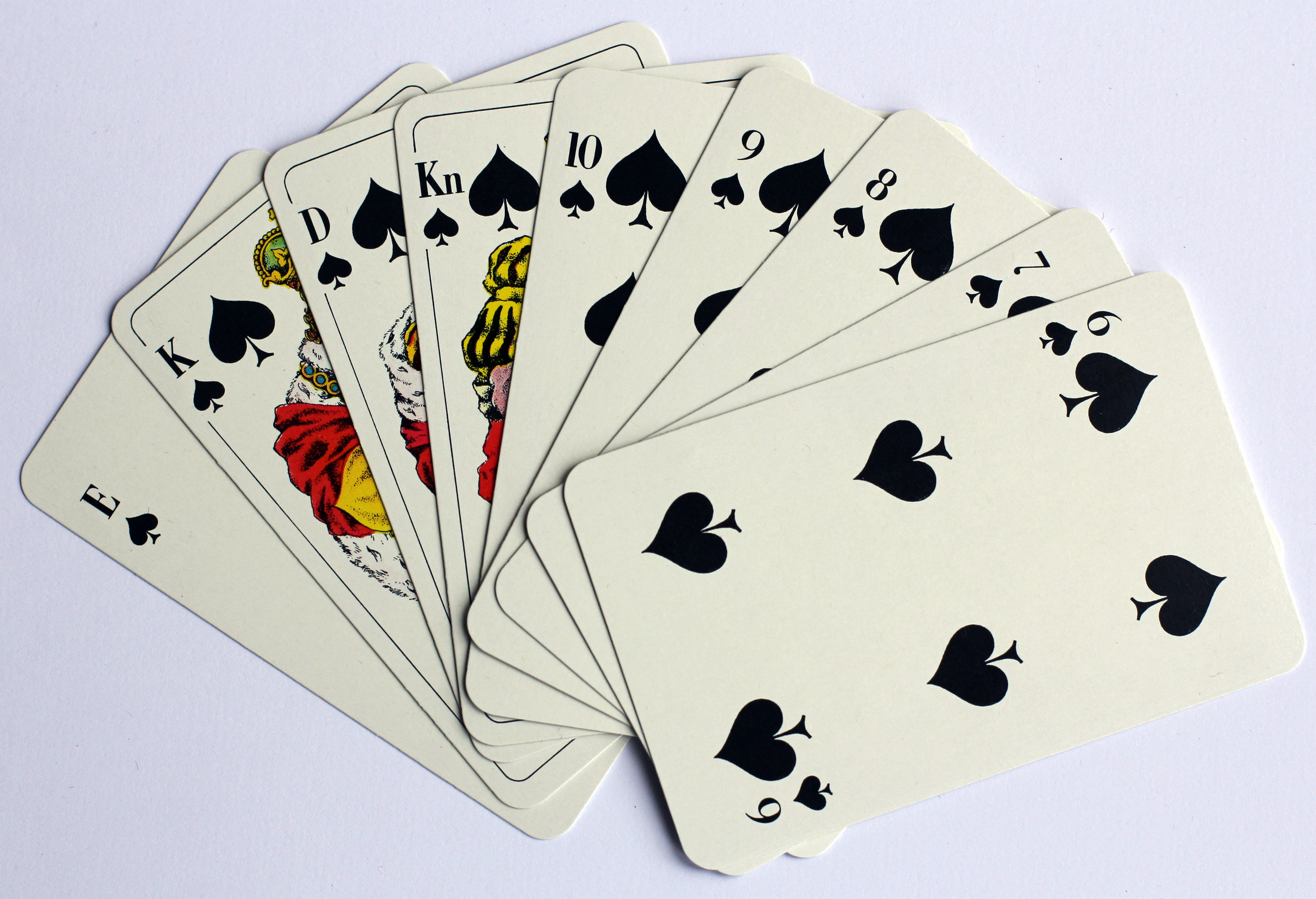
- The spades in a modern Swedish pattern pack
- Origin: Sweden
- Type: Plain-trick game
- Family: Rams group
- Players: 3-7
- Skills: Tactics
- Cards: 52
- Deck: Modern Swedish pattern, French-suited pack
- Rank (high→low): Natural (Ace high)
- Play: Clockwise

Related games
- Rams, Knack, Svängknack, Norseman's knock
- Players only fold in the last 2 tricks

Rödskägg ("redbeard") also called fem opp ("five up"), is a Swedish card game for three to seven players in which penalties are incurred for failing to follow certain rituals as well as for failing to take a declared number of tricks. Some rules describe Fem Opp as a variant of Rödskägg. It is an advanced and tactically demanding game and, of games played in Sweden, only Bridge and Poker are considered more difficult.

== History ==
Redbeard is a Swedish card game that was invented in the early 20th century and is mentioned in the literature as early as 1925. The name may have come from the notion that people with red beards were unreliable and although "no one believes in that legend anymore", the name has stuck.

== Cards ==
The game is played with a standard 52-card pack minus the Jokers. In Sweden the "modern Swedish" pattern pack is commonly used.

== Aim ==
Players start with 12 points each and the aim is to get down to zero by winning tricks while avoiding penalty points for failing to achieve a declared bid or failing to follow certain rituals. For each trick won, 1 point is deducted from a player's starting total of 12 points, but penalties of +5 or +6 points may be incurred during play.

== Rules ==
The dealer shuffles and cuts before dealing six cards to each player in two rounds each of three cards. A players who has not been dealt any picture cards (A K Q J) may ask the dealer for a fresh hand of cards until he receives one with a picture card or is satisfied with his hand.

There is then an auction in which players bid the number of tricks they think they can take, which can be from 0 to 5. In addition, there is the bid Redbeard, which is the highest and equates to a bid of 6 tricks. A player who bids Redbeard and takes all the tricks, automatically wins the whole game, but automatically loses and drops out of the game if he or she fails. The highest bidder is said to "have the game" and becomes the declarer.

The declarer leads to the first trick. Thereafter the trick winner leads to the next trick. There are no trumps, but suit must be followed and the highest card of the led suit wins the trick. When there are only two tricks remaining, the declarer must ask everyone if they want to "play on" or fold. Players who have at least one trick must play on; players who have no tricks may fold with no penalty, discarding their hand, face down. If they play on, they score -2 for each trick taken, but incur +6 penalty points if they remain trick-less. If the declarer forgets to ask players if they want to play on, play continues as if everyone had taken at least one trick; tricks are still worth -1 point and there is no penalty for failing to take none, but the declarer may, in some rules, incur a penalty for his omission.

Players must score exactly 0 points to win. If their score becomes negative, they must try to earn plus points to get back up to 0 points. They may do this by bidding a higher number of tricks than they expect to take. If two players reach 0 points during the same hand, they play a 'duel': a further hand between the two of them and the player winning the most tricks wins. Players must also notify the others when they are within 1 point of zero and when they reach zero.

=== Scoring ===
Players score −1 point for each trick they take. However, if the declarer (highest bidder) fails to take the exact number of tricks bid, +5 penalty points are incurred, although any tricks taken still score -1 point. So if the declarer had 7 points and bid 4 tricks but only took 3, the declarer's score goes up 5 points and down 3 giving a total of 9 points. A declarer who fails is said to "smoke".

The game includes a number of formalities or rituals that it is important to follow. If they are forgotten, the opponents have the right to point this out by tapping or knocking on the table. (Note: Or calling "Five up!" in some rules.) The transgressor is then penalized +5 or +6 penalty points. Some rules refer to these additional rules as the variant of Fem Opp; others include them in the rules for Rödskägg. The infractions that incur these penalty points vary, but may include:

- If anyone other than the dealer cuts the pack, the dealer is penalised 5 points. (Note: Some rules say the person who cut the pack is penalised.)
- Picking up one's cards before the dealer has uttered the phrase "Knock for cards and infractions". 5 point penalty.
- Forgetting to ask opponents if they want to continue playing with 2 tricks to go. 5 or 6 point penalty, as agreed.
- Failing to notify the others when within 1 point of zero or on zero. 6 point penalty.

The infractions must be picked up before the play starts or before the first card is led to the next trick as appropriate.

== Literature ==
- Glimne, Dan (2016). Kortspelshandboken [Card Game Manual] (3rd, extended ed.). Stockholm: Kangaroo. pp. 288–291. ISBN 978-91-7663-115-7.
- Lundell, Hans (2010). Familjens bästa spel för kort och turning [The Family's Best Game Book for Cards and Dice] (new ed.). Sundbyberg: Semic. pp. 48–50. ISBN 978-91-552-5564-0.
- Sundsten, Berndt; Jäger, Jan (2008). Första kortspelsboken [First Book of Card Games]. Stockholm: B. Wahlström. pp. 28–29. ISBN 978-91-32-15445-4.
- Lek med en kortlek [Play with a Pack of Cards]. Stockholm: B. Wahlström. 1993. pp. 63–65. ISBN 91-32-31783-2.
- Sevedsdotter, Åsa (1991). Lagt kort ligger [Played Cards Stay Played]. Stockholm: Info Books. pp. 54–55. ISBN 91-7003-097-9.
- Wessman, Vilhelm Eliel Viktor (1925). Samling av ord ur östsvenska folkmål. Vol. 2. Mercators tryckeri aktiebolag.
