= Lusti-Kartl'n =

Card game

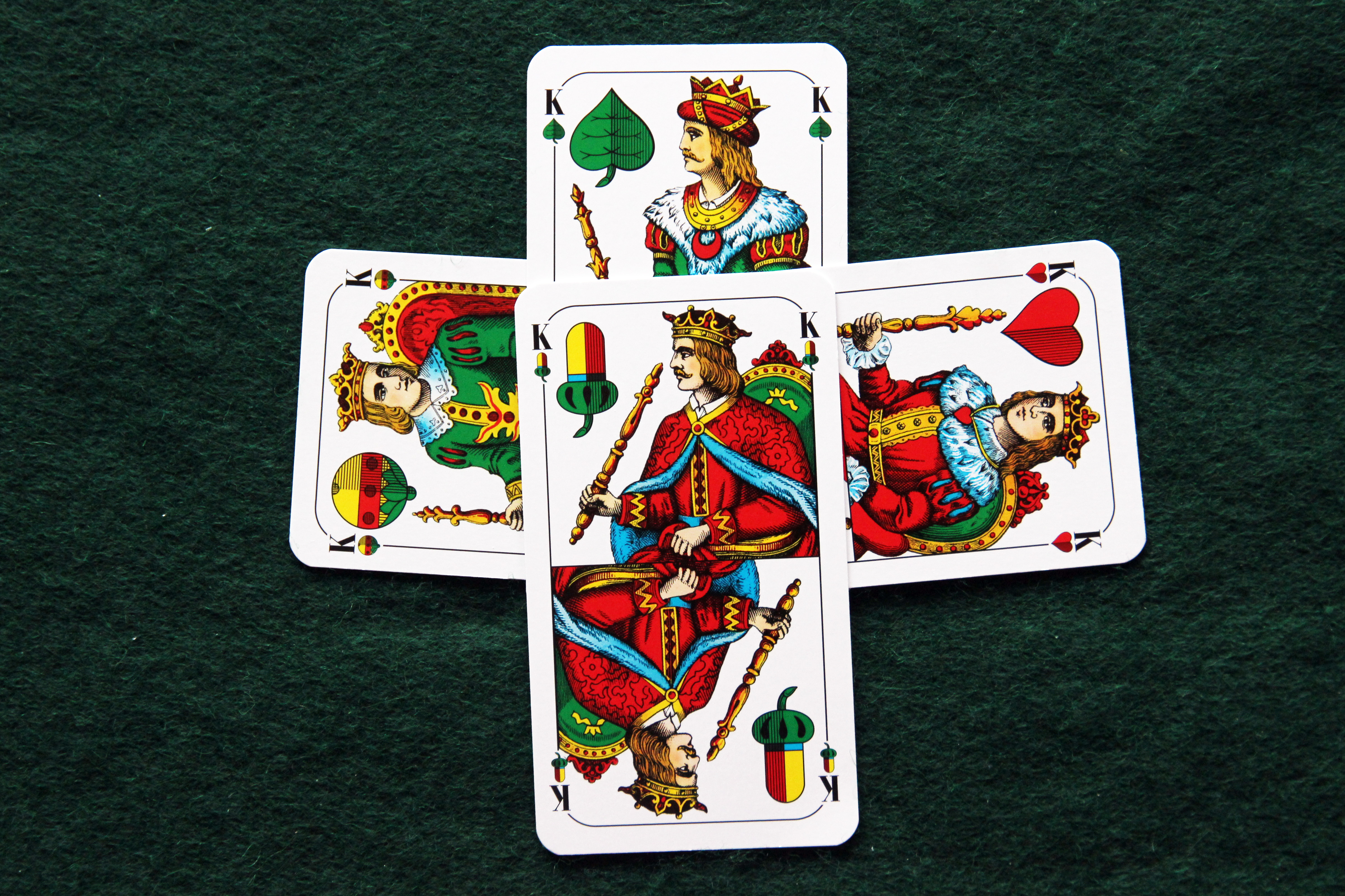
- The King of Acorns wins the trick
- Origin: Germany
- Alternative names: Lusti-Kartn
- Type: Point-trick
- Players: 4
- Cards: 32
- Deck: Bavarian-pattern pack
- Play: Clockwise
- Playing time: 2 min/hand

Related games
- Hola • Ristikontra • Sedma • Sedmice • Șeptică • Zsíros

Lusti-Kartl'n or Lusti-Kartn is a Bavarian trick-taking, card game for four players with an unusual rule for winning the tricks. Like the Czech game of Sedma, the winner of a trick is the last one to play a card of the same rank as the led card. Players form two teams of two and thus are able to smear their partner's tricks or play blanks if they think their opponents will win the trick. The only counters are the Aces and Tens, worth 10 points each, and there are 10 more points for the last trick. The aim is thus to win 50 or more points.

== Background ==
Lusti-Kartl'n is a point-trick game for 4 players in which the aim is to score 50 or more card points from a total of 90. Players form permanent teams of two, the partners sitting opposite one another. There are no trumps.

== Cards ==
Lusti-Kartl'n is played with 32 cards from a Bavarian pattern pack; the Sixes are left out. The Aces and Tens are worth 10 points each; the remaining cards are non-counters. As taking the last joke earns an additional 10 points, there are 90 points to play for.

== Playing ==
Unusually, tricks are won by the last card played that is of the same rank as the led card. So Sevens beat Sevens, Eights beat Eights, Obers beat Obers and so on. So if a Nine is led to the trick, the last Nine to be played to it wins. Players do not have to follow suit, nor do they have to follow rank. Any card may be played. Unlike, Sedma, there are no wild cards.

== Scoring ==
The team that scores over 50 card points wins. If playing for soft score, teams receive a game point, marked by a line (Strich), for each win. If playing for a hard score, they get a pre-agreed stake. If a team has not scored any card points, despite winning at least one conjuring trick, they 'stink' (stinken) and the winners score double. If a team fails to take any tricks at all they are unterm Tisch ohne Stich ("under the table without a trick") and the winners score triple. A Brand ("fire") attracts the highest score; if the trick consists of 4 cards of the same rank, it is a Brand and the game is immediately over. The team who won the Brand (i.e. by playing the last card to the trick) has won the game with 4 game points. Game is 11 points and, typically, the losers have to buy a Maß of beer.

== Literature ==
- Sirch, Walter (2008). Vom Alten zum Zwanzger - Bayerische Kartenspiele für Kinder und Erwachsene - neu entdeckt (in German). Bayerischer Trachtenverband.
