= Sedmice =

Card game

- A point-trick game in which tricks are won by matching cards
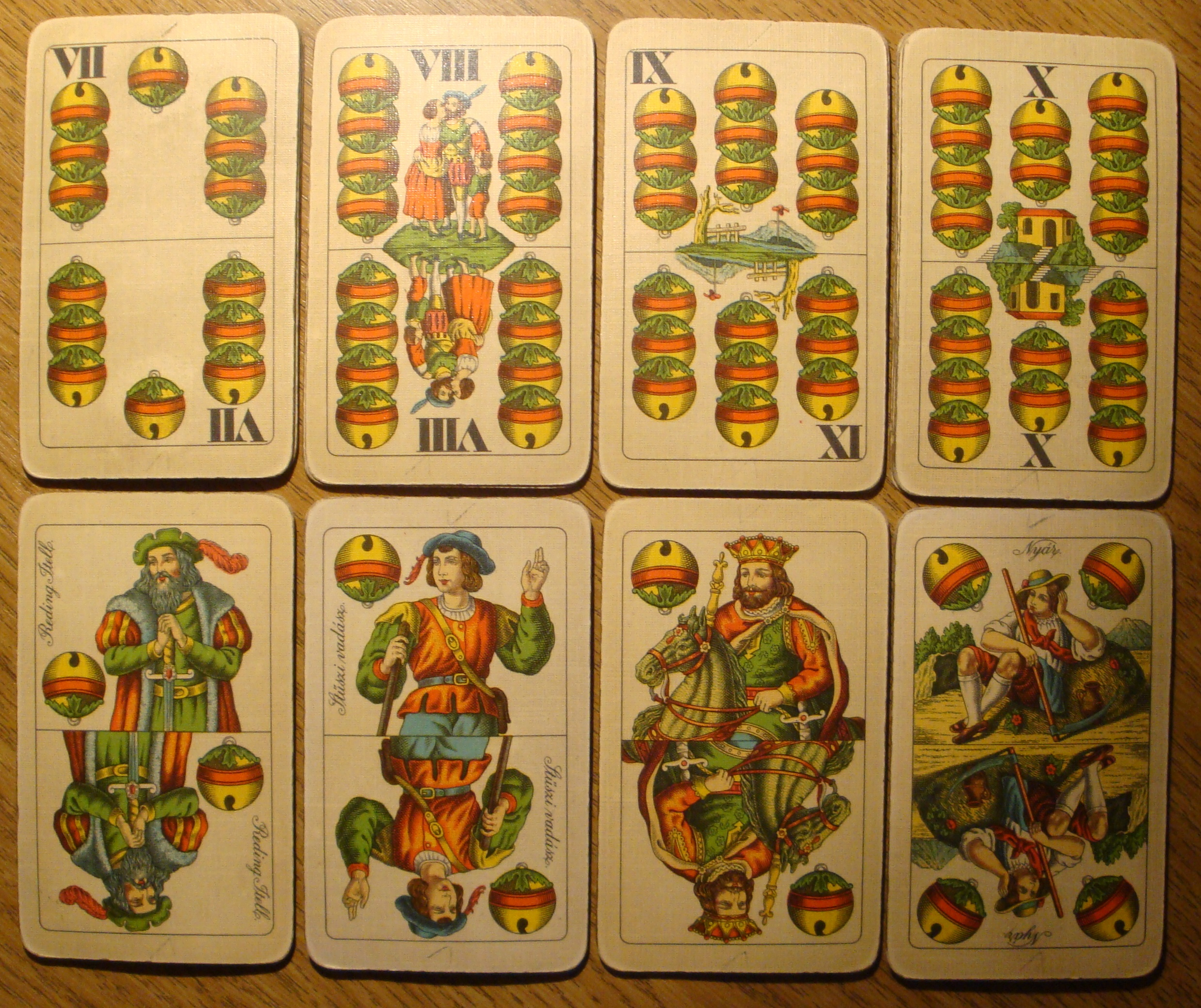
- The suit of Bells in Sedmica
- Origin: Bohemia
- Type: Point-trick
- Players: 2 or 2×2
- Skills: Strategy
- Cards: 32
- Deck: German-suited cards
- Playing time: 25 min.
- Chance: Medium

Related games
- Ristikontra • Hola • Lusti-Kartl'n • Sedma • Șeptică • Zsíros

Sedmice ("Seven") is a card game of the Sedma family played in the states of the former Yugoslavia. Like other games of this family, tricks are won by matching the led card in rank. In addition, the Sevens are wild, hence the name. In Croatia, the game is called Šuster.

== Overview ==
Two players can participate, but the optimal number is four players (in two pairs). The game is played clockwise. Each player is initially dealt 4 cards.

== Cards ==
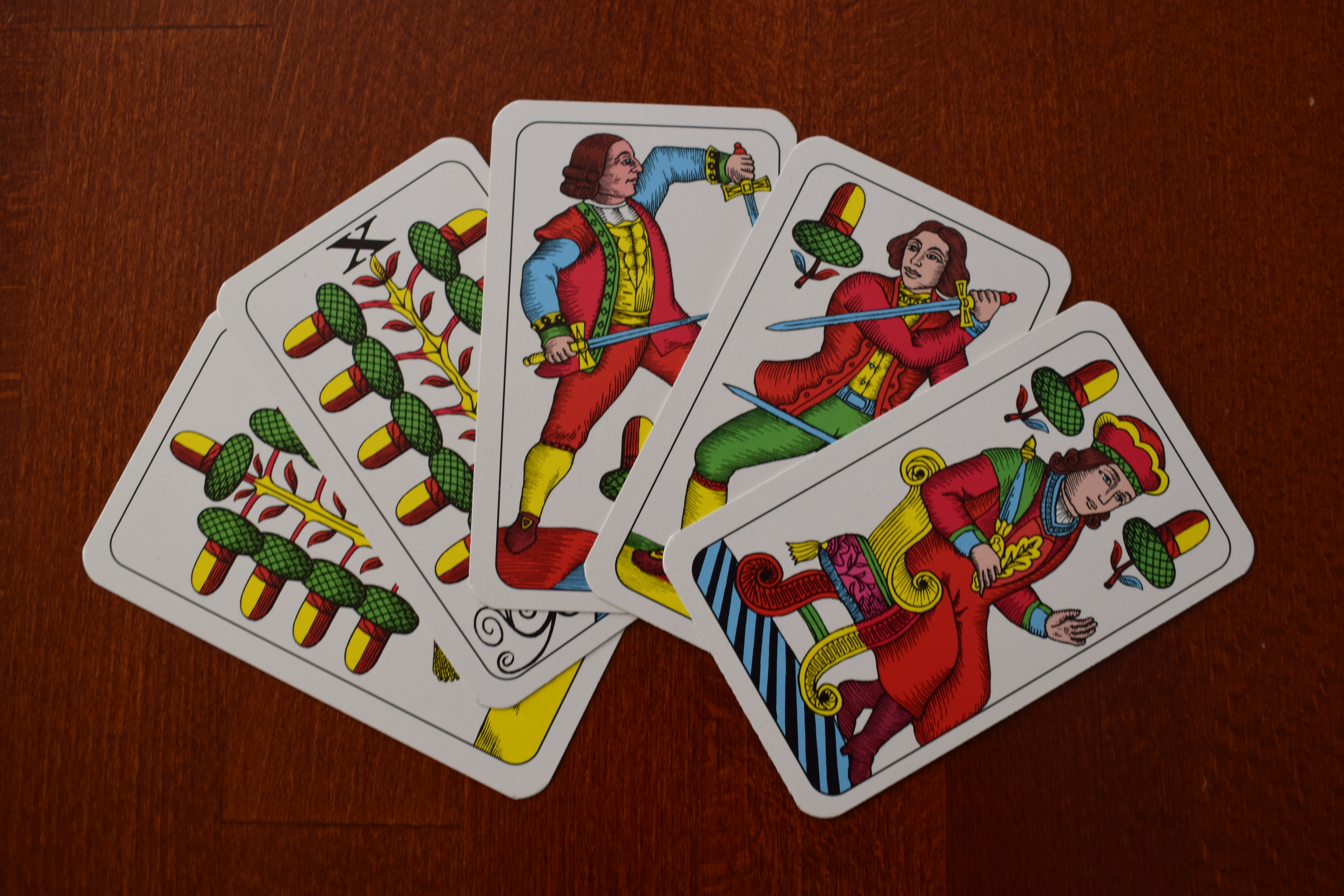
The Nine, Ten, Unter, Ober and King of Acorns from a Bohemian pack

Sedmica is played with 32 cards. If German suited cards are used the pack comprises:

- 4 x Sevens (sedmica)
- 4 x Eights (osmica)
- 4 x Nines (devetica)
- 4 x Tens (desetica)
- 4 x Unters (dolnjak)
- 4 x Obers (gornjak)
- 4 x Kings (kralj)
- 4 x Aces (as)

=== Suits ===
The cards typically have the following suits:

Acorns	Leaves	Hearts	Bells

== Rules ==
The basic motto of the game is: "A card takes a card, the Seven takes everything." The following rules are based on McLeod:

Players are dealt four cards each and the rest are placed face down as a talon. Any card may be played. To win the trick, however, a card of equal rank to the led card must be played or, alternatively, any Seven. The trick winner is the last player to play an equal-ranking card or Seven.

If the winning card is played by an opponent of the player who led, the latter may continue the trick by playing another equal-ranker or Seven. The other players must now all play a card. This may continue for further rounds of the same trick. The number of trick rounds therefore depends on the player who led.

- Example: An Eight is led to the trick. After four cards have been played, the player who played the last Eight or a Seven wins the trick unless the first player has another Eight or Seven when he may play that and the others must now all play another card.

After each trick, players replenish their cards so that they always have four. Once the talon is exhausted, the game continues until the remaining cards have been played out. Then the game is over and the players count up their points.

Partners may communicate as follows:

- Ubij ("kill") - take the trick
- Pusti ("let it go") - let our opponents take the trick
- Napuni ("fill it") - smear the trick because I will win it.

== Scoring ==
The only counters are the Aces and Tens which are worth 10 points each. The winner of the last trick also scores 10 points for a total of 90 in the deal. The object is to win more than half of them, i.e. at least 50 points. Game is 120 points.
