= Viersche =

German card game

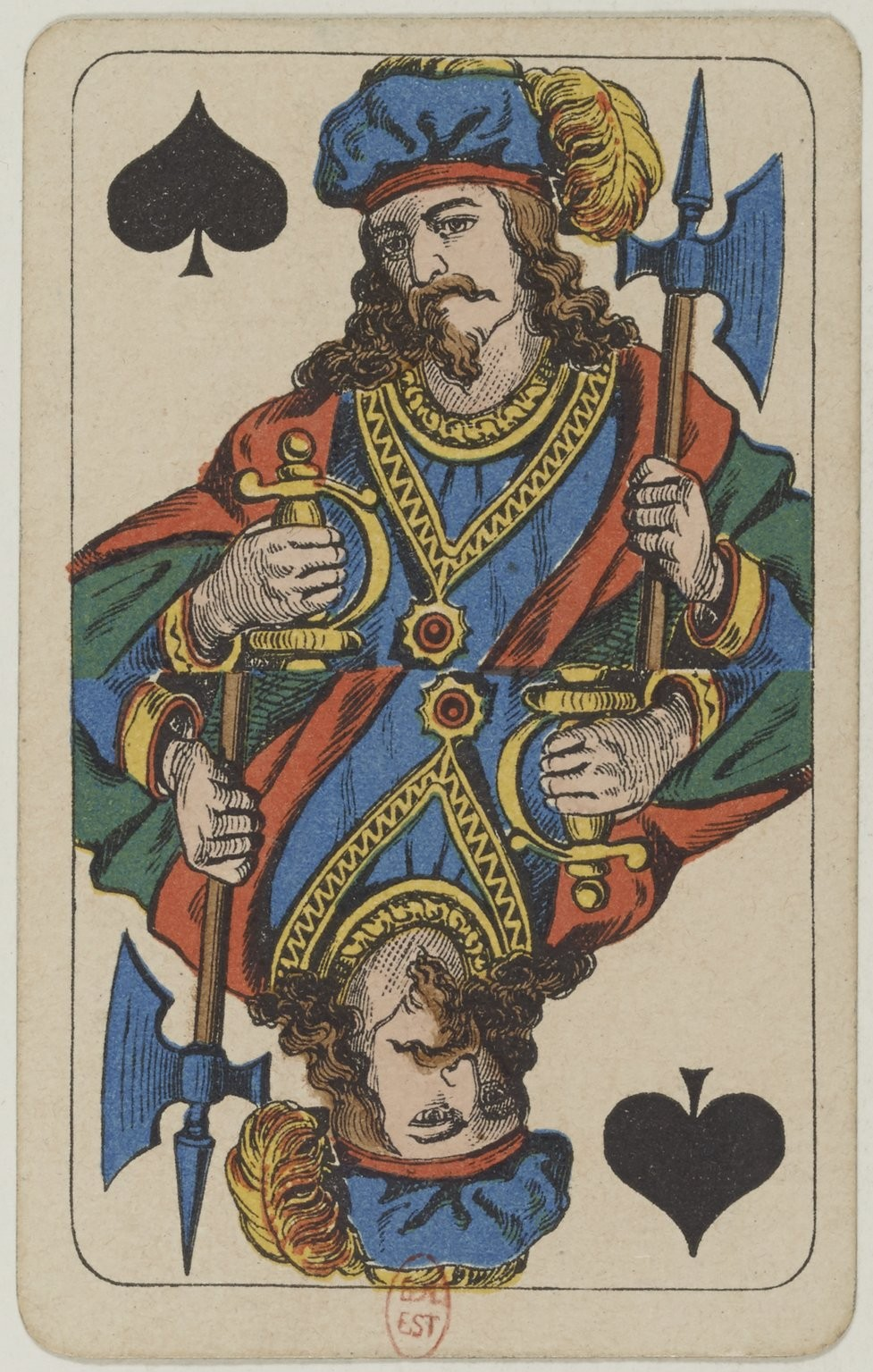
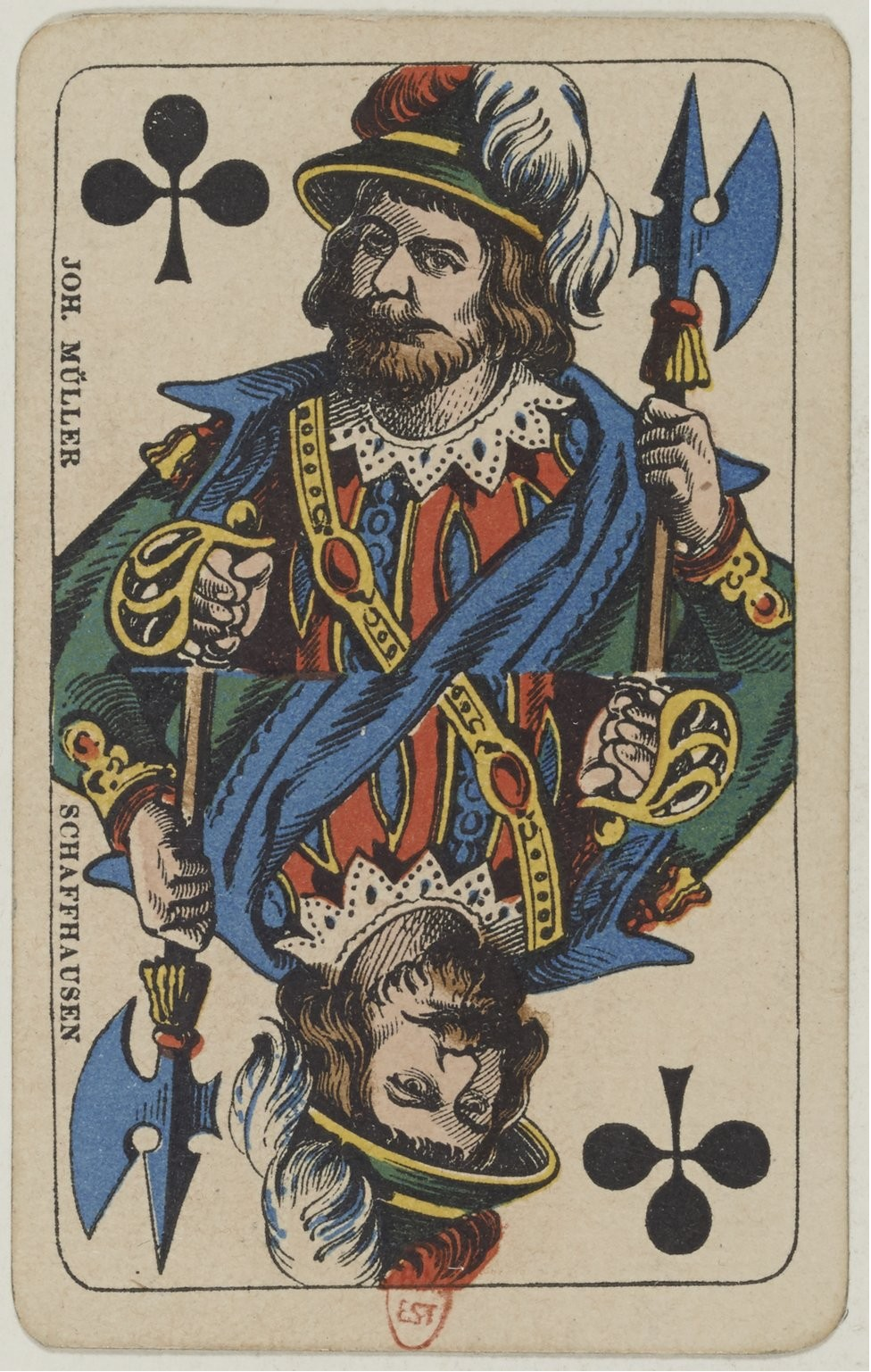
- The Old Man and Little Man if ♠ are trumps
- Origin: Black Forest, Germany
- Alternative names: Hundert
- Type: Point-trick
- Players: 4 (2 x 2)
- Cards: 36
- Deck: French pack (Tapp)
- Rank (high→low): A K Q J 10 9 8 7 6
- Play: Anticlockwise

Related games
- Hindersche

Viersche, also called Hundert or Hunderte, is a card game of the ace–ten type for four players that is played in the Wolf valley in the Black Forest region of Germany.

== History and distribution ==
Little is known of the origins of Viersche, but its mode of play – anticlockwise, number of 36 cards and ranking of the ten all suggest it is very old. (Note: In almost all ace–ten games, the ten is promoted to rank between the ace and king.) It is closely linked to Hindersche, a game that was played by foresters, farmers and day workers in the old Principality of Fürstenberg, an old Swabia state whose rulers governed the southwestern part of the Black Forest and the Baar region. However, the earliest record of Viersche is a 1932 map of where the most common card games in the state of Baden are played, which shows that Hundert was played in the area of the Wolf valley as well as in small isolated clusters to the north, south and west.

Viersche tournaments have been held, apparently annually, since at least 2003, usually around Epiphany, in Bad Rippoldsau in the central Black Forest and hosting 36 to 40 players from that village as well as Schapbach, Oberwolfach, Kniebis, Fischingen and Hausach. The winners are the team with the fewest penalty points or Bollen. The team or teams with the most Bollen are called the 'Bollen Kings' (Bollenkönige).

== Rules ==
=== Overview ===
Unlike Hindersche, which is a reverse game whose name means "backwards" in Swabian, Viersche is a normal 'forward' game, hence the name, which means "forwards" in Swabian. Its alternative name of Hundert (German: "hundred") comes from the target score needed to win. Viersche is played by four players in teams of two with the partners sitting opposite one another.

=== Equipment ===
A slate, chalk, sponge and a pack of 36 French-suited, Berlin pattern cards is used. The Jass/Tapp packs that were once common, have recently ceased production, so players now remove the low cards (2s – 5s) and jokers from a standard 52-card pack. There are the usual four suits – clubs, spades, hearts and diamonds – each of nine cards ranking A > K > Q > J > 10 > 9 > 8 > 7. An exception is that the trump jack, known as de Alt ("the old man") is promoted to be the highest card and the jack of the same colour, de kloei ("the little man") is the second-highest trump. These two jacks have a card point value of 12; the other two jacks are worth 2 points. The remaining cards are valued as follows: A 11, king 4, queen 3, ten 10, remainder 0. Thus there are 140 points in the pack.

=== Aim ===
The aim is to be the first team to score 100 card points in tricks. This earns 1 game point. Taking all 9 tricks earns 2 game points. The winners are the first to score 4 game points.

=== Deal ===
The dealer shuffles the pack and offers it to the left for cutting before dealing nine cards each, anticlockwise and in turn, in batches of 3, beginning with forehand. Thereafter the deal rotates to the right.

=== Play ===
Forehand leads any trump to the first trick. Lacking trumps, forehand plays any card, face down, as a trump. The others must then play a trump if able and the trick will be won by the highest trump.

Any card may be led to subsequent tricks. Players must either follow suit or play a trump. If unable to follow suit, players may play any card. The highest trump wins the trick or, if no trumps are played, the highest card of the led suit. The trick winner leads to the next trick.

=== Scoring ===
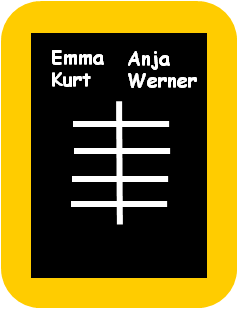
Viersche slate – starting layout

At the start of each game, a chicken ladder comprising 4 horizontal lines bisected by a vertical line is chalked on the slate; each side of the ladder represents one of the teams (see illustration). As a team scores a game point it erases a 'rung' on its side of the ladder.

At the end of a deal, teams tot up their card points in tricks, their combined total should always come to 140. The team scoring 100 or more wins. If neither side makes 100, the team with the higher score records this on their side of the slate below the ladder and a second deal is played. As soon as either team reaches 100, the second deal ends. The first team to 100 is the winner and erases one rung. If a team wins all 9 tricks it erases two rungs.

The game ends once either team has erased 4 rungs; the losers chalk a mark in the form of a line or a ball on their side of the slate. If a team loses without erasing a single mark, it chalks two marks on the slate frame. Once a team has accumulated 4 marks on the frame, the session ends.

== Literature ==
- Eaton, Paul (2023). "Playing the Game Forwards: Viersche – another Black Forest gem" in The Playing-Card, Vol. 51, No. 4. ISSN 1752-671X pp. 148–151.
- Schlager, Friedrich (1951). "Das badische Nationalspiel 'Zego' und die andern in Baden und an Badens Grenzen volksüblichen Kartenspiele," in Karl Friedrich Müller, ed., Beiträge zur Sprachwissenschaft und Volkskunde: Festschrift für Ernst Ochs. Lahr: Moritz Schauenburg, pp. 293–307.
