= Fingerkloppe =

Card Game

Fingerkloppe, also just Kloppe, sometimes also called Rot Händle ("Little Red Hand") Metzger ("Butcher"), Bratzln ‚ Pfötchen ("Little Paw"), Knipper, Fleischer ("Butcher"), Feuer ("Fire") or Folter Mau Mau ("Torture Mau-Mau") ("Torture Mau Mau") is a card game, which is normally played with a Skat pack of 32 cards. Depending on the number of players, the number of cards may, however, be greater. The game is common in the German-speaking region among children and young people.

== Playing ==
=== Card game ===
Each player is dealt four cards, except the player to the right of the dealer who is dealt five and starts the game. The aim is to collect four cards of the same value (a so-called quartet) in one's hand (e. g. four Unters or Bauern). This is achieved by passing the "fifth" card each time to the player on the right. The latter takes the card and gives another card, or the passed card, to the right in turn. If a card does the complete circuit it is out of the game and a new card is drawn from the top of the talon. A player who achieves the aim of having four cards of equal rank in hand, places them face up and calls "Fingerkloppe!". The other players must immediately place their cards down likewise. Whoever is the last to do this has lost. In a two-hand game, the loser is the one who has not managed to collect four cards of a kind.

=== Penalties ===
After the card game follows the award of penalties to the loser. Two different penalty systems have established themselves:

In the original case the loser names a card (e. g. Ace of Hearts or Ober of Leaves) and the winner searches through the shuffled talon from the top until the chosen card appears and picks up the entire stack down to that card. The loser is then rapped on the fingertips with that stack of cards.

In the second case, the loser also names a desired card and also whether the talon is to be counted down from the top or up from the bottom. The loser then places one hand, palm downwards under the table. The winner now picks the top or bottom card at will. The suit of that card indicates what penalty the loser receives:

- Hearts = winner strokes back of loser's hand
- Diamonds/Bells = winner runs knuckles firmly over back of loser's hand
- Spades/Leaves = winner punches back of loser's hand with fist
- Clubs/Acorns = winner pinches back of loser's hand

This continues until the named card appears. Then a new game starts.

== Variations ==
- Each player, not just the winner, penalises the loser
- Quartets of cards are removed from a pack corresponding to the number of players (for four players i.e. 16 cards). These cards are shuffled and dealt, the same number to each player. The game is then played as before, until someone has a set of four cards.
- If the loser withdraws his or her hand when being punished, the entire stack is used as a penalty.
