= Kachufool =

Indian card game

Kachufol or kachuful, is a trick-taking card game that originated in India. It is a variation of oh hell and is also known as "judgment" and "forecasting" in English-speaking countries. There are several variations of the game.

== Play ==
The game is played in rounds, with each round having a different number of cards per hand and a different trump suit, progressing through spades, diamonds, clubs and hearts. The game's name, which means "raw flower" serves a mnemonic for the sequence in Gujarati (kari, chukat, falli, lal).

The game continues for as many rounds as possible according to the number of players, i.e. for 6 players 8 rounds can be played before running out of cards.

Each player is dealt the designated number of cards for the round. For bidding two conventions can be used:

1. Players simultaneously declare the number of tricks they will take by the number of fingers held out.
2. The player left of the dealer states how many tricks he will do, then the person clockwise declares and so on. The final person cannot declare the number of tricks that would complete the round, e.g. for round 5, if 4 tricks have been declared, the final person cannot declare 1 trick.

If more than 5 players are playing, no player can bid zero more than 5 times in a row. If a player bids zero five times in a row, the 6th time has to be a non-zero bid.

The game is played like any other trick taking game starting with the player left of the dealer. The tricks for each player are counted at the end and each player that successfully takes the exact number of tricks that he declared receives ten plus the number of tricks declared/taken. Each player that does not take the exact number of tricks gets 0 points for the round. If any player counted more than 10 hands then player will have moth 100 points.

If the player bets 1 hand and gets 1 hand in the play, he will get 10 points, and if he bets zero he will still get 10 points and if he bets 2 hands he will get 20 points and so on, but if he loses to make his own bet hands he gets zero.
