= Trekort =

Danish card game

- Origin: Denmark
- Alternative names: Tre-kort, trikort
- Type: Plain-trick game
- Family: Rams group
- Players: 4-5
- Cards: 36
- Deck: French-suited pack
- Rank (high→low): Natural (Ace high)
- Play: Clockwise
- Chance: high

Related games
- Knack • Köpknack • Rams • Svängknack • Norseman's knock

Trekort, tre-kort or, in Swedish, also trikort, is an old card game of Danish origin for four or five players that was usually played for money. It was also known in Sweden, where it developed into the variant of knack. The name trekort is also loosely used to describe related three-card games such as Swedish köpknack. The name means "three cards" and may therefore be related to German Dreiblatt.

== History ==
The rules of trekort are first recorded in a short Danish games compendium in 1774. They were reprinted with minor changes by Jørgensen in the early decades of the 19th century and followed by other accounts of the same basic rules during the mid-19th century. The game appears to have been popular with farmers and was described as "infamous" as well as rowdy and the reason why card playing was condemned by many as "anything but an innocent pleasure." Sometimes significant amounts of money were wagered and cheating and brawling were not unknown. Christensen (1908) records that "they cursed and banged the table so hard that the shot-glasses and everything on the table danced and rattled."

The game had reached Sweden by 1839 when an identical set of rules to those of Jørgensen (1829) was published that same year in Swedish. It was still current around 1870 as 'trikort' and appears to have developed since then into the more elaborate variants of knack, köpknack and svängknack. In Germany, the game went under the name of Dreiblatt or Dreekart, although those names were also given to various other, unrelated, games.

== Rules ==
The following description is based on Kebslein (1774), who is closely followed by Jørgensen (1829):

=== Preliminaries ===
The game is best played by five players. A pack of 36 French-suited cards is used, presumably ranking in their natural order, aces high. After shuffling well, the dealer offers the cards to the right for cutting and then deals to the left, first two cards apiece, and then a third card each, before turning the next for trumps.

Players then examine their cards and, beginning with forehand, announce whether they will play or pass. Players that pass return their cards to the stock which is not used.

=== Play ===
Although not explicit, it is assumed that players have to follow suit if able; otherwise may trump or discard as they choose. The rules state that, if there are three or more active players, a trump must be led to the first trick, if the player on lead has one. Likewise a trump must be led to the second, but if the player leading to the trick has no trumps, he may play any card face down and subsequent players must now play a trump to beat it. Any card may be led to the third and final trick. The highest trump wins; if none are played, the highest card of the led suit takes the trick.

If there are only two active players, the rules are relaxed, the only stipulation being that, once the first trick has been played, a trump ranking from jack to ace must be led to the second. If the player on lead has the trump ace, he must play it; failing that, the trump king.

=== Settling the score ===
The dealer pays each trick winner, the amount agreed per trick. The first time an active player fails to take a trick, he must pay a bête equivalent to the stake i.e. value of three tricks. The rules are unclear as to how this works. It is likely that the bête was recorded e.g. on a slate or the table and played for in the next deal. Each subsequent bête is worth the basic stake paid by the dealer plus the amount of the smallest existing bête on the table. The smallest bête is played for first, followed by the others in increasing order.

== Variations ==
Later rules describe the following variations:

- A piquet pack of 32 cards was used, but sixes could also be added.
- More than five players could participate.
- The trump ace must be played to the first trick.
- Bêtes were chalked on the table as crossbars on lines radiating towards the player from a circle.
- Bêtes increased by the basic stake each time, but were not played for immediately. At an agreed point in the game, the players then played for them in ascending order.

== Literature ==
- _ (1847). Ny och fullständig svensk spelbok. Gothenburg: Bonniers.
- Kebslein (1774). Politiske Spille Regler for de tilladelige og meest brugelige Spii i Vertshusene. Copenhagen, 28 pp.
- Jørgensen, S. A. (1829). Nyeste Dansk Spillebog. Copenhagen.
- Schwartz, Martin (1847). Nye og fuldstoendig Dansk Spillebog. Copenhagen.
- Christensen, Anders (1908). Fynske Bønders Liv I Forrige Aarhundredes Midte [The Life of Funen Farmers in the Middle of the Last Century]. Odense: Milo’ske Boghandels.
