= Bauernfangen =

Austrian card game

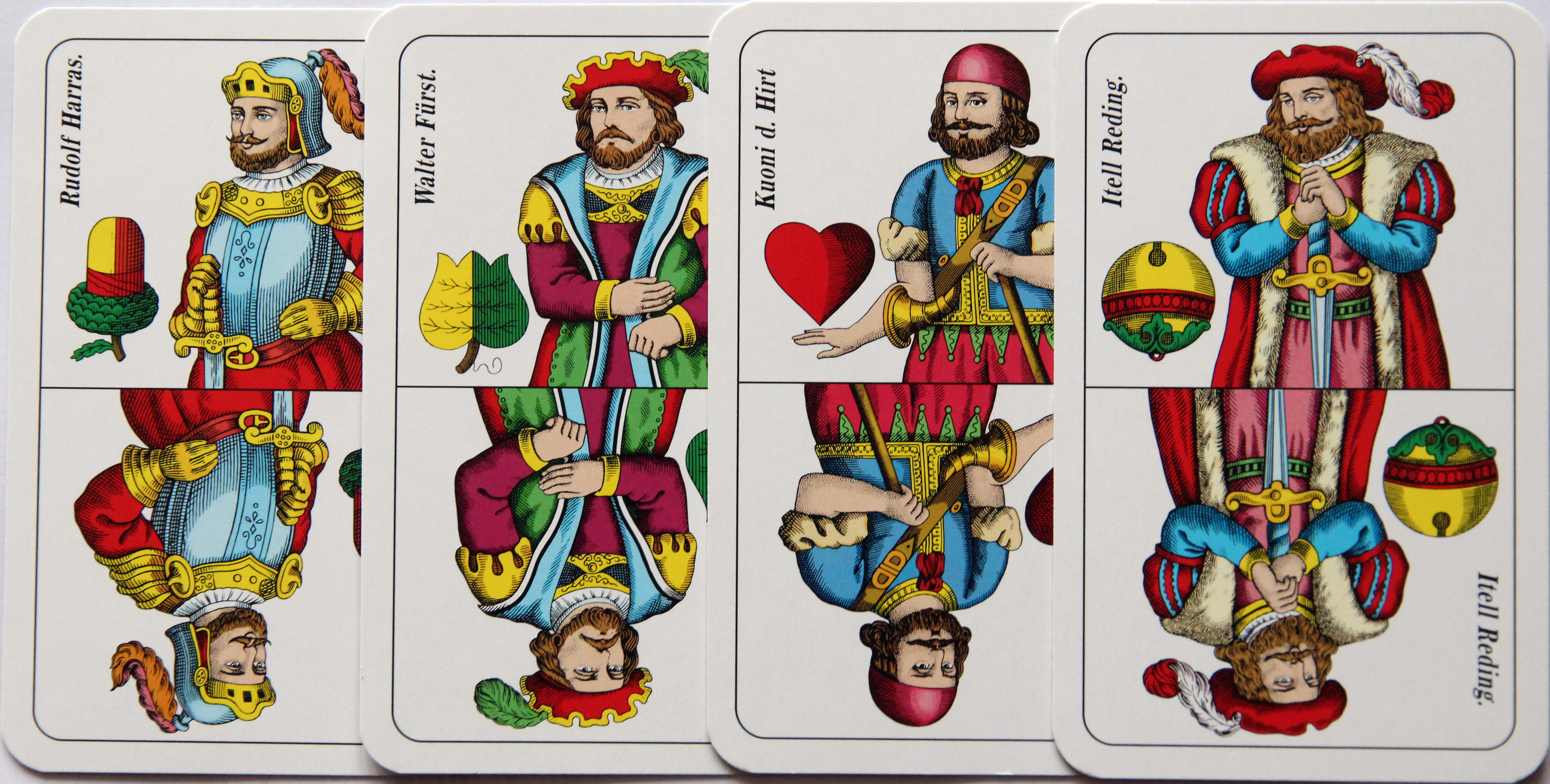
- The four 'farmers' (Unters) in a Tell pack
- Origin: Austria
- Type: Point-trick
- Players: 4 (5)
- Cards: 20
- Deck: William Tell or French pack
- Rank (high→low): A K O U 10
- Play: Clockwise

Bauernfangen ("catching farmers") is an old, trick-taking card game for 4 – 5 players, that used to be very popular especially in the Upper Austrian Hausruckviertel, and in the German-speaking region of South Bohemia where it was called Bauanfonga. Today it is also played in Lower Austria. It should not be confused with a game of the same name played in Bavaria which resembles Grasoberln except that the Green Unter replaces the Green Ober.

== Cards ==
Bauernfangen is played with a French or double German pack with the suits of Hearts, Diamonds/Bells, Spades/Leaves and Clubs/Acorns. There are five playing cards which rank as follows in descending order: Ace, King, Ober, Unter or Bower (Bauer = "farmer", plural: Bauern), Ten. There is no trump suit.

== Rules ==
There are 4 deals in the first leg and 4 in the return leg. In the first leg, the aim is not to take any Bowers in the tricks; in the return leg, players must aim to capture as many 'farmers' as possible.

At the start of the game, lots are drawn to decide the dealer. He then deals the cards clockwise so that every player has the same number of hand cards. The player to the left of the dealer leads to the first trick. As far as possible, players must follow suit. But they do not have to win the trick. If a player is void in the led suit, she may discard any card. The player with the highest card of the led suit wins the trick and leads to the next one. The deal ends when all four farmers have been captured.

== Scoring ==
Only the farmers captured in the individual games are counted.

In the first leg the stakes are paid into a common pot in the middle of the table; in the return leg the relevant sum is paid out from the pot. The farmers have different values as follows:

- Unter of Hearts (Jack of Hearts): 0.40 euros
- Unter of Bells (Jack of Diamonds): 0.30 euros
- Unter of Leaves (Jack of Spades): 0.20 euros
- Unter of Acorns (Jack of Clubs): 0.10 euros

== Game end ==
The winner is the player who has won the most money after 8 hands. The game may be repeated as many times as desired.
