= Turkish king =

Game

Turkish king (also called Rıfkı) is a Turkish compendium game for four players comprising 20 rounds. It is a variety of the game king, which is popular in France, Belgium, Italy, Portugal, Russia, Colombia, and Brazil.

== Rules ==
Turkish king is played with a Turkish 52-card pack, with cards ranking in their natural order, aces high.

Deal and play are anti-clockwise. The dealer shuffles and the player facing him cuts. All cards are then dealt.

Turkish king is made up of six negative contracts and one positive:

- Rıfkı: K♥ is the only penalty card, scoring −320
- Kız (girls): Each queen scores −100
- Erkek (boys): Each jack or king scores −60
- Kupa (hearts): Each heart scores −30
- Son İki (last two): Each of last two tricks scores −180
- El Almaz (no tricks): Each trick scores −50
- Trump: Each trick scores +50

Players must follow suit whenever possible, and if unable, must play a trump in a trump contract, a penalty card in negative contracts, and hearts in Rıfkı. No hearts may be lead to start a trick in Hearts and Rıfkı. If a player does not have a card greater than 10 in a Trump contract, they can declare a misdeal. Similarly, if a player only has the K♥ or the A♥ in the hearts suit in Rıfkı, they may declare a misdeal. Finally, the Girls contract is considered a misdeal if all players take one queen each.

The player who is dealt the 2♦ becomes the declarer first round, and the position rotates conuterclockwise afterwards. Each negative contract is played only twice (as opposed to the four times as in regular barbu) during the game, and the trump contract is played a total of eight times. Deal passes between each hand (as in quick rotation barbu) and each player chooses just three negative and two trump contracts during the course of the game. In the end, scores add up to zero. All the players with positive score declared as winners and others as losers.
