= Köpknack =

Swedish card game

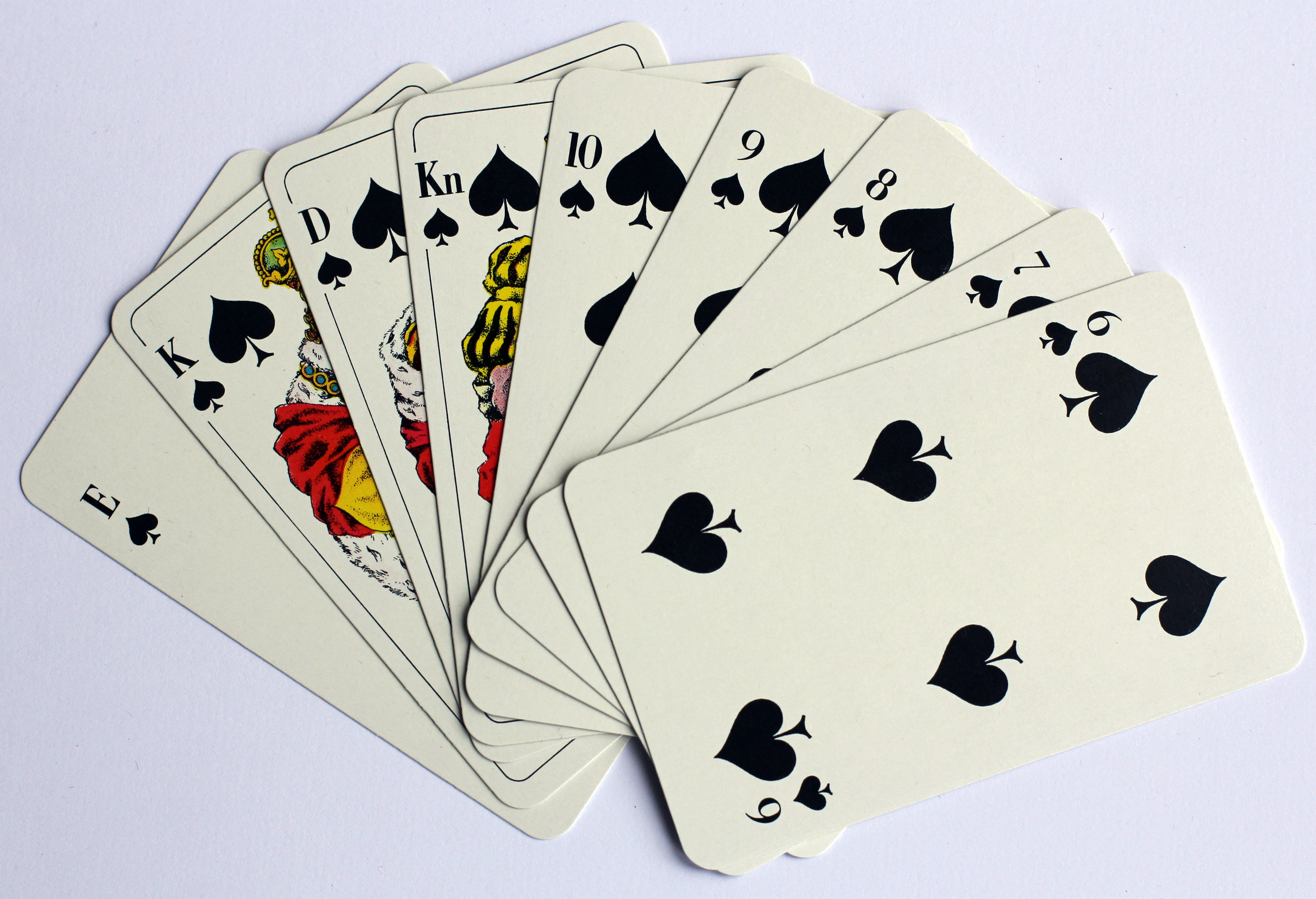
- The spades in a modern Swedish pattern pack
- Origin: Sweden
- Type: Plain-trick game
- Family: Rams group
- Players: 6-8
- Cards: 52
- Deck: Modern Swedish pattern, French-suited pack
- Rank (high→low): Natural (Ace high)
- Play: Clockwise

Related games
- Rams • Knack • Svängknack • Norseman's knock • Trekort

Köpknack (lit. 'draw knock') is an old Swedish card game which is a development of knack and, like the latter, is mainly played for stakes. The game is also known as trekort which, however, usually refers to a simpler version of Danish origin that may have been its progenitor.

== Cards ==
A normal French-suited pack with 52 cards is used, normally of the modern Swedish pattern.

== Deal ==
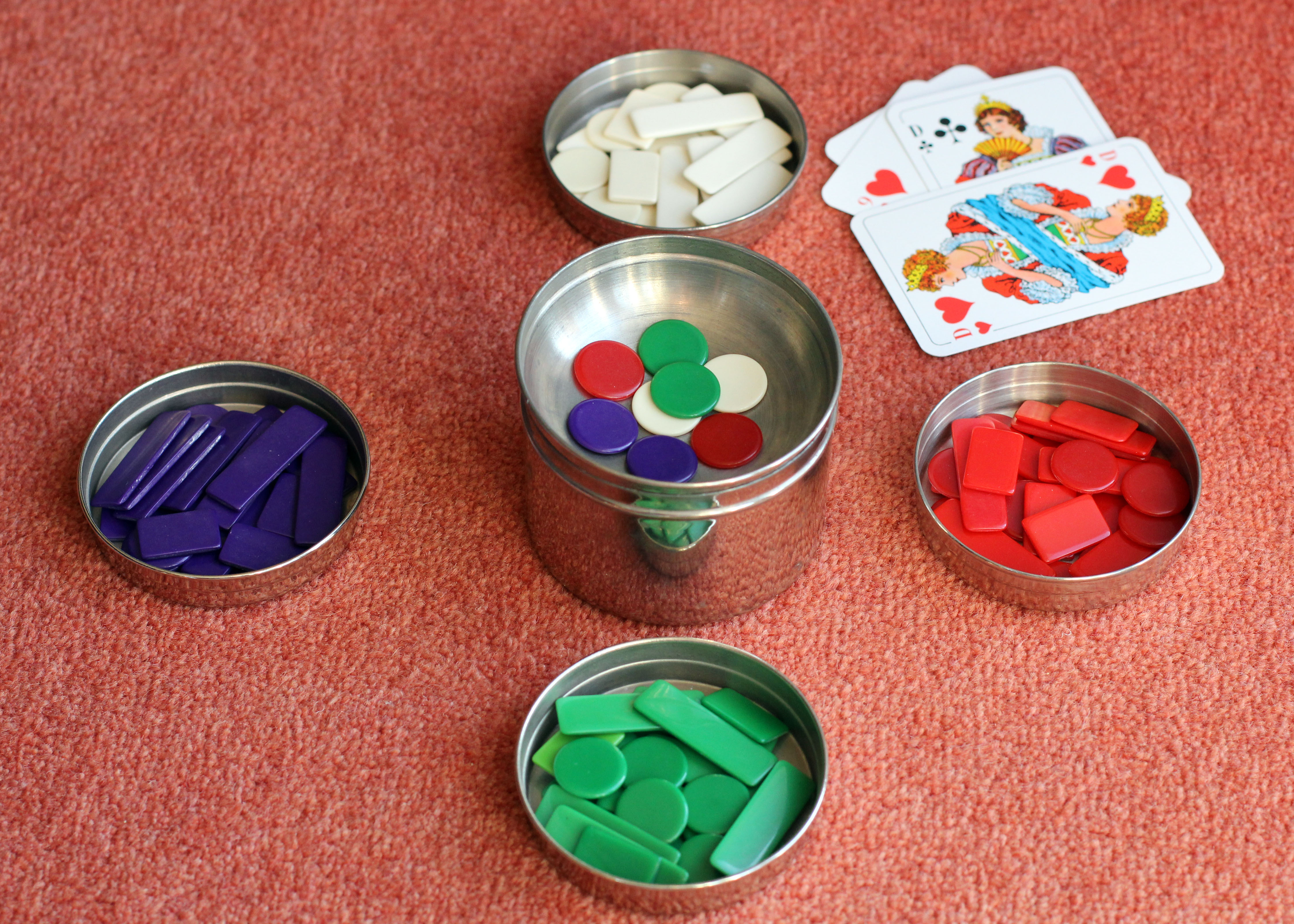
A virapulla - traditional Swedish tin for holding gaming counters

Players draw lots for seating and first dealer. Deal and play are clockwise. The dealer antes the agreed stake—which must be divisible by three—to the pot, shuffles the cards and offers them to his right for cutting. Three cards are dealt to each player in packets of 2 and 1; then the next card is turned to determine trumps, and the remaining cards stacked face down form the talon.

== Bidding ==
Players now bid in clockwise order beginning with forehand and may either 'knock' (by tapping the table) to indicate they will play, or throw their hand face down to the dealer to indicate they will fold. If all bar the dealer fold, the dealer sweeps the pot and the deal passes to the left. Likewise if one knocks and the rest fold, the knocker sweeps the pot.

The players now have the opportunity, in turn beginning with forehand, to exchange cards with the talon. Players may stick with the hand they were dealt or exchange one, two or three cards. A player who wants to exchange gives his discards to the dealer who replaces them from the stock. There are two rounds of exchanges, so players may exchange a second time. Once the talon is exhausted, no more cards may be exchanged.

== Play ==
The active players (those who did not fold) now play out the deal. Forehand leads to the first trick with any card. Suit must always be followed. In addition:

- First trick: Subject to the requirement to follow suit, a player who can head the trick with a trump must do so.
- Second trick: The winner of the first trick must lead a trump if possible, otherwise may play any card. A player unable to follow suit, must trump if possible. Subject to the requirement to follow suit, a player who can head the trick with a trump must do so.

The trick is won by the highest trump or the highest card of the led suit if no trumps are played.

Any active player who fails to take a trick must pay a double stake to the pot. Each trick taken earns a third of the pot's contents.

== See also ==
- Loo
- Svängknack

== Literature ==
- _ (2006). PDF-kompendium över kortspel.
- Ericsson, Gustaf (1990). Folklivet i Åkers och Rekarne Härader. Part 2 (PDF). Uppsala: dialect and ancient memory archive. pp. 168–169. ISBN 91-85540-51-X. Archived from the original (PDF) on 2020-07-04.
- Kortspelsregler till tidsfördriv och nöje (2nd ed.). Stockholm: Wahlström & Widstrand. 1941. pp. 40–41.
- Schenkmanis, Ulf (1988). Kortspel & Patienser. Västerås: ICA. pp. 258–259. ISBN 91-534-1178-1.
- Schenkmanis, Ingalill; Schenkmanis, Ulf (1982). 64 Kortspel. Västerås: ICA. pp. 154–155. ISBN 91-534-0660-5.
