= Pok Deng =

Thai gambling card game

- ป๊อกเด้ง
- Origin: Thailand
- Alternative names: Pok Kao (ป๊อกเก้า) or Pok Paet Pok Kao (ป๊อกแปดป๊อกเก้า)
- Type: Comparing-type
- Players: 2-17
- Cards: 52
- Deck: French
- Play: Clockwise or Counter-clockwise
- Playing time: 5 minutes
- Chance: High

Related games
- Baccarat

Pok Deng (Thai: ป๊อกเด้ง) is a Thai gambling card game in which players aim for a hand whose ones digit beats the dealer's, while taking into account pairs, three of a kinds, and flushes. The game is also known as Pok Kao (Thai: ป๊อกเก้า, kao means "nine") or Pok Baet Pok Kao (Thai: ป๊อกแปดป๊อกเก้า, baet means "eight") due to eights and nines being high, desirable values.

== Basic steps of play ==
1. The players place their bets.
2. The dealer shuffles and deals two cards to each player, ending with the dealer.
3. Each player may stay or draw one card.
4. The dealer may compare their hand against select players.
5. The dealer may draw a card.
6. The dealer compares their hand against the rest of the players.

== Setup ==
Pok Deng supports two to seventeen players, including the dealer, but is recommended for three to nine players. To begin, players designate a dealer. One person may remain the dealer for several rounds or players can agree to switch off being dealer.

Each game is fairly short, lasting several seconds to a couple of minutes. Each player, except the dealer, places a bet using cash, chips, or small objects like wrapped candy and places that bet on the table in front of themself. Each player plays versus the dealer only and is not competing with fellow players. The dealer shuffles a standard 52-card deck of playing cards; determines whether to go clockwise or counterclockwise; and deals two cards face down, one at a time, to each player, ending on themself. The remaining cards become the draw pile.

== Playing ==
Play goes in the same order that the cards were dealt. During a player's turn, that person has the option of drawing a card (hitting) or not (staying). A player may only draw one card from the top of the draw pile, meaning each player ends up with only two or three cards per game. (Because each player can have up to three cards, seventeen is the maximum number of players before cards would run out.)

If the player's starting hand of two cards has a taem (described below) of eight or nine, that person has pok (Thai: ป๊อก) announces it, and immediately shows those cards face-up. This is a good hand, and the player may not draw a card.

The dealer takes their turn last. If the dealer has pok, those cards are turned face-up and all players' hands are compared to the dealer's. If the dealer does not have pok, before deciding to draw a card, the dealer may reveal select players' hands and compare them to their own and make the payouts. Then the dealer may draw a card and then compare the rest of the players' hands to their own.

== Card values ==
Three aspects of a player's hand determine the scoring: (1) the hand type, (2) taem, which is the numerical value, and (3) deng, which is a special aspect that may multiply the bet.

The hand's numerical score, taem (Thai: แต้ม), is determined by the numerical values of the cards in hand. In terms of each card's numerical values, each ace has a value of one. 2 through 9 have corresponding values of two through nine. 10, jack, queen, and king each have a value of zero or ten. Taem, the numerical value of the overall hand, is simply the ones digit of the sum of the cards, which is why it does not matter whether the 10, jack, queen, and king count as zero or ten. For example, a hand consisting of a 3 and a 2 has a value of five taem. Likewise, a hand consisting of a 7 and an 8 has a value of five taem because the sum, fifteen, has a one's digit of five. A hand with a jack and a 5 also has a value of five taem because the sum, either five or fifteen, has a one's digit of five.

The bet multiplier, deng (Thai: เด้ง), is determined by the relationship among the cards in hand:

- Song deng: If a player has only two cards in hand, and both those cards share the same suit (flush), number or letter (pair), they have song deng (Thai: สองเด้ง, song means "two"). A player with both pok and deng has pok deng (Thai: ป๊อกเด้ง). The payout of a winning song deng hand may be up to two times the original betting amount.
- Sam deng: If a player has three cards, and all three cards share the same suit (flush), they have sam deng (Thai: สามเด้ง, sam means "three"). The payout of a winning sam deng hand may be up to three times the original betting amount. A variation of the game also allows three cards that are a straight to be considered sam deng.
- Others: By default, a hand that doesn't exhibit any special properties has one deng. The hand types sam lueang and tong have three and five deng, respectively, as described below. Pok may have one or two deng. A normal hand may have one to three deng.

The hand type may be one of four types, in order of decreasing rank:

- Pok: If a player's starting hand of two cards has a numerical value of eight or nine, that person has pok, announces it, and immediately shows those cards face-up. This is a better hand than any other non-pok.
- Tong: If a player has three cards in hand and they are all the same number or letter (three of a kind), that person has a three of a kind, called tong (Thai: ตอง). This hand beats sam lueang and has a deng of five.
- Sam lueang or sam krabeung: If a player has three cards in hand and they are all face cards — jacks, queens, or kings — not necessarily matching, then the player has sam lueang (Thai: สามเหลือง, lueang means "yellow") or sam krabeung (Thai: สามกระเบื้อง, krabeung means "tile", referring to the rectangles on the cards). This hand beats a normal hand and has a deng of three.
- Normal: Any other type of hand is a normal hand.

== Scoring ==
When comparing, or scoring, versus the dealer, the following rules apply. A player's hand may win against, tie with, or lose against the dealer's hand. Players compete against the dealer only and do not compare against other players. The hands are compared in terms of hand type, taem, and deng, in that order. Generally, hand type then the taem determine who wins. The deng is a tie-breaker and also determines how much is won.

First compare the hand types. If one hand has a better hand type than the other, that hand wins. The amount won is the winning hand's deng times the original bet. If both the dealer's hand and the player's hand have the same hand type, the numerical value taem is compared. If one hand has a greater taem than the other, that hand wins. The amount won is the winning hand's deng. If both hands have the same hand type and taem, the deng is compared. If one hand has a greater deng than the other, that hand wins the payout of the difference of the hands' deng. If both hands have the same hand type, taem, and deng, they tie and the original bet is returned to the player.

1. Compare hand types. The winning hand wins the bet times its deng.
2. If tied, compare taem. The winning hand wins the bet times its deng.
3. If tied, compare deng. The winning hand wins the bet times the difference in deng.
4. If tied, neither hand wins.

One exception is if one hand has a tong and the other has sam lueang. The hand with tong wins two times the bet. (This comes from five deng minus three deng.)

For example, a pok deng of 9♠ 9♦, which has eight taem two deng, beats a normal hand of A♣ 4♣ 4♦, which has nine taem one deng, because the pok hand type beats the normal hand type. The payout is twice the original bet because the winning hand has two deng. However, a pok of 5♠ 4♣, which has nine taem one deng, beats the pok deng of 9♠ 9♦. They are both pok, so the nine taem beats the eight taem, and the payout, one deng from the winning hand, is equal to the amount of the original bet.

As another example, a normal hand of 6♣ 4♣ 5♣, with five taem three deng, beats a normal hand of K♥ 2♠ A♣, with three taem one deng, and wins three times the original bet due to the three deng of the winning hand. The same normal hand of 6♣ 4♣ 5♣ beats a normal hand of K♥ 2♠ 3♣, with five taem one deng, but only wins two times the original bet because the taem are tied and the payout is the difference in deng. Likewise, the same normal hand of 6♣ 4♣ 5♣ beats a normal hand of 2♠ 3♠, with five taem two deng, but only wins one times the original bet.

== Additional rules ==
There are some additional options:

- Each player may play multiple hands if they desire, as long as the total number of hands in play does not exceed seventeen. While multiple hands can be played, cards cannot be shared between hands. Players may also bet on each other as long as the owners of each bet remember their respective bets.
- A single shared hand (Thai: ขาบ๊วย kha buai or Thai: มือบ๊วย muea buai) may be played in the center. Any number of players may place their bet in the shared hand. That shared hand is dealt either immediately before or after the dealer according to house rules. It is played by one or more of the players who placed bets there.
- When dealing, the dealer may deal one or more face up hands wherever they choose to disrupt people's sense of luck. Those junk hands must be dealt two cards as normal. During normal play, when it comes to a junk hand's turn, the dealer decides whether that hand stays or draws a card face up. House rules may determine whether the junk hand draws or not: A junk hand may be forced to draw on a non-deng four or lower but stay on a five or higher. Drawing on a deng four is questionable, which may cause quarrels among the players and dealers, so a junk hand is not recommended.
- After all the players have taken their turns, the dealer may check players as they choose. For example, if the dealer has an okay hand, such as a value of four or five, that person may choose to check certain players, such as those who have three cards, meaning their starting hands may not have been good. The dealer may then decide to draw a card and then check the rest of the hands.
- Straights are considered a special hand. Three cards that are a straight (consecutive numbers) are called riang (Thai: เรียง) and count as 3 deng. Three cards that are a straight flush (consecutive numbers and same suit) are called riang plus (Thai: เรียงฟลัช) and count as 5 deng. House rules determine whether A is low or high with regards to a straight (A-2-3-4-5-6-7-8-9-10-J-Q-K vs 2-3-4-5-6-7-8-9-10-J-Q-K-A). The straight does not wrap around (K-A-2 not allowed).

== Examples ==
The following table starts with the best hand type, pok, and goes in descending order. Examples are shown.

Hand Rankings
Hand Type	Number of Cards	Numerical Score Taem	Bet Multiplier Deng	Example 1			Example 2		
Hand Type	Number of Cards	Numerical Score Taem	Bet Multiplier Deng	Hand	Taem	Deng	Hand	Taem	Deng
Pok	2	8-9	1-2	J♦ 9♥	9	1	9♠ 9♦	8	2
Tong	3	variable	5	7♠ 7♥ 7♣	1	5	K♣ K♦ K♥	0	5
Straight Flush	3	variable	5	5♦ 6♦ 7♦	8	5	2♥ 3♥ 4♥	9	5
Straight	3	variable	3	2♠ 3♦ 4♣	9	3	7♣ 8♣ 9♥	4	3
Sam lueang	3	0	3	Q♣ J♣ J♦	0	3	J♣ Q♠ K♠	0	3
Normal	2-3	0-9	1-3	A♣ 4♣	5	2	5♥ 7♥ 7♠	9	1
