= Sedma =

Austro-Hungarian card game

- A point-trick game in which tricks are won by matching cards
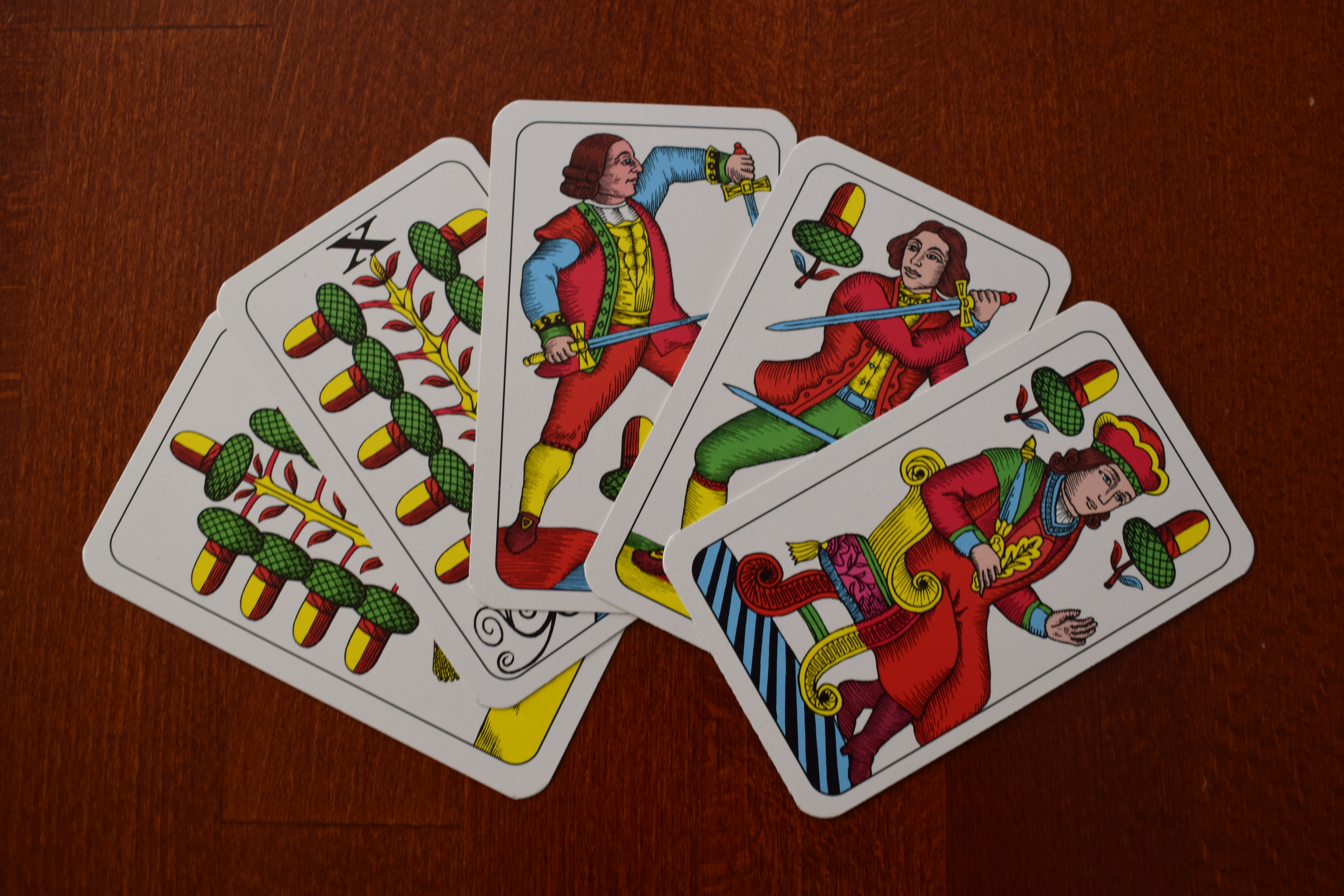
- 9, 10, Unter, Ober & King of Acorns from a Bohemian pack
- Origin: Bohemia
- Type: Point-trick
- Players: 2 or 2×2
- Skills: Strategy
- Cards: 32
- Deck: German-suited, Bohemian-pattern cards
- Playing time: 25 min.
- Chance: Medium

Related games
- Ristikontra • Hola • Lusti-Kartl'n • Sedmice • Șeptică • Zsíros

Sedma is a Czech 4-card trick-and-draw game played by four players in fixed partnerships with a 32-card Bohemian-pattern pack. Card suits do not play a role in this game, and there is no ranking order. A trick is won by the last player to play a card of the same rank as the card led.

The card game gives its name to the 'Sedma group' which includes closely related games such as the Finnish Ristikontra, the Yugoslavian Sedmice, the Romanian Șeptică, the Hungarian Zsírozás (also Zsíros or Zsír), the Bavarian Lusti-Kartl'n, the German Schmierer and the possibly Polish Hola. These games have been described as highly unusual members of the ace–ten family, found only in Central and Eastern Europe.

== Cards ==
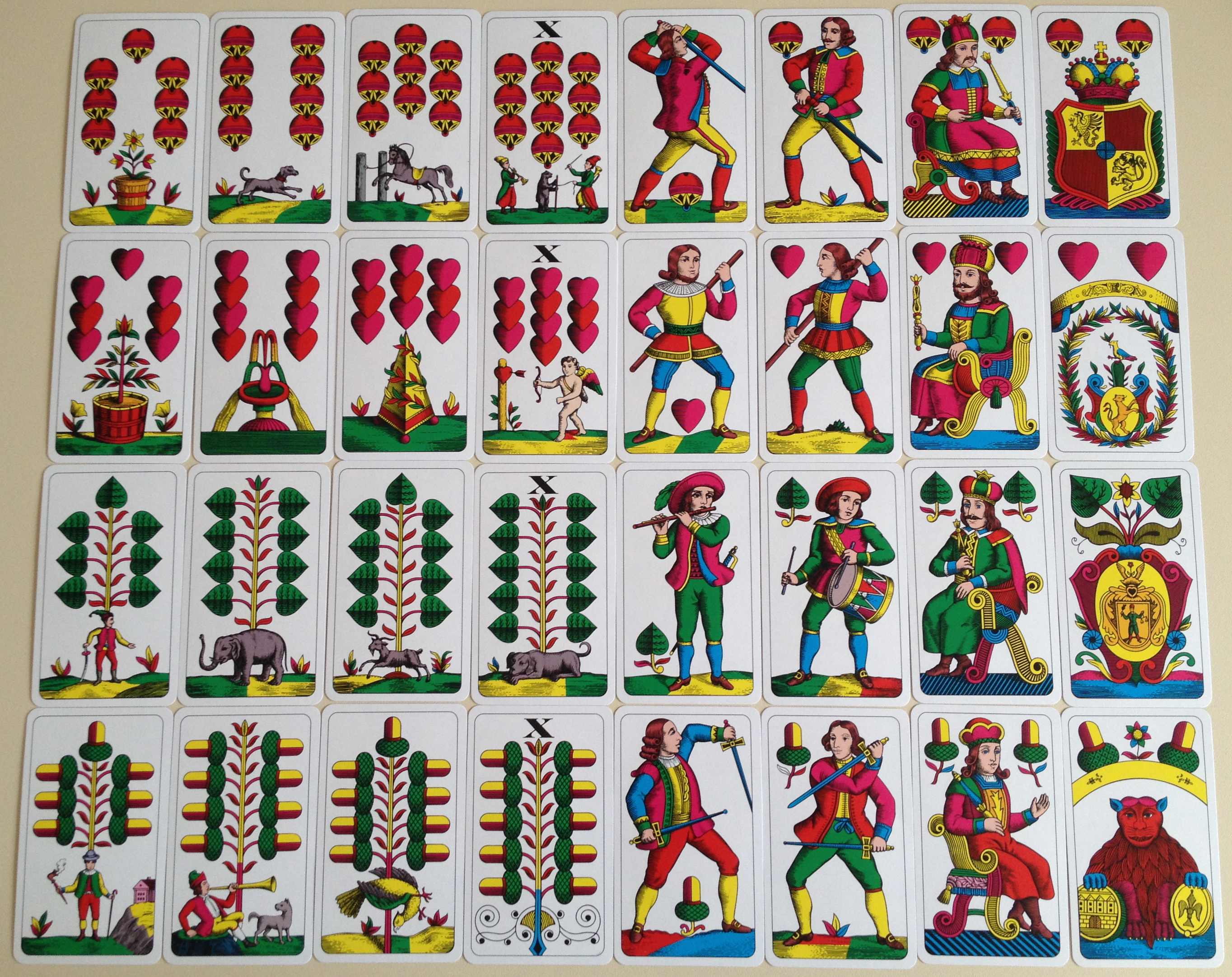
Bohemian pack traditionally used for Sedma

Normally a 32-card, German-suited, Bohemian-pattern pack is used; these are obtainable online. However, as in other games played with this pack it can be replaced by other German-suited cards, a French-suited Piquet pack comprising 32 cards from Ace to Seven in each suit. In extremis, a standard 52-card pack may be used from which 2s to 6s are removed.

The most powerful cards in the game are the Sevens because they beat all other cards; however, the only counting cards are Aces and Tens, which are worth 10 points each. This schedule appears to be a simplification of the usual schedule in ace–ten card games used, for example, by Ristikontra. Together with the 10 points awarded for winning the last trick, there are 90 points in a deal. The object is to win more than half of them, i.e. at least 50 points.

Card-point values
Rank	2	10	K	O	U	9	8	7
Value	10		–					

Otherwise the rank and suit of the cards has no significance in this game.

== Basic four-player rules ==
In the four-hand game, each pair of players sitting opposite one another forms a team and combines its points at the end. Partners may assist each other, but must not give advice, indicate the composition of their hands, etc.

Every player is dealt 4 cards. The remaining cards form a stock from which the players fill up their hands while it lasts.

Eldest hand leads any card to the first trick. The remaining players are completely free to play any card to the trick. The last player to play a card of the same rank as the card led wins the trick, is the first to replenish their cards from the stock, and leads to the next trick. The Sevens function as wild cards, i.e. they assume the rank of the first card in the trick. However, if a seven is led to a trick, it just represents a seven.

== Two- and three-hand games ==
Two can play without further adaptations.

If three play, 2 non-counting cards (usually an Eight and Nine) are removed from the pack before the game to make the number of cards divisible by three. The player who is dealt the 'Red King' (King of Hearts) or 'Green King' (King of Leaves) plays alone (it is prudent to hide possession of the Red King for as long as possible), against the other two whose points are combined at the end. In a three-player game, the "Red King" also acts as the Seven.

== Variations ==
- In the four-player game all cards may be dealt, so that a hand is 8 cards and there is no stock.
- A party wins double if it makes the opponents bald by winning all card-points (or all 90 points in the game), and it wins triple if it makes them naked by winning all tricks.
- Especially in a two-player game, once all players have played to a trick, the player who led the first card may keep it alive for another round. To do this, the player must play another card of the same rank as the first card in the trick (or a seven). In an extreme case, a single multi-trick can last until all hand cards have been used up even though there may still be cards in the stock. Players only fill up their hands after the multi-trick is over. Rules differ as to whether a player may keep a trick alive when it is currently owned by their partner.
- Sevens function as trumps rather than wild cards. Once a trick has been trumped, it can no longer be won by a regular card of the rank led. When playing with multi-tricks, a trumped trick can only be kept alive by another seven.
- In the four-player partnership game, communication between partners may be allowed so long as it only consists of one of the following four messages: "Take the trick", "Don't take it", "Smear it" (i.e. play an Ace or Ten), or "Don't smear it".
- In Romania, the card-point value of aces and tens is 1, not 10. Also, there are no points awarded for winning the last trick, so a 4–4 tie is possible.

== Hola ==
This game is very similar to Sedma, but like its more distant relative Ristikontra it is played with a full deck of 52 French-suited cards. In addition to the sevens, the twos are also wild cards. The multi-trick system is different. The player who led to a trick may always decide to 'fight' by leading to a new trick while the old one is still in the middle of the table. In this case the trick is kept in abeyance. This can be repeated until the players have no cards left. The new trick is won by matching the newly led card, but the winner also collects all the previous tricks that were held in abeyance.

Each party simply scores the number of points they won, with a bonus of 80 points for hola (naked) if a party won all tricks. If dealer's party scored the majority of points (50 or more), dealer deals again. Otherwise deal passes to the next player. The game is played for 200–500 points.

For this game also some variations have been described.

- If one party wins a single trick (possibly part of a multi-trick) consisting of all four cards of one rank, then the opposing team is 'burned', i.e. they have their total score reset to zero.
- There is no bonus for Hola. Instead, the opponents are 'burned'.
- Two can play without further adaptations. Six can play in two teams, seated alternately. In this case two full packs are used.
- For three players, a three can be removed to make the number of cards divisible by three.

== History ==
Hola is Ukrainian for naked. The game of this name is played among Ukrainian Canadians, but is believed to be of Polish origin. It has been estimated to date from around the middle of the 20th century, slightly earlier than Sedma.

Sedma and Șeptică are Czech and Romanian for seven and little seven, respectively (referring to the wild cards), and zsírozás is Hungarian for to fatten (referring to the play of aces or tens into tricks). This game may have originated in Hungary or Poland and found its way to Czechoslovakia in the middle of the 20th century or it may have come from Russia. It quickly became one of the most popular games in the country, together with the Crazy Eights variant Prší and a game called Žolík

== See also ==
- Brusquembille
- Laugh and Lie Down
- Lusti-Kartl'n
- Ristikontra
- Sedmice
