= Norseman's knock =

Classic Swedish card game

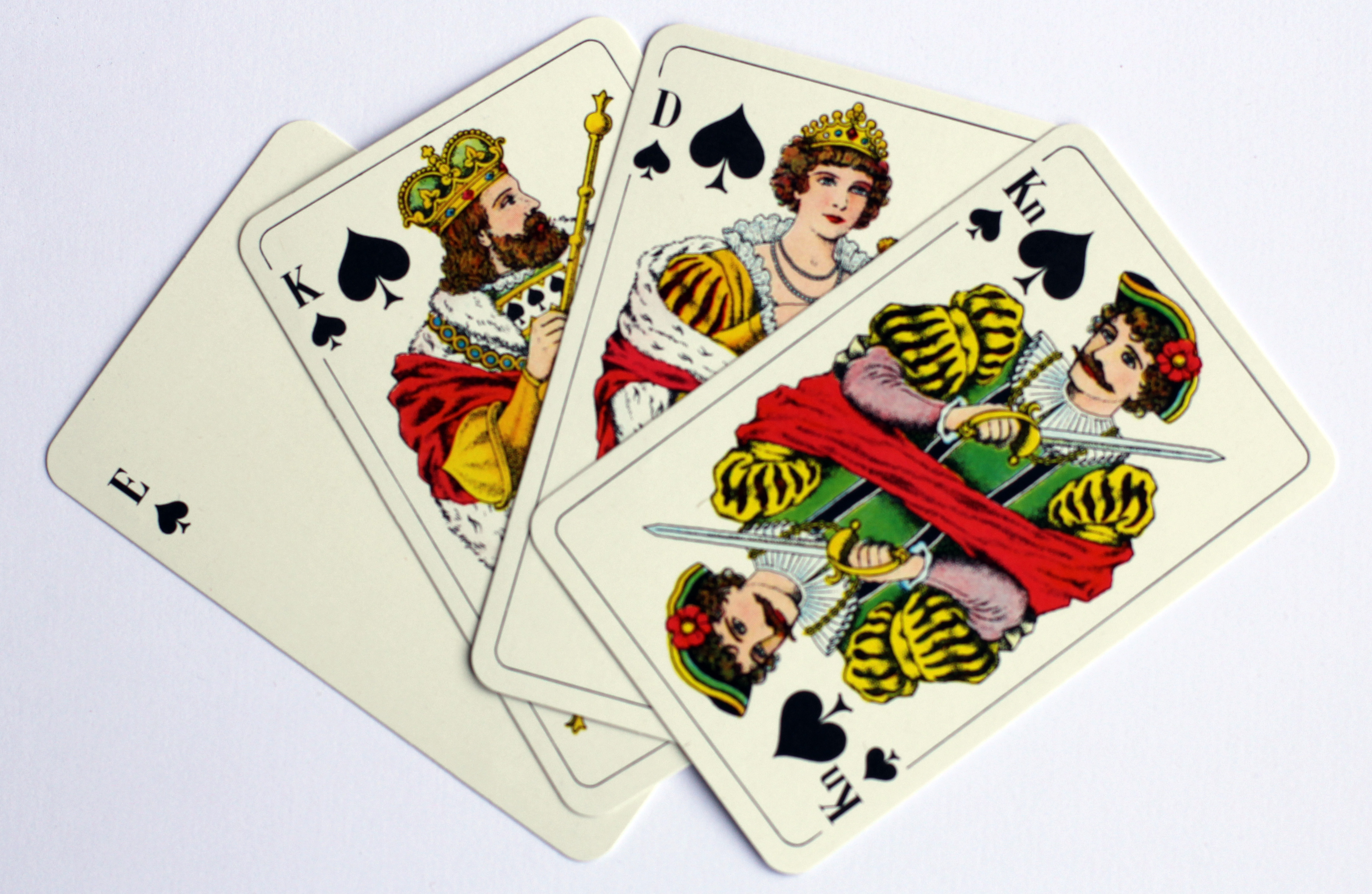
- The highest spades in a modern Swedish pattern pack
- Origin: Sweden
- Alternative names: Norrlandsknack
- Type: Plain-trick game
- Family: Rams group
- Players: 3-5
- Cards: 52
- Deck: Modern Swedish pattern, French-suited pack
- Rank (high→low): Natural (ace high)
- Play: Clockwise

Related games
- Rams • knack • köpknack • svängknack

Norseman's knock or Norrlandsknack is a classic Swedish card game for 3 to 5 players, known since the mid-1800s. It is traditionally played for money. The game is about winning as many tricks as possible and above all not being completely left without a trick.

== Background ==
A "distinctively Swedish member" of the rams family of games, Norrland is the northern part of Sweden and includes Lapland. In Finland, a similar game is known as ramina.

Norrlandsknack is also just called knack which, however, is a name also used for a similar card game.

== Rules ==
The following rules are based on spelregler.org augmented by Parlett.

=== Cards ===
A 52-card standard pack, typically of the modern Swedish pattern, is used with cards ranking from Ace (high) to Two (low).

=== Deal ===
Players are dealt five cards each and the next card is turned up to determine trumps. It belongs to the dealer who picks it up. The rest of the pack forms a talon. In the first deal, there is a bidding round, beginning with the player to the dealer's left, in which players in turn 'knock', i.e. knock or tap on the table, committing to take at least one trick, or 'lurk', i.e. play and hope to win one trick, but without penalty at this point. As soon as any player knocks, the bidding ends and players may now 'buy' i.e. exchange cards with the talon. Beginning with forehand, players discard any unwanted cards face down to one side and replenish their hands from the talon. The dealer, who took the trump upcard, discards first and then picks up one card fewer.

In subsequent deals, players may knock or pass, i.e. drop out of the current deal, but may not lurk.

=== Play ===
Forehand (to the left of the dealer) leads to the first trick. Players must follow suit if able; otherwise may trump or discard. The highest trump wins the trick or, if none are played, the highest card of the led suit. The trick winner leads to the next trick.

=== Scoring ===
Players start with a score of 10 points. For each trick taken, 1 point is deducted from the total score. Anyone who has played and not taken a trick is punished (with the exception of the first round) by getting a 'loaf', which means the player gets 5 extra penalty points. The winner of the game is the first to get down to 0 points.

In some rules, a player who fails to take a trick gets 5 penalty points if currently on 5 or below, otherwise the score reverts to 10 points. Also that when any player reaches 1 point, the rules of play change such that trumps must be played whenever possible.

If played for money, the participants place a stake in the pot at the start of the game, and in addition, a stake is paid for each loaf. The pot is taken home by the winner of the game.

== See also ==
- Knack
- Köpknack
- Svängknack
- Loo
- Trekort

== Literature ==
- Glimne, Dan (2016). Kortspelshandboken (3rd revised and expanded ed.). Stockholm: Kangaroo. pp. 250–251. ISBN 978-91-7663-115-7.
- Holmström, Björn (1981). Stora kortspelsboken. Stockholm: Prism. p. 178. ISBN 91-518-1446-3.
- Parlett, David (2008). The Penguin Book of Card Games. London: Penguin. ISBN 978-0-141-03787-5.
- Sevedsdotter, Åsa (1991). Lagt kort ligger. Stockholm: Info Books. p. 58-59. ISBN 91-7003-097-9.
