= Knack (card game) =

Swedish card game

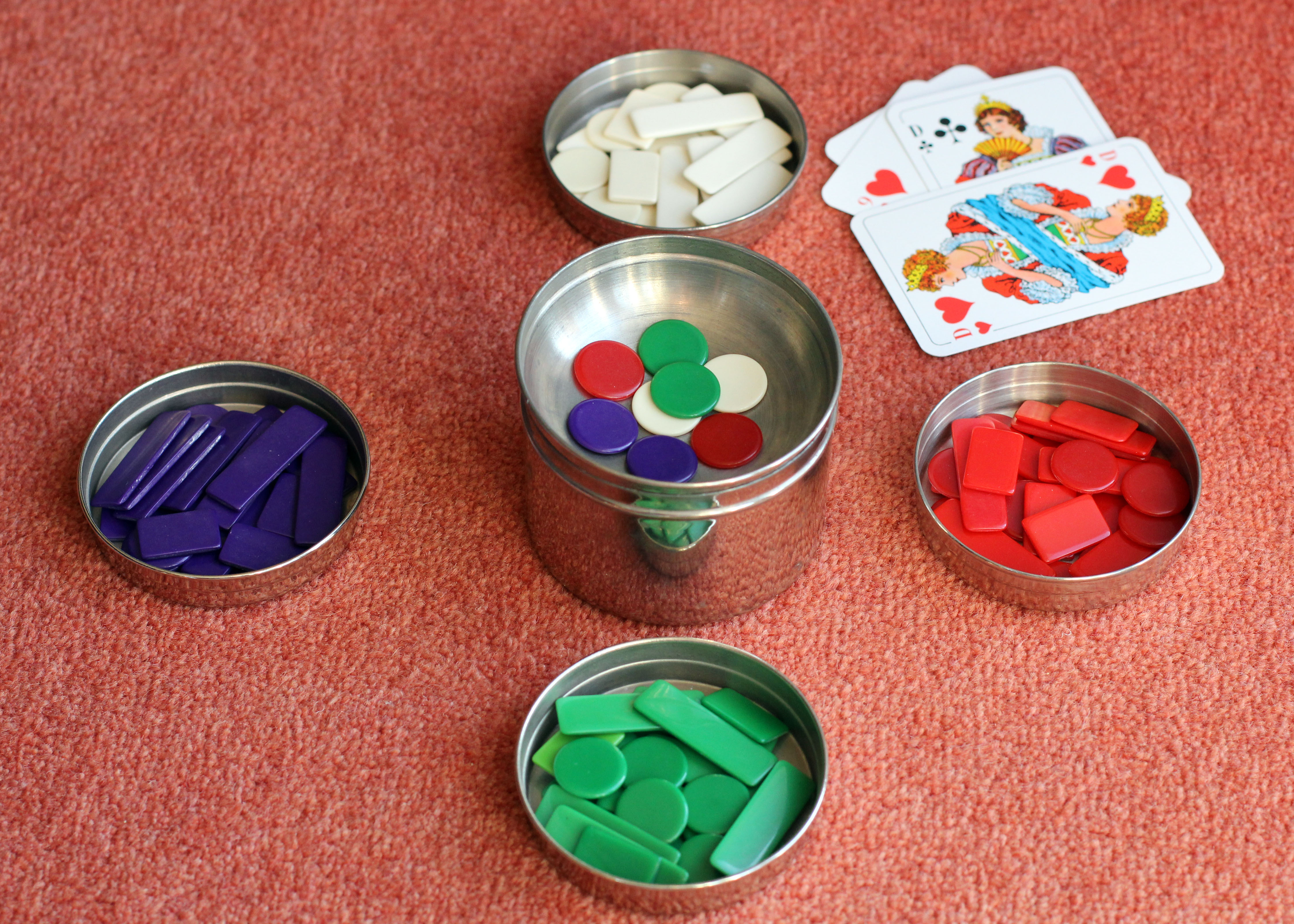
- A virapulla - traditional Swedish tin for holding gaming counters. The pot for the gaming stakes is in the reversible lid.
- Origin: Sweden
- Type: Plain-trick game
- Family: Rams group
- Players: 3-6
- Cards: 36
- Deck: Modern Swedish pattern, French-suited pack
- Rank (high→low): Natural (Ace high)
- Play: Clockwise

Related games
- Rams • Köpknack • Svängknack • Norseman's knock • Trekort

Knack is a Swedish card game, mainly played for money, in which the aim is to win at least one of the three tricks. It is also known as Trekort or Trikort, although that usually refers to a more basic game of Danish origin that is probably its progenitor.

Each deal begins with the dealer anteing an agreed stake into the pot. The players receive three cards each, and then a card is turned that indicates the trump suit. The remaining cards form a talon. Players who so wish, may exchange up to two cards for cards from the talon. In turn, the players then decide whether they want to play for the pot; if so, they announce this by knocking on the table and possibly also saying "knock". Alternatively they may fold without exchanging.

Players must follow suit if able. In the first trick, the trump Ace must be led if possible; otherwise any card may be led. In the second trick, a trump must be led if possible. Otherwise a side suit card should be led face down and regarded as the lowest trump; it wins if no-one else is able to trump it. The last trick is played as normal. The highest trump wins or, if none is played, the highest card of the led suit.

Each trick won is rewarded with a third of the pot. A player who has played for the pot but has not taken a trick must pay a full stake to the pot.

Knack has been known in Sweden at least since the early 1800s. The names Trekort and Trikort are also used for several other similar card games.

== See also ==
- Köpknack
- Svängknack
- Loo

== Literature ==
- Ericsson, Gustaf (1990). Folklivet i Åkers och Rekarne Härader. Part 2 (PDF). Uppsala: dialect and ancient memory archive. pp. 168–169. ISBN 91-85540-51-X. Archived from the original (PDF) on 2020-07-04.
- National Encyclopedia. Band 11. Höganäs: Good Books. 1993. p. 122. ISBN 91-7024-619-X.
