= Svängknack =

Swedish card game

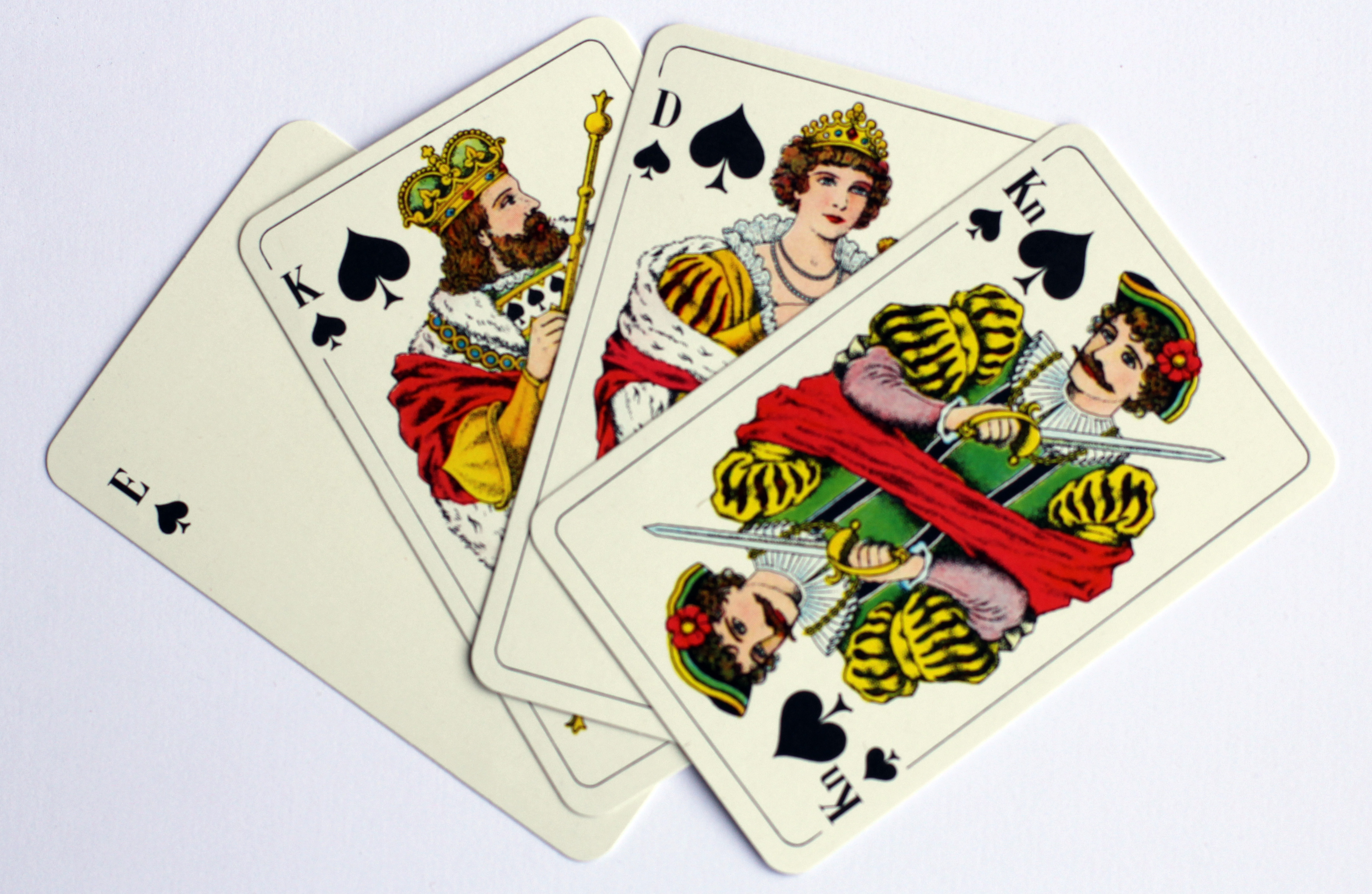
- The highest spades in a modern Swedish pattern pack
- Origin: Sweden
- Type: Plain-trick game
- Family: Rams group
- Players: 6-8
- Cards: 36
- Deck: Modern Swedish pattern, French-suited pack
- Rank (high→low): Natural (Ace high)
- Play: Clockwise

Related games
- Rams • Knack • Köpknack • Norseman's knock • Trekort

Svängknack ("swing knock") is a Swedish card game for 6 to 8 players that is a further development of Knack and, like the latter, is mainly played for money.

== Cards ==
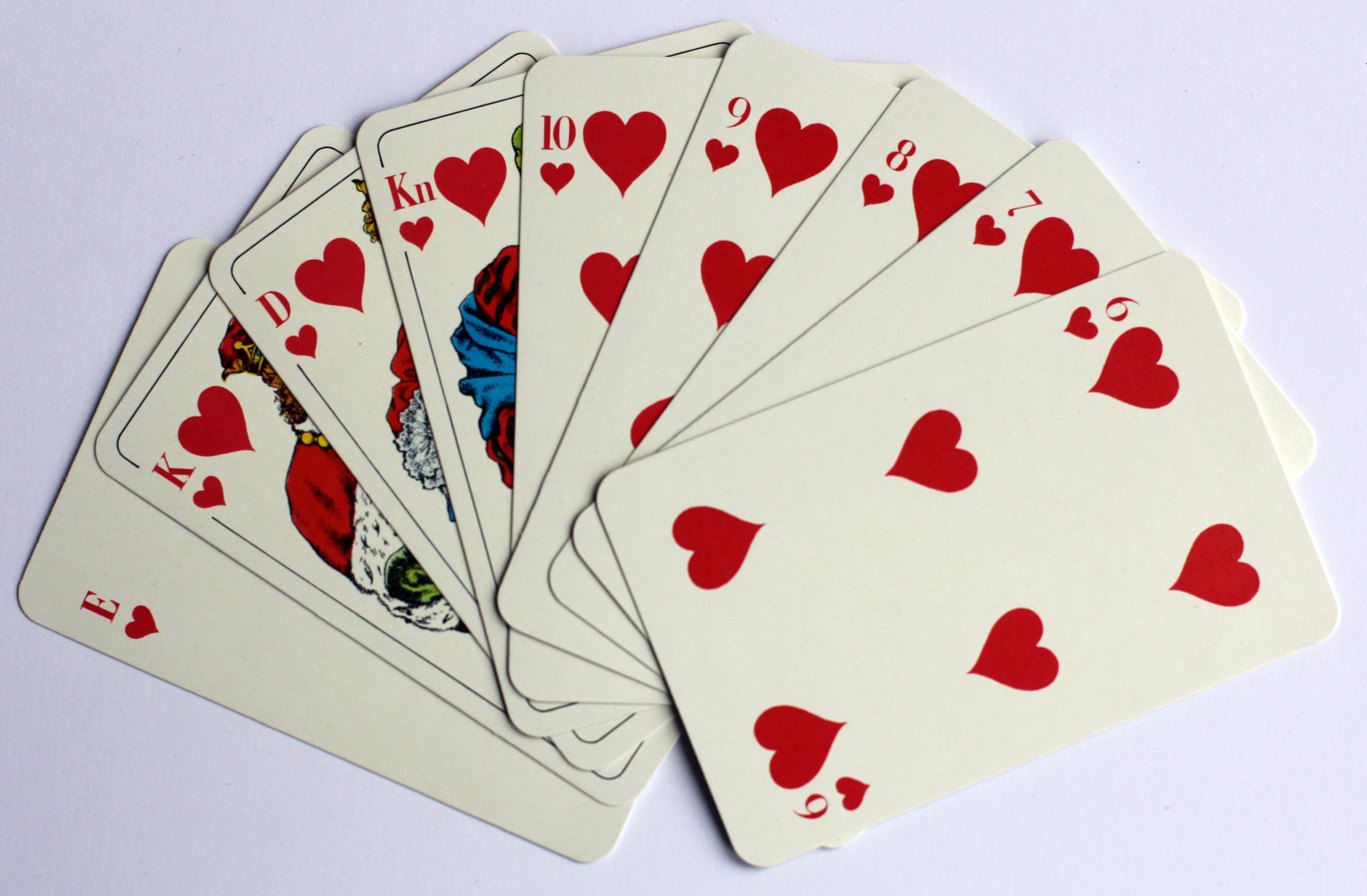
Shortened suits are used in Svängknack. Here: the suit of hearts.

A normal French-suited pack is used, normally of the modern Swedish pattern, from which the 2s, 3s, 4s and 5s are removed to leave 36 cards from the ace (high) down to the six.

== Deal and bidding ==
The dealer is chosen by lots and antes an agreed stake to the pot that is divisible by three. In each deal, three cards are dealt to each player. Then follows a calling round in which the first two players may, in turn, decide whether to "pass", that is, refrain from playing for the pot, or 'swing'. Swinging means to face two fresh cards from the talon and choose the trump suit from one of these cards. Once the trump suit has been chosen in this way, the calling proceeds with each subsequent player, in turn, opting to 'join' i.e. play or fold and thus drop out of the current deal. If both turnups are of the same suit a force is played in which all must participate but only provided the pot does not exceed a pre-agreed limit. If it does, the force is invalid. The swinger also has the option of turning just one card by announcing "I'll swing one". This also results in a force, unless the pot exceeds the limit.

If the second player has swung, the first is not allowed to play as he did not seize the opportunity to swing. However, the first player may announce "last man" at the outset which means he will join if B swings and everyone else folds. If all fold, the swinger sweeps the pot.

== Play ==
The game for the pot involves trick-taking with strict rules on how the cards may be played. The swinger leads to the first trick and must play the trump Ace if he has it. Players must follow suit or trump if unable. For each trick taken, you win a third of the pot. Players who have joined but have not taken a trick pay a penalty instead.

== Winning ==
Each trick taken earns ⅓ of the pot. If three play and each takes a trick, "the pot goes out" and the next dealer places the agreed ante in the pot for the next deal. Otherwise, each player who fails to take a trick pays the full stake to the pot for the next deal. The dealer still has to pay the agreed ante.

== See also ==
- Knack
- Köpknack
- Loo
- Norseman's knock

== Literature ==
- Tjugoett: spelregler för tjugoett intressanta och trevliga sällskapsspel. Malmö: Printer Agency. 1950. pp. 21–22.
