= Ristikontra =

Finnish point-trick card game

- A point-trick game in which tricks are won by matching rank
- Alternative names: Ristiklappi
- Type: Trick-taking
- Players: 2×2
- Cards: 52
- Play: Clockwise

Related games
- Sedma

Ristikontra or ristiklappi, sometimes translated as cross-clap, is a Finnish point-trick game for four players using a standard 52-card pack. Card suits do not play a role in this game, and there is no ranking order. A trick is won by the last player to play a card of the same rank as the card led.

The game is a highly unusual member of the ace–ten family, immediately related only to the Central European card game known as Sedma, Hola or Zsírozás.

== Basic rules ==
Point-values of cards
Rank	A	10	K	Q	J	9	8	7	6	5	4	3	2
Value	11	10	4	3	2	–							

The game is played by four players in fixed partnerships, sitting crosswise. A standard pack of 52 cards is used. The suits are irrelevant for this game, and the ranks are not ordered in a hierarchy. The cards have the card-point values that are standard for games of the ace–ten family: ace 11, king 4, queen 3, jack 2, ten 10. There are 120 card-points in the pack. The object of the game is to win more than half the card-points in tricks, i.e. at least 61 points. A party that wins all card-points wins double.

Every player is dealt 6 cards. The remaining cards form a stock from which the players fill up their hands while it lasts.

Eldest hand leads any card to the first trick. The remaining players are completely free in which card to play to the trick. The last player to play a card of the same rank as the card led wins the trick and leads to the next trick. While the stock lasts, after each trick the players fill up their hands, starting with the winner of the trick.

Instead of playing a card from their hand, players also have the option of playing in the dark by playing the top card of the stock instead of a hand card. In this case they do not draw a card when the trick is over, as their hand is already complete.

== Variations ==
Point-values of cards
Rank	A	K	Q	J	10	9	8	7	6	5	4	3	2
Value	5	4	3	2	1	–							

- Card ranks are sometimes assigned the alternative card-point values ace 5, king 4, queen 3, jack 2 and ten 1. In this case tens are low and there are 60 card-points in the pack, and 31 are needed to win the game.
- When both parties have the same number of card-points, the number of tricks may be used to break the tie.
- No player may lead with the same rank to four consecutive tricks.
- A player who won a trick with a hand card (as opposed to one from the stock), has the right to spice the trick by replacing the winning card with the card drawn from the stock.
- Players play with a hand of 5 cards rather than 6.
- Any party that has won a trick containing a queen in the first phase of trick-play, must clean in the second phase. The second phase starts as soon as the stock is empty. To clean, the party must win a trick containing king, but must not win it with a queen. So that this remains possible, it is not allowed to play the last king in the first phase. A party that is obliged to clean but fails to do so loses dishonourably and may not touch the cards until the cards have been dealt for the next round.
