= German Skat Association =

German umbrella organisation for skat clubs

- Deutscher Skatverband
- Abbreviation: DSkV
- Founded: 12 March 1899
- Headquarters: Altenburg, Germany
- Members: c. 26,000
- Chairman: Peter Tripmaker (president)
- Website: www.dskv.de

The German Skat Association (German: Deutscher Skatverband) or DSkV is the umbrella organisation for German Skat clubs. It was founded on 12 March 1899 in Halle an der Saale and the headquarters of the club is the Skat town of Altenburg. From 1954 to 2001, Bielefeld was the location of the Association's headquarters due to the division of Germany. The offices in Bielefeld were closed in 2005; since then, Altenburg has once again become the only head office location.

== Organisation ==
Together with the International Skat Players Association (ISPA), the DSkV determines the international rules of Skat. An important organ of the club is the German Skat Court (Deutsches Skatgericht), which rules on disputes in tournament games. In addition, it organises open tournaments and the German Skat Championships.

The German Skat Association has almost 26,000 members, organised into 13 state associations and 1,666 clubs. The DSkV organises German championships for individuals, teams and pairs. There are also open tournaments in which any interested Skat player may take part - without having to prove membership of a club (German Ladies Cup, German Mixed Championship, Germany Cup and the biennial International DSkV Skat Cup). As well as these tournaments there is a league system, that is divided into federal (Bundesligen) and regional leagues (Regionalligen). There are also parallel competitions because the IPSA, in addition to its focus on the World and European Skat Championships is also the organiser of German championships for individuals and teams, and its own federal league.

== See also ==
- History of Skat
- British Skat Association
- German Doppelkopf Association
