= History of Skat =

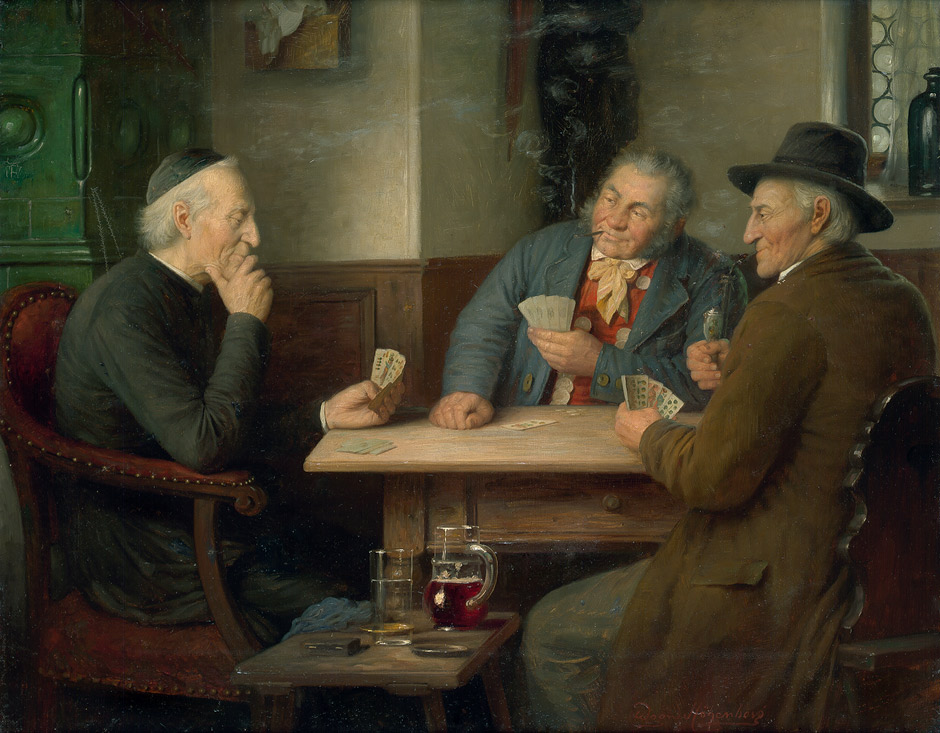
Die Skatpartie ("The Skat Session") by Josef Wagner-Höhenberg

The history of the game of Skat or Scat began in the early 19th century in Thuringia. The game spread rapidly within German-speaking Europe and also in the US and is now one of the most popular card games in Germany as well as being considered Germany's national card game.

== History ==
=== Beginnings ===
The early history of the game of Skat has been well researched, although some theories about its origins cannot be proven or have since been discredited. In particular, the once popular anecdote that Friedrich Ferdinand Hempel, a well known Altenburg lawyer, simply invented Skat himself one evening having become bored with a game of Solo has since been discredited by Oskar Stein (1887), although subsequent research has shown that Hempel (along with his namesake J.F.L. Hempel) had a hand in its development.

What is certain is that the game was developed between 1810 and 1813 in the Thuringian town of Altenburg from older card games. The concept of bidding appears to be derived from L'Hombre through its simpler German version, Solo; the idea of setting aside two cards (the skat) was taken from the Tarot game of Grosstarock. Doppelkopf, however, is not one of Skat's precursors but a 19th century development of the double-pack games in German Schafkopf.

The first Skat players and 'inventors' of the game were Altenburg dignitaries and members of a local Tarock club: grammar school teacher (Gymnasialprofessor) Johann Friedrich Ludwig Hempel (1773-1849), medical health officer (Medizinalrat) Dr. Hans Carl Leopold Schuderoff, court advocate and notary Friedrich Ferdinand Hempel (1778-1836), Councillor Carl Christian Adam Neefe (1774-1821) and Chancellor Hans Carl Leopold von der Gabelentz (1778–1831). Another participant in the rounds was well-known publisher, Friedrich Arnold Brockhaus. The game was first known as Ore Mountain Schafkopf (Erzgebirgischer Schafkopf).

Von der Gabelentz's scores in these games have survived and can be seen in the Thuringian State Archive in Altenburg. In a notebook he listed his gaming losses and winnings in detail from 1798 to 1829, so that, even today, his gaming results are clear. On 4 September 1813 the term Scat appeared for the first time in this account. A further verifiable written record of the new game can be found in an article about Osterland games in edition no. 30 of the weekly Osterländische Blätter published in Altenburg on 25 July 1818 under the heading "Das Skadspiel". In the years that followed the game spread more and more, especially among the students of Thuringian and Saxon universities and was soon popular in large parts of German-speaking Europe.

The earliest recorded rules for "Scat" were written down by one of its inventors, "Hp" (J.F.L. Hempel), for Pierer and von Binzer's 1833 Encyclopädisches Wörterbuch, (Note: Oskar Stein (1887) tracked down "Hp" who turned out to be the schoolmaster and Skat inventor J.F.L. Hempel.) by when it was already popular in the Kingdom of Saxony, especially in the Duchy of Altenburg and the surrounding area. These describe a game for 3 players with German-suited cards who received 10 each in packets of 3, 2, 3 and 2, the two remaining cards being dealt to the table as a talon known as the Scat. There were just two contracts – Frage and Solo – and forehand opened the bidding or passed. A Frage bidder could be overcalled by a Solo and either could be overcalled by the same contract in a higher-ranking suit, the suits ranking in the same order as in the modern game. The declarer needed 61 card points to win and there were bonuses for scoring 90 (Schneider), taking all tricks (Schwarz) and, optionally, for holding or lacking matadors in unbroken sequence from the top. The four Unters were permanent trumps ranking above the trump suit.

The first treatise on the rules of Skat, Das Scatspiel: Nebst zwei Liedern, was published in 1848, also by J. F. L. Hempel, shortly before his death. Nevertheless, more and more variations and regional peculiarities of the game developed; the rules thus differed from one region to another until the first attempt to set them in order was made by a congress of Skat players on 7 August 1886 in Altenburg. These were the first official rules finally published in a book form in 1888 by Theodor Thomas of Leipzig. The current rules, followed by both the International Skat Players Association, German Skat Federation and British Skat Association, date from Jan. 1, 1999.

Because of the poor economic conditions and lack of political freedom in many German states, Germany was a classic emigration region in the 19th century and many emigrants took the game with them to their new homeland.

=== First Skat congresses and foundation of German Skat Association ===
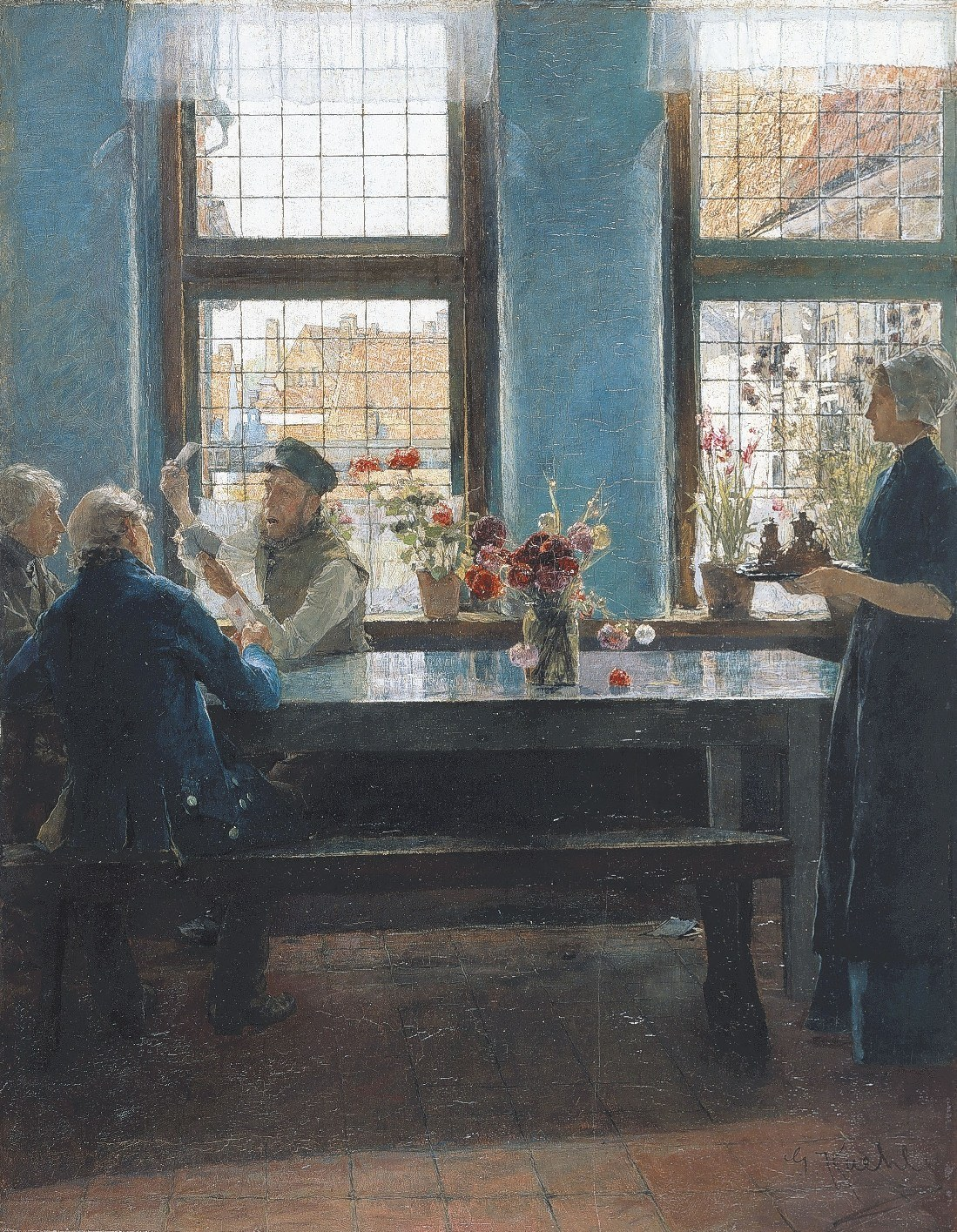
Men playing Skat in a Lübeck house around 1885

The first 70 years were a success story. The game spread and won more and more supporters from all social classes, but suffered from a confusion of local and regional rules. There was a danger that Skat would disintegrate into many new games.

In the 1870s important new movements began, which led to the rules being unified and later simplified. The founding of the Empire accelerated this process in many ways. During the boom of the Gründerzeit period, the game was able to spread throughout Germany unhindered by the old borders, but this also encouraged uncontrolled growth. In the rapidly expanding towns and the huge factories many people from different parts of the German Empire met and came into social contact. In addition, supra-regional player associations could be formed in the new unitary state, which ultimately led to the foundation of the German Skat Association.

In 1884, Freiherr von Hirschfeld published an Illustriertes Scatbuch (Illustrated Scat Book). One year later followed the set of rules, Illustriertes Lehrbuch des Scatspiels ("Illustrated Textbook of the Scat Game") by county court councillor, Karl Buhle. In 1886, on the occasion of an industrial fair in Altenburg, a big Skat tournament was held. The event led to the first Skat Congress. About a thousand participants decided the General German Rules of Skat (Allgemeine Deutsche Skatordnung), which was based on the aforementioned book by Buhle. At this time there were two fundamentally different playing methods. One variant was called Altenburg Suit Bidding (Altenburger Farbenreizen) and the other Leipzig Point Bidding (Leipziger Zahlenreizen). The participants of the first Skat Congress could not agree a compromise between the two varieties, which is why no association was founded. The second Skat Congress also failed due to this issue.

In 1887, the Skat Congress tried unsuccessfully to mandate German-suited cards for the game. But as Stein pointed out, there were vast areas of Germany that had largely gone over to French-suited cards. (Note: In 1887, Stein gives the percentages of 32-card, German-suited packs sold to the various German states as follows: Saxe-Thuringia 90%, Prussian Silesia 80%, Saxony 50%, Brandenburg and Posen 5%, Prussia 3%, Pomerania 2%, Hanover, Rhineland and Westphalia ½%, Schleswig-Holstein and Hesse-Nassau 0.5%. Note that this list excludes states like Baden, Bavaria and Württemberg that would have used 36-card German-suited packs.)

On 12 March 1899, in Halle (Saale) at the Third Skat Congress, the German Skat Association was founded. Those present could still not agree on a final set of rules. Although suit bidding was declared an official form of the game, point bidding was still allowed. The Congress chose Altenburg as the headquarters of the new association.

A year earlier a comparable association had been founded in the United States: the North American Skat League. Skat had been played in the USA since at least 1876.

Up to the outbreak of the First World War, seven further Skat congresses followed, at which further rules, such as Null contracts, were defined. However, two points of contention could not be resolved: the method of bidding remained an acute issue which even a prize awarded in 1907 could not change. The second problem was that there was no agreement on a uniform Skat pack.

=== Introduction of modern standard Skat ===
During the First World War, point bidding spread among the German soldiers. More and more variants developed. In the trenches men of different regional and social backgrounds met one another. If they wanted to play together, they had to find compromises between their domestic rules, which again led to new variations. In view of the situation that one would perhaps no longer be able to experience the settlement of the next round, the game increasingly took on the features of a game of chance with ever higher stakes.

Conservative skat players, who clung to the suit bidding, pejoratively referred to the point bidding game of the simple soldiers as Trench Skat.

Nevertheless, the codification of the basic rules for point bidding is thanks to a declared follower of the classic Altenburg suit bidding system. In 1924, the author of numerous Skat books and bookkeeper of the German Skat Association, Artur Schubert, published fixed rules for Gucki-Skat based on point bidding. In 1922, Schubert still rejected point bidding because the distribution of cards and the position of Jacks or Unters can already be guessed while bidding. He described the rules of the unpopular game variant in order to prevent further diversification.

In 1927 and 1928, after a break of 18 years, two Skat congresses were held in Altenburg. Apart from the details, the rule changes decided upon are the basis of today's game. At the 11th Skat Congress, point bidding was agreed as the official and only playing method, settling a 40-year-old dispute. Another important decision was the establishment of a committee for disputes, from which the German Skat Court emerged. At the 12th Skat Congress the following year, the New German Skat Rules were passed. After the 12th Skat Congress, the basic rules of the game were only changed in detailed questions such as certain base values and scoring.

Not only did the First World War change the bidding system, but it also helped to establish Skat as Germany's pre-eminent card game. As Grünberg noted in north Germany in 1938 "before the war we mostly played Solo. Now everyone plays Skat. Only in the pub, when there is a lot of conversation is a social game of cards played, and that game is called 'Knüffelen'".

=== Recent history ===
At the following two congresses, the values of the Null and normal Grand contracts, which are still valid today, were determined. It was also decided that Hand games would not be penalised twice and that the basic value of the Grand Ouvert would be 36. Another innovation was the regulation introduced in 1936 at the suggestion of Otto Seeger that every game won would be rewarded with a bonus of 50 points.

At the first Skat Congress after the Second World War, Altenburg-based President, Erich Fuchs, was confirmed in office. When he left East Germany in 1953, Bielefeld became the central seat of the German Skat Association. The following congresses brought further rule refinements like e.g. the expanded Seeger and Fabian scoring system.

Since there was also a desire in East Germany for a central authority to settle disputes, the Skataktiv was formed in Altenburg in 1963 to replace the Skat Court. The Altenburgers then adopted the western rule changes, so that despite the division of Germany there was a common rule basis in East and West.

In the early 1970s, the International Skat Players Association (ISPA) was founded, which interpreted some rules differently than the German Skat Association. The two competing associations could not reach a consensus. The conflict escalated when the German Skat Association banned its members from double membership in both associations in 1978. Since then, ISPA has mainly been responsible for the organisation of the annually alternating World and European Skat Championships, but its subdivision ISPA Germany and the DSkV organise their own German individual and team championships and leagues. In 1980 the company Novag Industries launched Skat Champion, the world's first electronic Skat computer, on the German market. The device was strictly programmed according to the rules of the German Skat Association. However, Skat computers were not able to assert themselves permanently.

After German reunification in 1990, the East German clubs joined the German Skat Association again. The Skat Association tried to resolve the old dispute over playing cards with a compromise using a new French-suited, Berlin pattern pack with German suit colours and known as the Tournament pattern.

The conflict between the German Skat Association and ISPA was also resolved amicably in 1998. Both players' associations adopted the International Skat Regulations. Hand games have been penalised twice since then and the basic value of the Grand Ouvert has been set at 24. In addition, the players' associations formed the International Skat Court jointly in 2001, whose seat is in Altenburg.

In 2005, the office of the German Skat Association in Bielefeld was closed and moved to its historical headquarters in Altenburg in accordance with the resolutions of the 28th Skat Congress.

== Overview of Skat congresses ==
Between 1886 and 2006 there were 29 Skat Congresses. The German Skat Association was founded at the third Skat Congress. Important congresses are marked in bold:

	Year	Venue	Important decisions and events
**I**	1886	Altenburg	The Allgemeine Deutsche Skatordnung ("General German Skat Regulations") are agreed. No association is founded because there is no agreement over the Altenburg suit bidding system (Altenburger Farbenreizen) and Leipzig point bidding (Leipziger Zahlenreizen).
II	1887	Leipzig	The point of dispute over the method of bidding is unable to be resolved.
**III**	1899	Halle (Saale)	The German Skat Associations is founded. Head office in Altenburg. Suit bidding is officially recognised. Point bidding remains an alternative. The Deutsche Skatzeitung ("German Skat Paper") is founded as the official magazine.
IV	1901	Magdeburg	A statute formulated by Artur Schubert is adopted. There is no agreement on the pack to be used.
V	1902	Leipzig	The Allgemeine Deutsche Skatordnung by Artur Schubert is accepted as 'provisionally valid'. Neither the bidding issue nor the question of the pack to be used are decided.
VI	1903	Altenburg	Values for Null contracts are laid down.
VII	1906	Dresden	
VIII	1907	Halle	A prize is announced. The aim is to find a compromise between suit and point bidding. Nevertheless, no acceptable compromise is found.
IX	?	?	?
X	1909	Leipzig	The majority of the board insists on suit bidding. The members favour point bidding. No compromise can be found.
	-	Dresden	The originally planned 11th Congress is cancelled because there is no agreement over bidding. The outbreak of the First World War prevents further discussions for the time being.
**XI**	1927	Altenburg	Point bidding prevails. A committee is formed for disputes, which is the nucleus of the German Skat Court.
XII	1928	Altenburg	The Neue Deutsche Skatordnung by Richard Burkhardt is accepted.
XIII	1932	Altenburg	Null games are given the game values still valid today. The basic value of Grand is set at 24. Grand Ouvert is given a basic value of 36. Lost hand games are not penalized, i.e. they are simply calculated negatively. In open contracts, all ten cards must be shown immediately.
XIV	1936	Altenburg	According to a suggestion by Otto Seeger, each game won is rewarded with a bonus of 50 points in addition to the game value.
XV	1950	Bielefeld	Although the congress takes place in the western part of the divided Germany, Erich Fuchs, the former president of the congress in East Germany, is confirmed in office. For the time being, the executive committee remains in Altenburg in East Germany. In 1953, Fuchs leaves for the west. The seat of the association also moves to the West. Between 1953 and 2002 the headquarters of the German Skat Association is in Bielefeld.
XVI	1954	Bielefeld	
XVII	1958	Bielefeld	The German Skat Association registers in the Register of Associations of the Federal Republic of Germany.
XVIII	1962	Bielefeld	The Seeger and Fabian expanded system is adopted. As an extension to the "Seeger Points" introduced in 1936, the defenders also receive a bonus for lost games. The inventor of the new accounting system, Johannes Fabian, is elected president of the German Skat Association. The Skataktiv formed in 1963 in Altenburg takes over the rule changes from the West. Both German states continue to play according to the same rules.
XIX	1966	Bielefeld	
XX	1970	Bielefeld	
XXI	1974	Bad Oeynhausen	
	1975	Cologne	Extraordinary Congress.
**XXII**	1978		The conflict with the International Skat Federation escalates. The Congress prohibits double membership in both federations.
XXIII	1982	Munich	
XXIV	1986	Cologne	
**XXV**	1990	Hamburg	The German Skat Association is restructured. The regional associations of the former East Germany join the German Skat Association. There are first proposals to solve the problem of playing cards, which had not been solved at the 4th Skat Congress, by a compromise with French symbols and German suits.
XXVI	1994	Schneverdingen	It is decided to conduct negotiations with the International Skat Federation on the unification of the regulations. An association agreement with the Polish Skat Association is adopted.
**XXVII**	1998	Halle	The currently valid International Skat Regulations will be jointly agreed with the International Skat Federation. Lost hand games will be punished. The basic value 36 for a Grandouvert will be reduced to 24.
XXVIII	2002	Papenburg	The most important decision is the relocation of the association's headquarters to Altenburg.
XXIX	2006	Altenburg	
XXX	2010	Hanover	
XXXI	2014	Berlin	
XXXII	24/25 Nov 2018	Bonn	
XXXIII	19/20 Nov 2022	Königslutter	The International Skat Rules are changed. An opponent may only put his hand down openly if the soloist cannot take a trick, regardless of the play of the soloist and the other defender. Otherwise the remaining tricks belong to the soloist.

== Basic development of Skat rules ==
=== Early development ===
In the first game variants, the dealer always received the two surplus cards and became a soloist. The trumps consisted permanently of the Unters (Jacks) and, as in Wendish Schafkopf and most contracts of modern Doppelkopf, Bells (Diamonds). The soloist's only privilege was that he could discard two less useful cards. Otherwise, the dealer was forced to play and had no influence on the type of game. Under these rules, the soloist had to play even if he did not have a single trump or Ace in his hand. Of course, most solo games were lost.

In the next stage of development, the pack was cut and the bottom card determined the trump suit. So the dealer/soloist had at least one trump. To determine the trump suit, the lowest card had to be revealed, so that the other players knew at least one card held by the soloist.

Since this solution was not satisfactory either, and idea by Carl Christian Adam Neefe was adopted whereby an auction was held to determine the soloist and trump suit. By bidding, however, further types of contract other than the basic suit contracts became possible.

Early forms of Null and Grand were already being played in the 1840s. The Null was, from the outset, a plain-trick game and basically resembled its modern successor. The predecessor of Grand was called Ace Game (As-Spiel); it was the counterpart to Null and also had no trumps.

=== Suit bidding ===
The main difference between Altenburg suit bidding (Altenburger Farbenreizen) and the point bidding system used today was that the suit bidding offered only the basic values of the games. Except in special cases, a player could not be overbid by an unfavourable Unter/Jack in the Skat, since the position of the Unters was not taken into account when bidding. "Matadors" (Spitzen) were not taken into account until after the game.

In addition, the game types differed from today's:

Contract	Description
Frage	The Frage (pronounced "frar-ger") contract corresponded to today's normal suit contract. The soloist picked up the skat, discarded 2 cards and then announced the trump suit. Null and Grand were not valid for Frage. The base values of the contracts were: 1 for Bells Frage (Frage in Schellen), 2 for a Red Frage (Frage in Rot), 3 for a Green Frage (Frage in Grün) and 4 for an Acorn (Frage in Eichel).
Tourné (Wendespiel)	Modern Skat have no equivalent of this contract. The soloist flipped one of the two cards of the skat and showed it to the defenders. The suit of that card became the trump suit. If the card was an Unter (Unter, Wenzel or Bube), the soloist could choose whether to accept the suit of the Unter or to announce a Grand Tourné. If the card was a Seven, the soloist could sometimes choose between the suit of the Seven and a Null Tourné. The basic values were: 5 for a Bell Tourné (Schell tourné), 6 for a Red Tourné (Rot tourné), 7 for a Green Tourné (Grün tourné), 8 for an Acorn Tourné (Eichel tourné) and 12 for a Grand Tourné (Grand tourné).
Solo	The Solo corresponded to the present Suit Hand contract. The soloist announced trumps without viewing the skat. The basic values were: 9 for a Bell Solo (Schell solo), 10 for a Red Solo (Rot solo), 11 for a Green Solo (Grün solo) and 12 for an Acorn Solo (Eichel solo).
Grand Solo and Grand Ouvert	There was also a Grand Solo which was the equivalent of the modern Grand Hand. The Grand Ouvert was a hand contract just like today and included an announced schwarz. The basic values were 16 for a Grand Solo and 24 for a Grand Ouvert.
Null and Null Ouvert	The Null was basically a Null Solo and thus the same as a present-day Null Hand. The Null Ouvert was like a modern Null Ouvert Hand. There were no counterparts of the modern simple Null with skat pick-up or modern Null Ouvert with skat pick-up. The basic game values were: 20 for a Null Solo and 40 for a Null Ouvert.

=== Point bidding ===
Little is known about the early history and origins of point bidding. The first Skat Congress failed in its attempt to found an all-German Skat Association because its participants could not agree on a compromise between suit bidding and point bidding. This suggests that point bidding was already widespread in 1886. In the Skat Rules of the first Skat Congress under §26 point bidding is covered in two sentences:

"By agreement or local use it may also be agreed that bidding from the Solo onwards (i.e. in the case of hand games) may be based, not the ranking of the contracts, but the number of points to be calculated each time for the individual contract (bidding based on Werth). Here, the regulations in §23, paragraphs 3 to 5 are to be applied analogously.".[sic]

This rule explains today's suit values (9, 10, 11 and 12), because these were the basic values of Suit Solo games.

The next step was to extend point bidding to the other contracts. This meant inter alia that the Tourné contract no longer made any sense, because its game value was not predictable.

== Skat honoured in philately ==
In 1967, East Germany issued a special series of postage stamps on the theme of German Playing Cards with pictures of the Jack/Unter of the German and Altenburg pattern pack. In 1986, the Deutsche Bundespost issued a special stamp on the occasion of the 100th anniversary of the first German Skat Congress. On 5 September 2013, Deutsche Post issued a special 90-cent stamp under the motto of 200 Jahre Skat ("200 years of Skat"). The design was by graphical artist, Christoph Niemann from Berlin.

== Literature ==
- Grünberg, Peter (1938). "Knüffeln" in Die Heimat, Vol. 48, No. 1. Heimat und Erbe, Flensburg, pp. 27/28.
- Pierer, Heinrich August and August Daniel von Binzer (1833). Encyclopädisches Wörterbuch der Wissenschaften, Künste und Gewerbe, Vol. 19 (S–Schlüpfrig). Altenburg: Literatur-Comptoir.
- Pierer, HA (1835). Universal-Lexikon oder vollständiges encyclopädisches Wörterbuch, 18th volume (S-Schlüpfrig), Altenberg: Pierer.
- Stein, Oskar (1887). Geschichte des Skatspiels ["History of the Game of Skat"]. Berlin: Wilhelm Baensch.
