= Glossary of Skat terms =

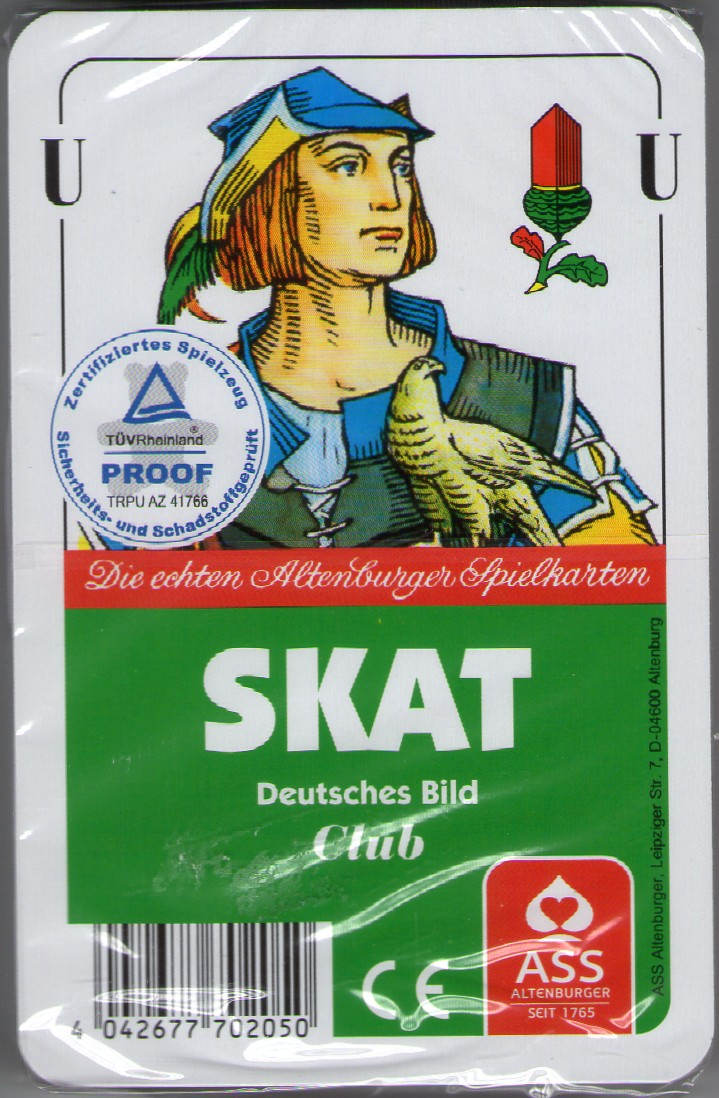
A Skat pack

The following is a glossary of Skat terms used in playing the card game of Skat. Although Skat has German origins, it has now become an international game, often played to official rules. This glossary includes terms which are common or regional, official or unofficial, as well as those used for special situations, starting hands, card combinations and terms relating to players. Many of the terms are also used in other trick-taking or ace–ten games or even in card games in general.

== Commonly used terms ==
=== Playing positions ===
Forehand, middlehand and rearhand (3 players)

The following terms are recognised by the International Laws of Skat or Skatordnung:

- Dealer: the person who shuffles and deals the cards
- Forehand: the person on the left of the dealer in Skat and who is first to be dealt cards.
- Middlehand: the person left of forehand and right of rearhand and who is the second player to be dealt cards.
- Rearhand or endhand: the person who is last to receive his cards. In a three-hand game this is also the dealer. In a four-hander, it is the person on the right of the dealer

The following terms are also commonly used in connection with the bidding phase:

- Hörer (Hearer): Forehand. The hearer hears the bid of the speaker or 2nd speaker.
- Sager (1st bidder): middlehand; the bidder makes the first bid to the hearer.
- Weitersager (2nd bidder): rearhand; the 2nd bidder bids to the hearer if the 1st bidder has dropped out, or to the 1st bidder if the hearer has dropped out.
- Soloist or declarer: the player who wins the auction and plays alone against the two defenders
- Defender or opponent: one of the two adversaries of the soloist.

=== Contracts ===
==== Official contracts ====
Contracts permitted by the Skatordnung are:

- Suit: contract in which the soloist attempts to score at least 61 points. Trumps are the four Jacks or Unters and a suit announced by the soloist
- Grand: only the Jacks or Unters are trumps
- Null: contract in which there are no trumps and the soloist tries to avoid winning any tricks

==== Unofficial contracts ====
The following contracts are also played, but are not recognised by the Skatordnung:

- Revolution: unofficial contract which is like Null, except that the opponents may exchange with the skat
- Bock: unofficial contract in which all game values count double
- Ramsch: unofficial contract where each player plays for himself and the aim is to score the fewest points
- Schieberamsch: like Ramsch, but the skat may be picked up by each player in clockwise order. If a player chooses to pass on the skat, the losers usually score twice as many minus points. After picking up the skat the player returns two cards to the skat, which may be picked up by the next player in turn. The skat is usually 'shoved' once per player, each player may also exchange one or two cards. The shoving of Jacks/Unters after picking up the skat is often forbidden.

=== Game value ===
==== Multipliers ====
The multipliers used to raise the game value (see Skat) are:

- Hand: the skat is not picked up
- Schneider: the soloist or defenders score fewer than 31 points
- Schwarz: the soloist or defenders fail to win any tricks
- Schneider predicted (angesagt): the soloist predicts that his opponents will fail to reach 31 points
- Schwarz predicted: the soloist predicts that he will win every trick
- Ouvert: the soloist lays all his cards on the table before starting (no multiplier changes in Null games)

==== Stakes ====
The game value is doubled with each of the following announcements in succession (cumulative multipliers in brackets):

- Kontra: said if a defender does not think the soloist will win (x2)
- Re: reply by the soloist to "Kontra", if he still thinks he will win (x4)
- Bock: response to "Re" by the defender if he is not convinced that the soloist can win, sometimes also called "Supra" (x8)
- Zippe: soloist's response to "Bock" or "Supra" if, despite the opinion of the defender, he is confident of winning; also called "Hirsch" (x16)

== Cards or card combinations ==
There is a variety of colourful names and nicknames in German for the various cards and card combinations in Skat:

- Der Alte ("the Old Man"): Jack of Clubs / Unter of Acorns
- Bauer ("farmer"): Jack or Unter
- Bilderbuch ("picture-book"): a starting hand comprising just court cards (Kings, Queens and Jacks or Kings, Obers and Unters). A successful solo game is impossible with such a hand.
- blank (1): a singleton, i.e. a single card of one suit in one's hand.
- blank (2): to be void i.e. have no cards of a particular suit in one's hand.
- Fahne ("flag"), Flöte ("flute"), Fackel ("torch") or Latte ("bar" or "batten"): a starting hand with a lot of cards from the same suit, typically 5, 6 or 7.
- Gauß: Jack of Clubs / Unter of Acorns
- Junge ("boy"): Jack or Unter
- Kaffeekränzchen ("coffee party"): a hand with all four Queens or Obers, which are usually of little use in the game
- Leere, Nullen or Luschen: blanks or nixers i.e. the Sevens, Eights and Nines.
- Oma ("Grandma"), Omablatt ("Grandma Hand") or Kutscher ("Coachman"): such a good hand that a soloist can not normally lose and, often, wins it schneider or schwarz.
- Raupenfraß ("caterpillar food"): a very poor hand of cards
- Rollmops ("pickled herring"), Wollkopf ("white head"), Bunter Hund ("coloured dog" i.e. "standing out like a sore thumb") or aus jedem Dorf ein Köter ("a dog/mongrel from every village"): a starting hand of 2 Jacks or Unters and 2 cards of each suit.
- Schneiden ("cut"), schnippeln ("snip") or einen Schnitt machen ("make a cut"), formerly schinden ("flay"): to withhold a high card and thereby capture a higher card from one's opponent. Usually an Ace is held back to capture a Ten. It runs the risk of losing one's own high card.
- Volle(s) ("full one"): Ace and Ten.
- Wenzel: Jack(s)r or Unter(s)

== Regional terms ==
- Schuss: Swabian for "re" (i.e. "double")
- Stoß: "re"
- platt: as in "die Karte hatte ich platt, die musste ich spielen" or "Ich hatte nur eine platte 10": a singleton
- Wenzel Lusche: Saxon nickname for Unter of Bells
- Daus: deuce i.e. ace

== Skat sayings ==
Skat expression	German description	English translation	English explanation
17! or 17½!	Passen beim Eröffnen des Reizens, es reicht eben nicht für 18	"17!" or "17½!"	Said when passing on opening the bidding and the player hasn't even enough for the lowest bid of 18
18 hat man immer!	Beim Eröffnen des Reizens mit 18 Punkten	"We always have 18!"	Said when opening the bidding with 18
59! oder 59½!	Die Gegenspieler sind zwar aus dem Schneider, konnten das Spiel allerdings nicht gewinnen. Die tatsächlich erreichte Augenzahl liegt irgendwo zwischen 31 und tatsächlichen 59.	"59!" or "59½!"	Said by the defenders when they're out of schneider, but unable to win the game, their actual score in card points really lying between 31 and 59.
59 verdrückt und den Alten rausgespielt!	Beim Anspiel des Kreuz-Buben, aber auch bei einem Spiel, das nur schwer oder gar nicht gewonnen werden kann	"59 down and here comes the Old Man!"	Said when playing the Jack of Clubs/Unter of Acorns, but also in a game that can only be won with difficulty or not at all
5 Volle und ein Bilderbuch	Ausdruck für das Gewinnen eines Spiels, da 5 Volle (min 51Pkt) und einige Bilder ausreichen um über 60 Punkte zu kommen.	"5 fat ones and a picture book"	Said of winning a game because 5 "fat ones" (Aces or Tens) (min 51 points) and several picture cards (court cards) are enough to score over 60 card points
Aargh, mein Herz!	unzulässiger Hinweis an den Mitspieler Herz zu spielen oder (zulässige) Ansage eines Herz-Spiels	"Aarrgh! My heart!"	Encouragement to a player to play Hearts or announcement of a Heart game
Aha, sagte die Polizei, jetzt kommt's Gewitter von hinten...	Wenn man vom unerwarteten Spielverlauf überrascht wird	"Aha, said the policeman, now the storm's coming up behind..."	Said when one is surprised by the unexpected direction of the game
Anbieten macht Beet!	Dame oder König wird aufgespielt um den Alleinspieler zu zwingen entweder wenige Punkte zu stechen oder einen Stich der Gegenspieler laufen zu lassen. Beet im Sinne von macht platt.	"Making an offering, levels the ground"	Said when a Queen/Ober or King is played to force the soloist either to take just a few points or let the trick be taken by an opponent.
Aristokratenpack	Wenn man viele Damen und Könige auf der Hand hat	"Aristocratic pack"	Said when you have lots of Kings and Queens in your hand
Asse oder Lasse! Ässer oder Fresser	Mitspieler soll zum Spielen von Assen angehalten werden ("Beim Grand spielt man Asse oder man soll's lasse!" oder auch "Beim Grand spielt man Ässe oder hält die Fresse!")	"Aces or nothing!" "Aces or fodder!"	Said to encourage one's partner to play Aces ("In a Grand play Aces or don't risk it!" or also "In a Grand play Aces or keep quiet!")
Auf'm Tisch gehen sie kaputt! Auf dem Tisch wird verloren! Auf dem Tisch soll'n sie verrecken!	Aufforderung an einen player, der sehr zögerlich aufspielt, sich zu beeilen und eine Karte zu spielen. Mit sie sind sowohl die einzelnen Stiche des Spiels gemeint, die vermeintlich nicht immer rum gehen, als auch die Spiele selbst, da man nicht immer gewinnen kann, in jedem Fall aber spielen muss.	"They all go astray/wrong on the table!" "They're all lost on the table!" "They'll all die on the table!"	Request to a player who is very hesitant to hurry up and play a card. 'They' means both the individual tricks as well as the games; in either case you can’t always win, but still have to play.
Aus/Von jedem Dorf 'n Köter	unzulässiger Hinweis, dass man von allen vier Farben zwei Karten sowie zwei Buben auf der Hand hat	"A dog from every village"	A balanced hand that has two card from every suit as well as two Jacks or Unters (or just a hand with cards from every suit)
Autsch, was pikt denn da!	unzulässiger Hinweis an den Mitspieler Pik zu spielen oder (zulässige) Ansage eines Pik-Spiels	"Ouch, what’s that?" (lit. "Ouch, what stung me?")	Encouragement to play a Spade (Pik) or to announce Spades as trumps
Bei Null gibt es immer Kontra/Contra (Ein) Null gibt immer Kontra	Ein Nullblatt hat immer eine Schwachstelle, sonst würde derjenige eine Nullouvert spielen	"Always double a Null"	Said when Null is announced because such a hand always has a weakness, otherwise Null Ouvert would be announced
Beim Grand spielt man Ässe, sonst hält man die Fresse! Beim Grand spielt man Asse oder man soll's lasse!	Mitspieler soll zum Spielen von Assen angehalten werden	"In a Grand, play Aces or zip it!" "In a Grand, play Aces or forget it!"	Said by opponents when the soloist fails to play Aces in a Grand
Buttern	das Abwerfen einer hohen Fehlfarbe (meistens Asse oder Zehnen) in Hinterhand, wenn der Mitspieler den Stich bereits besitzt oder in Mittelhand, wenn man hofft, dass der Partner den Stich macht.	to fatten, to butter [a trick]	Discarding high suit cards (usually Aces or Tens) in rearhand if your partner already has the trick; or in middlehand if you hope your partner will make the trick.
Da haben wir einen alten Fuchs gefangen	Das sagen die Gegenspieler, wenn sie einen sehr guten Spieler geschlagen haben.	"We've caught an old fox there!"	Said by opponents when they have beaten a very good player.
Da hat sich mal einer auf 'ner Brücke totgemischt. Und dann stellte sich raus, dass er gar nicht dran war In Altenburg... Unter der Brücke... Ist ein Kreisverkehr. In der Mitte steht ein Kreuz: "Er würde heute noch mischen." hat sich schon mal einer totgemischt...	Hinweis darauf, dass der Geber genug gemischt hat und langsam mal abheben lassen sollte	"There was once a man who shuffled himself to death (on a bridge. And then it transpired that it wasn't his turn anyway!)" "In Altenburg ... under the bridge ... is a roundabout. In the middle there is a cross ... otherwise he'd still be shuffling today."	Said when the dealer has shuffled enough and should now let the pack be cut
Da/Der geht er über die Dörfer! Der geht auf die Dörfer	Der Alleinspieler spielt zunächst Fehl, anstatt wie üblich Trumpf zu ziehen.	"There he goes, round the houses!" (lit.: "...round the villages") "He's going round the houses." (lit: "... villages.")	Said when the soloist leads a side suit (typically an Ace) instead of the usual trump
Da kannste mich nachts um halb eins für wecken!	todsicheres Spiel	"Wake me up at half-twelve tonight"	unloseable game
Das genügt, sprach/sagte der Staatsanwalt; Einmal genügt, sagt der Staatsanwalt	Die Gegenpartei hat im laufenden Spiel 60 Augen gestochen, der Solospieler kann nicht mehr gewinnen oder wenn ein Spieler 60 Augen oder mehr zählt.	"That's all/That'll do, said the prosecutor"	The defenders have taken 60 card points in the current game, so the soloist can no longer win. Or when either side scores 60 or more.
Das ist die halbe (Laden)Miete; Das ist der halbe Weg nach Rom	Alleinspieler in Hinterhand sticht Ass und Zehn von Fehl mit Trumpf-Ass oder -Zehn und macht so min. 31 Augen in einem Stich.	"That's half the battle" "That's halfway to Rome"	The soloist in rearhand captures a plain Ace and Ten with a trump Ace or Ten, making at least 31 card points in one trick.
Das ist ein goldenes Ei (eine goldene Uhr).	Beim Aufnehmen des Skats - kann auch Täuschung sein.	"That's a golden egg/gold watch!"	Said on picking up the skat - could be a bluff.
Das ist ja wieder ein Omablatt	Wenn jemand ein so sicheres Blatt hat, dass er die Karten blind ausspielen kann. Meist kommentiert ein Gegenspieler das Blatt des Alleinspielers entsprechend.	"That's a Grandma hand again"	Said when someone has such a safe hand that he could play the cards out blind. Usually said by a defender about the soloist's cards.
Das zieht Blasen!	wenn dem Spieler gute Karten abgestochen werden	"That was blistering!" (lit: "That blistered")	Said when good cards are captured from the soloist
Dem Feinde lang, dem Freunde kurz Lange Farbe kurzer Weg, kurze Farbe langer Weg	häufige Eröffnung des Spieles. Wenn Vorhand nicht der Solospieler ist, spielt er meist eine lange Farbe an, wenn der Solospieler Mittelhand ist. Wenn Mittelhand der Partner ist, wird eine kurze Farbe angespielt.	"Long to foe, short to friend". "Long suit, short way; short suit, long way"	Common opening play. If forehand is not the soloist, he usually plays a long suit when the soloist is middlehand. If middlehand is the partner, a short suit is played.
Dem Freunde kurz, dem Feinde lang – das ist des Spielers Untergang	c.f. Dem Feinde lang, dem Freunde kurz	"Short to friend, long to foe – then the declarer down will go"	ditto
Den kann keiner	den Kreuzbuben überstechen	"Unbeatable!" (lit: "No-one can [beat it]")	When playing the Jack of Clubs/Unter of Acorns because no one can beat it.
Der geht zur Feuerwehr	Wenn man eine Karte in den Skat legt.	"He's going to the fire brigade"	Said when laying a card away to the skat.
Der sitzt im Keller	ist stark am verlieren	"He's in the cellar!"	He's lost badly.
Den spielt meine Großmutter im Schlaf...	todsicheres Spiel	"My grandma could play that in her sleep..."	Said of a fail-safe or surefire hand/game
"Der" wird Soldat … und "der" wird Soldat; Und der kommt zu den Soldaten	Häufiger Kommentar beim Drücken	"He's a soldier ... and he's a soldier." "And he joins the ranks/soldiers."	Common saying when laying away the two cards in the skat
"Der" wird Soldat und "der" zieht in den Krieg; Und der zieht/kommt auf Posten	Die Karte, die in den Skat gelegt wird, bezeichnet man als Soldat. Die Ausspielkarte zieht deswegen in den Krieg, weil sie im Spiel um Augen kämpfen muss, versucht zu stechen oä.	"He's a soldier and he goes to war." "He takes up his post."	The card placed in the skat is called a soldier. The lead card "goes to war" or "takes his post" because it has to fight for points in the game, try to win the trick, etc.
Den nagele ich fest Der kriegt einen vor den Kopf; Den nageln wir jetzt an	Hinterhand sticht unerwartet ab.	"I'm nailing that one down" "That'll put someone's nose out of joint" "Now we'll nail that one"	Said when rearhand (unexpectedly) wins the trick (or just when a player beats)
Den Rest könnt ihr behalten	Alleinspieler hat bereits genug Augen zum gewinnen und schenkt die restlichen Stiche.	"You can have the rest."	The soloist already has enough points to win and gifts the rest of the tricks away
(Der) König zu dritt macht immer ’nen Ritt!	Hinweis darauf, dass man mit einem König (und zwei Luschen gleicher Farbe dazu) bei Farb- oder Grandspielen angeblich immer noch einen Stich machen kann. (König zu dritt macht immer ’n Stich!)	"The King, one of three, always goes on a spree!" (lit: on a ride) "Three cards with a King, are always a win!"	Suggests that one can still win a trick with a King (and two low cards of the same suit) in Suit or Grand games
Der Maurer mischt den Mörtel an	Kommentar des verlierenden Alleinspielers, wenn der "Maurer" einen Stich nimmt oder Trumpf zieht.	"The bricklayer mixes the mortar up"	Comment by a losing soloist when the bricklayer (q.v.) takes a trick or plays a trump
Der Sack ist zu	Der Spieler, der überzeugt ist, gewonnen zu haben.	"The sack is sealed"	Said by a player who is convinced he or she has won
Der schämt sich	eine blanke 10 wird verdeckt auf das ausgespielte Ass des Alleinspielers geworfen.	"He's ashamed [of himself]"	Said when a singleton Ten has to be played on an opponent's led Ace
Der Skat brummt mal wieder Der Skat brüllt Die hatte ich auch bitter nötig	Kommentar beim Aufnehmen des Skat.	"The skat's buzzing again" "The skat's calling." "I'm in dire need of that too."	Said when picking up the skat
Die Augen sterben auf dem Tisch! Die Karten sterben auf dem Tisch	Aufforderung zum riskanten Anspiel von Augen oder Ausruf bei einem solchen Anspiel.	"The big ones die on the table!"	Invitation to risk playing high point value cards or said when such are played (eyes = card points)
Die Kleinen jagen die Großen; Die Kleinen fangen die Großen; Die Kleinen holen/ziehen die Großen	wenn der Spieler zuerst kleine Trümpfe ausspielt	"The little ones hunt the big ones" "The little ones catch the big ones"	Said when the soloist initially leads low trumps (in the hope of voiding the defenders of trumps) (and pulls out higher trumps)
Die Sieben und die Achte war alles, was er brachte. Der Alte brachte - die Sieben und die Achte.	Wenn die Gegenseite einen ausgespielten Alten (Kreuzbube) mit zwei Luschen bedient.	"The Sevens and Eights are all he predates" "The Old Man hates - the Sevens and Eights" (lit.: "The Old Man needs..."	Said when the defenders throw two non-counters on the Old Man (Jack of Clubs/Unter of Acorns) led by the soloist
Dieser Hühnerhund von Karo! Karo, dieser Hühnerhund, ist noch immer kerngesund...	unzulässiger Hinweis an den Mitspieler Karo zu spielen oder (zulässige) Ansage eines Karo-Spiels oder Karospiel	"That gundog of Karo's!" "Diamond the gundog is always fit as a fiddle"	Encouragement to a player to play Diamonds (Karo) or said when announcing Diamonds as trumps
Ehrlich geteilt	der Spieler hat nur 60 Augen	"Honourably divided", "An honourable draw"	Said when the game is 60-60; in which case the soloist loses.
Ein Herz hat ein jeder!	beim Ausspiel von Herz	"Everyone has a heart!"	On playing a Heart.
Ein Kreuz hat jeder	Kreuzspiel	"Everyone has a cross"	Announcement of a Club contract (play on words, Kreuz can also mean "cross".
Eine lange Fahne haben	Viele Karten einer Farbe.	"Have a pennant" (lit.: "... long flag")	to have lots of cards of one suit
Elf Trümpfe sind im Spiel, sie mitzuzählen sei dein Ziel	Wichtig ist, dass jeder Spieler sich merkt, welche Karten bereits gespielt sind...	"Eleven trump are in the game, counting them should be your aim"	It is important that every player notes which cards have been played, especially the trumps.
Endlich mal ein warmer Regen; Endlich wird die Wiese grün	wenn man gute Karten bekommt oder wenn der Alleinspieler einen guten Skat aufnimmt	"At last, warm rain" "At last the grass is green."	Said when one receives good cards or when the soloist picks up a good skat
Es macht dem Spieler kein Vergnügen, wenn beide Teile sechzig kriegen	wenn der Spieler nur 60 Augen hat	"It gives the soloist no pleasure, when both sides score sixty"	Said when the score is 60-60 (and the soloist thus loses)
Friedensangebot	Alleinspieler spielt eine niedrige Karte an und schenkt den Gegnern den Stich.	"Peace offering"	Soloist plays a low card and gives the trick to the defenders
Gekreuzigt, gestorben und begraben	Eine oder mehrere Kreuz-Karten haben dem Spiel den Garaus gemacht.	"Crucified, died and buried"	One or more Clubs have ended the game.
Gelegt ist gelegt!	Spieler legt versehentlich eine falsche Karte der gleichen Farbe	"What's played is played!"	Player accidentally plays the wrong card of the right suit
Gewehre ins Rathaus; Alle Gewehre auf's Rathaus	Die restlichen Karten des Spielers sind hoch, weshalb er aufdeckt.	"Rifles to the town hall!" "All rifles to the town hall!"	Said when the declarer claims the remaining tricks without playing them and all his cards have to be laid on the table
Grand Hand nimmt man geschlossen auf!	Häufiger Spruch, wenn man seine Spielkarten erst aufnimmt nachdem sie vollständig vom Geber ausgeteilt worden sind.	"You only pick up a Grand Hand in one go"	Commonly said when you only pick up your playing cards once they have all been dealt.
Grün (,das) scheißen/machen die Gänse (im Mai)!	Grün wird vom Alleinspieler zur Trumpffarbe erklärt oder beim Ausspielen von Grün.	"Green is goose poo in May!"	Leaves (Grün) is announced by the soloist or on leading with Leaves
Hand hat allerhand Hand hat alles	Spielt der Alleinspieler Hand, ist die Wahrscheinlichkeit größer, dass er in einer Farbe nicht blank ist	"Hand is a mishmash" [of every suit]	If the soloist plays a Hand, the chances are higher that he is not void in one suit
Hast du Ass und 10 gesehen, sollst du von der Farbe gehen!	Wenn von einer Farbe Ass und Zehn gespielt worden sind, ist es meist nicht günstig für die Gegenpartei des Alleinspielers, diese Farbe weiterhin anzuspielen	"If the Ace and Ten are out, playing that suit will bring you nowt"	If the Ace and Ten of a side suit have been played, it is usually not fruitful for the defenders to lead this suit again
Hast du Ass und 10 zu Haus', spiel 'ne and're Farbe aus		If you have the Ace and Ten, play another side suit then"	If you have Ace and Ten it often pays to hold them back
Hausfrauenmischung	Wenn man ständig Karten auf die Hand bekommt mit denen man weder „Spielen“ noch „Umdrehen“ kann	"Housewife shuffling"	Said when you keep getting cards with which you can play neither positive nor negative games
Herz Ass in Liebe und Spiel!	Die Vorhand spielt zu Beginn gleich Herz-Ass	"Ace of Hearts in love and play!"	Forehand opens with the Ace of Hearts
Herz ist Trumpf! Herz ist doch immer Trumpf!	Herz wird vom Alleinspieler zur Trumpffarbe erklärt	"Hearts are trumps! Hearts are always trumps!"	Soloist announces Hearts as trumps
Herz mit Stiel or Neublau	Pik	"Hearts with stalks" or "New Blue"	Spades
Herzlich lacht die Tante … wenn se gut gefrühstückt hat	Ansage eines Herz-Spiels	"Heartily laughs the aunt... when she's had a good breakfast"	Announcement of a Heart game
Herzen mit Schmerzen	Ansage eines Herzspiels	"Heartache" (lit.: "Hearts with pains")	Announcement of a Heart game
Hineingewichst und nicht gezittert	Beim Schmieren	"no time to be afraid", "thrown in without fear"	When smearing
Hinten werden die Enten fett	Die letzten Stiche bringen die meisten Punkte	"At the back the ducks are fat"	The last tricks bring in the most points
Hosen runter!	(1) wenn der Alleinspieler seine Gegner zwingt, Trumpf zu bedienen (2) Aufforderung, bei einem Ouvert-Spiel vor Spielbeginn alle 10 Karten offen auf den Tisch zu legen	"Trousers down!"	(1) Said if the soloist forces his opponents to follow suit in trumps, or (2) challenge, when Ouvert is announced, for all 10 cards to be laid face up on the table
Ich hab's im Kreuz!	unzulässiger Hinweis an den Mitspieler Kreuz zu spielen oder (zulässige) Ansage eines Kreuz-Spiels	"I've got back trouble"	Encouragement to a player to play Clubs or announcement of Clubs as trumps (Kreuz can refer to the back or Clubs)
Ich spiel die 18!	wenn nur einer der player beim Reizen 18 gesagt hat (was etwa bei Preisskat häufig vorkommt), so drückt er hiermit aus, dass er nicht von der Möglichkeit Gebrauch macht, ein höherwertiges Spiel zu spielen, sondern dass er tatsächlich nur Karo-Einfach spielt.	"I'll play the 18"	If only one player said 18 when bidding (which is often the case with competition Skat, for example), he is expressing that he is not making use of the opportunity to play a higher-quality game, but that he is actually only playing a simple Diamond contract.
Jungs!	Ansage eines Grand-Spiels.	"Boys!" "Lads!"	Announcement of a Grand
Karo heißt der Hühnerhund	Ansage eines Karo-Spiels	"The gundog's called Karo"	Announcement that Diamonds (Karo) are trumps
(Eine) Karte oder (ein) Stück Holz	Aufforderung an einen Spieler, der zu zögerlich aufspielt, sich zu beeilen und eine Karte zu spielen.	"A card or a stick of wood"	Request to a player who is too hesitant to hurry up and play a card.
Kein Bein kriegst du auf die Erde	wenn die Gegenspieler glauben, daß der Alleinspieler verliert	"You don't need a leg when you're on the ground"	Said when the defenders think the soloist will lose
Klein Vieh/Kleinvieh macht auch Mist	Viele Stiche mit jeweils wenigen Augen bekommen.	"Small animals also poo"	Said when a low value card captures a high value one or when many low-value tricks are taken
Langer Weg, kurze Farbe! Lange Farbe, kurzer Weg; kurzer Farbe, lange Weg	c.f. Dem Feinde lang, dem Freunde kurz	"Long way, short suit"	see Dem Feinde lang, dem Freunde kurz
Mach es billig und spiel Karo!	Bemerkung der Gegenspieler beim Erkennen, dass ein Spiel schwer bis gar nicht gewonnen werden kann. (Bsp.: überreizt)	"Make it cheap and play Diamonds"	Remark by a defender on realising that a game can only be won with difficulty or even not at all (has been overbid)
Mal wieder Leipziger Allerlei	c.f. Aus jedem Dorf 'n Köter	"Mixed veg again"	see Aus jedem Dorf 'n Köter. Leipziger Allerlei is a mixed vegetable dish from Leipzig
Mauern	das absichtliche Nichtspielen trotz guter Karten um einen Mitspieler ins Alleinspiel zu zwingen, welches dieser vermutlich verliert.	bricklaying, stonewalling	Intentionally not playing good cards in order to force one’s partner into playing the game alone, which he or she will probably lose
Millimeterarbeit; 61 ist genauso gut wie 89	Der Alleinspieler gewinnt mit 61 Augen.	"Precision work" "61 is as good as 89"	Said when the soloist wins with 61 points
Null aufs Pferd	Ansage von Null ouvert	"Nothing (Null) on the horse"	Announcement of Null Ouvert
Omaspiel, Oma-Spiel	Ein unverlierbares Spiel	Grandma game	An unloseable game
Oma und Opa verliefen sich im Wald…	Reaktion der Gegenseite auf ein (vermeintliches) Omablatt des Alleinspielers, wenn dieser nicht hinlegt.	"Grandma and Grandpa got lost in the forest"	Reaction of the other side to a (presumed) Grandma hand of the declarer, if he does not pick up the skat.
Piesch bringt den Siesch!	wenn eine Pik-Karte das Spiel entscheidet	"Pique (Spades) for a winning streak"	Said when a Spade decides the game
(Also,) Pikus der Waldspecht!	Ansage eines Pik-Spiels	"(So,) Picus the woodpecker!"	Announcement that Spades are trumps (Picus is the Latin name for the woodpecker family)
Ramsch oder Klatsche!	Ansage zweier nicht am Reizspiel teilgenommener player, um den dritten player zu einem Ramsch-Spiel provozieren zu können.	"Ramsch or thrashing!"	Said by the two players who did not participate in the auction in order to provoke the third player to play a Ramsch.
Raus und Gewonnen	Der Alleinspieler gewinnt die Runde und Gegenpartei ist aus dem Schneider.	"Out and won"	The soloist wins the deal and the defenders are schneider.
Rest bei mir! Der Rest geht an mich!	Ausdruck des Alleinspielers, dass alle weiteren Stiche an ihn gehen werden; er legt dann seine restlichen Karten auf den Tisch, so dass die Gegenspieler die Behauptung überprüfen können.	"The rest are mine!"	Said by declarer if he's sure of winning all further tricks; he then lays his remaining cards on the table so that the claim can be verified.
Schellümpchen	Ansage eines Schellen (Karo)-Spieles in der Gegend, wo mit deutschem Blatt gespielt wird	Bellboy, Bellringer (lit. "Rascal of Bells")	Announcement of Bells (Diamonds) in region where the game is played with German-suited cards
Schneider schwarz! Schneider ist doch immer schwarz!	Provokante Aussage des Gegenspielers bei einem gewonnenen Spiel des Alleinspielers, welcher das Spiel mit allen Stichen beendet hat.	"Schneider schwarz! Schneider is always black!"	Provocative statement by opponent in a game won by the declarer who finished with all the tricks.
Schneider sind auch Leute!	beim Schneiderspiel des Gegners	"Tailors are people too!"	Said by declarer on winning schneider. Play on Schneider which means tailor.
Schreibt heim um Geld!	wenn man ein gutes Blatt hat zur Einschüchterung der Gegner	"Write home for money!"	Said to intimidate your opponents when you have a good hand.
Schwarz ist die Nacht!	wenn die Gegenspieler Schwarz sind	"Black is the night!"	Said when the defenders are schwarz (=black) i.e. have lost every trick (or when anyone wins all tricks)
Schwarz wie die Nacht!	wenn einer schwarz gespielt wird	"Black as the night!"	Said when the soloist wins schwarz (=black) i.e. takes every trick
Sicher wie die Bank aus England	Ein unverlierbares Spiel zu haben	"Safe as the Bank of England"	To have an unloseable game
Sieben, Neun, Bauer Steht wie 'ne Mauer; 7, 8, Bauer... steht wie ne Mauer; Sieben, Neun(er), Unter -(geht) keiner/nichts drunter	Bei Null ist eine Farbe mit 7, 9 und Bube absolut dicht (dies ist allerdings nur dann korrekt, wenn man nicht die Kombination: 7, 9, Bube und Ass in einer Farbe hat und die Farbe nicht selbst ausspielen muss). Gilt auch für 7, 8, Bube.	"7, 9, Jack resists all attack" (lit.: "...stands like a wall") "7, 9, Unter's no reason to chunter" (lit.: "with 7, 9, Unter, you cannot go under")	In a Null game, a suit with 7, 9 and Jack is absolutely solid (only true, however, if you do not have the 7, 9, Jack and Ace in one suit and you do not have to lead the suit yourself).
Sieben, Acht, Dame, flattert wie 'ne Fahne; Acht, Neun, Zehn kann auch noch geh'n	bei Null nicht absolut dicht.	"7, 8, Queen, flutters like a flag" "8, 9, 10 may also work then"	Suggestion that these are not watertight combinations in a Null game
So spielt man mit Studenten!	wenn die Gegenpartei "vorgeführt" wird. Wenn ein Spieler wegen des schlechten Gegenspieles der MS diese an die Wand spielt.	"That's how you play with students!"	Said if the opponents take a lot of punishment; when a player goes to the wall as a result of poor play by his co-defender.
Spiel Ass, sonst wirst du nass!	Regel Grand-Eröffnung	"Play an Ace or face disgrace (lit.: "...or you’ll get wet!"	Standard opening play in Grand
Spielst du mir die Zehn nicht blank, sag ich dir hinterher schön' dank Blanke Zehn - auf Wiedersehen!		"Don't play a singleton Ten to me, or I'll very thankful be" "Singleton Ten, goodbye!"	Playing a singleton Ten risks the opponent capturing it with the Ace for a very fat trick
Trumpf ist die Seele vom Spiel; Trumpf ist die Seele vom Klavier	beim Trumpfanspiel	"Trumps are the soul of the game" "Trumps are the heart of the piano"	On leading a trump or when you lose a game because you are not able to play any more trumps
umgebogen	Als wird ein Spiel bezeichnet, das der Alleinspieler verloren hat.	turned around	Said of a game lost by the soloist
Unentschieden	Ein Spiel was gerade mit 60 verloren wurde	"Draw"	A game lost with 60 points
Verlasse dich nie auf den Skat, denn meist bis du dann verlassen	Besonders Anfänger aus Neugierde - der Skat wird schon helfen - den geringsten Reizwert (18) sagen, um dann enttäuscht das Spiel zu verlieren.	"Never pin your hopes on the skat, you see; for you'll usually disappointed be"	Out of enthusiasm that the skat will help them, beginners often announce the lowest bid (18), only to be disappointed when they lose the game
Von hinten stechen die Bienen! Bienchen sticht von hinten.	sagt Hinterhand, wenn er (meist wider Erwarten) durch Übertrumpfen einen hohen Stich macht oder Ausspruch, das am besten in Hinterhand gestochen wird, da ein Überstechen dann nicht mehr möglich is	"Bees sting from behind!"	Said by rearhand when overtrumping to take a fat trick, usually against expectations, or just that it's easiest to win in rearhand because you can't be beaten subsequently
vorführen	das Anspielen immer derselben Fehlfarbe, die der Alleinspieler in Mittelhand nicht besitzt und entweder stechen oder abwerfen kann, was entweder zu Trumpfarmut oder zum Buttern führt.	to parade [a side suit]	repeatedly leading the same side suit which the soloist in middlehand doesn’t have and can either trump or discard, leading to a lack of trumps or to smearing
Vor der Schüssel in die Hose; Kurz vor dem Lokus/Klo in die Hose (gegangen)	Wenn der Alleinspieler mit dem letzten Stich noch verliert.	to pee yourself just in front of the bowl to wet yourself just before the loo.	Said when the soloist (or the defenders?) just loses on the last trick
Wasch dir mal die Hände	sagt man, wenn man mit den erhaltenen Karten nicht zufrieden ist	"Go wash your hands!"	Said when a player is not pleased with his or her cards
Wat einmal geht, geht zweimal!	wenn man zweimal hintereinander mit derselben Farbe aufkommt.	"What goes once, goes twice!"	Said when one leads the same suit twice in succession
Wer nicht weiß wo, spielt Karo!	Ansage eines Karo-Spiels	"If you don’t know, play Karo" (=Diamonds)	Announcement of Diamonds as trumps
Wenzel-Treffen auf der Wartburg	Ein Spieler hat alle vier Unter auf der Hand	"Boys on the watchtower"	Said if a player has all four Unters in his hand
Wie heißt das faule Ding?	wenn der Spieler mit der Spielansage zu lange zögert	"What's the wretched thing called?"	Said when the soloist takes too long over the announcement
Wie heißt das hübsche Kind?	Frage nach dem Spiel	"What's the name of the sweet child?" (lit: "what's the lovely child called?")	What's the contract? What are you playing? (to the declarer)
Wie stehen die Aktien?	Wenn man die Abrechnung sehen will	"What's the share price?" (lit: "How's the stock (as in stocks and shares) standing?")	Said when a player wants to see the scoresheet

== See also ==
- Glossary of card game terms
- Skat scoring
