= Preisskat =

Skat tournaments are known as Preisskats and are very common in Germany where Skat is mainly played. They are usually organised by Skat clubs or other local clubs.

== Rules ==
All participants pay an entry fee which is used to fund prizes awarded at the end of the event. The competitions are played in accordance with Skat rules that are laid down in advance. A Preisskat should be played according to the International Skat Rules so that rules do not vary everywhere. These rules are those agreed jointly by the two biggest skat organisations, the German Skat Association (DSkV) and the International Skat Players Association (ISPA).

At a Preisskat, the seating plan is either worked out in advance or determined by drawing lots or based on the points scored (from the second round onwards).

In a solo game, the soloist has to pay a so-called Abreizgeld (disincentive fee) of about 0.50 € if he loses in addition to the entry fee. After losing more than a certain number of games (usually after the fourth) each game lost costs a higher amount (about 1.- €). 'Passed' games may also be charged a penalty fee. The Abreizgeld usually goes into the cash box of the tournament organizer and is not redistributed again in the form of prizes. The winner of a tournament is the player who has scored the most points. In addition, there are often additional prizes for the best players in the women's, youth and senior categories.

In addition to the mandatory individual competition, there may be other classifications within the scope of a Preisskat for which a separate entry fee is charged. As a rule, participation is optional and has no influence on the individual competition. The most common variants are team scoring (usually four players) and tandem or mixed scoring (two players).

Preisskat is generally not classed as a gambling game within the meaning of section 284 of the relevant German law (StGB) and may therefore be played for money. This stems from the fact that Preisskat is a tournament game that has been taking place long enough to exclude categorisation as a game of chance.

== See also ==
- Skat scoring
