= British Skat Association =

Card game organisation

The British Skat Association (BSA) was founded in 2001 to "promote the playing of Skat in Britain." Skat is Germany's national card game, but is played internationally under the auspices of the International Skat Players Association and has been described as one of the best and most interesting card games for three players, and "the king of German card games."

== Organisation ==
The BSA was launched in 2001 at a Skat tournament held in Oxford and organised by David Parlett, John McLeod and Nick Wedd. The BSA holds several tournaments each year and plans eventually to affiliate to the International Skat Players Association and participate internationally. There are several forms of Skat played in different countries; the BSA plays the standard German game and the website offers an English version of the rules translated by Parlett.

Present office holders of the BSA are:

- President: David Parlett
- Secretary: John McLeod
- Treasurer: Nick Wedd

== See also ==
- History of Skat
- German Skat Association
