= German Doppelkopf Association =

German card game organisation

The German Doppelkopf Association (German: Deutsche Doppelkopf-Verband or DDV) was founded in 1982 and forms the umbrella organisation for Doppelkopf clubs in Germany.

== History ==
Doppelkopf is the most popular four-player card game in the north and west of Germany. Its rules were first recorded in 1811, but the modern game emerged towards the end of the 19th century. Originating in Saxony, it established itself in the north of Germany before spreading south and west as a result of its popularity among soldiers during both world wars.

The German Doppelkopf Association was founded on 27 March 1982 in Brunswick on the occasion of the first German individual championship. On that day 16 clubs joined the Association of which 7 are still members: the 1st DDC Brunswick, Janus Darmstadt, 1st DC Freiburg, DC Hanover, DC Fullewasser Kassel, 1st Offenbach DV 81 and DC Keine Neun Wiesbaden. Individual membership has risen steadily since from just under 400 in 1982 to almost 1,000 today. Over the same time, the number of clubs has risen from 16 to 69.

The Association is a not-for-profit registered organisation and the "pillar of Doppelkopf culture in Germany".

== Role ==
As well as acting as the umbrella organisation for clubs, the German Doppelkopf Association lays down the official rules and runs nationwide competitions. It also aims to promote the establishment of new clubs.

== See also ==
- German Skat Association

== Bibliography ==
- Hammer, Paul (1811). Die deutschen Kartenspiele oder Anleitung die üblichen gesellschaftlichen Spiele mit der deutschen Karte als Solo, Kontra, Schafkopf....zu lernen. Leipzig.
- Walther, Erich (1899). Das Schafkopfspiel: Schafkopf, Wendisch und Doppelkopf. Leipzig.
