= International Skat Court =

Sports tribunal

The International Skat Court is the highest decision-making body in the sport of Skat. It oversees the observance of the International Skat Order (regulations for the game of Skat), the refereeing regulations and the rules for referees in Skat. The International Skat Court was founded on 1 December 2001 by a merger of the German Skat Court ( Deutsches Skatgericht), founded in Altenburg in 1927, with the Rules Commission of the International Skat Players Association. (ISPA). It took over on 1 January 2002 and its seat is in the Hotel am Roßplan in the centre of Altenburg.

Until 1978 the German Skat Court had a three-member panel; from 1978 to 1990 it had five members and from the Reunification of Germany in 1990, seven members. From 1963 to 1990, East Germany had the Altenburg Skat Court. Today the International Skat Court has nine members of which seven are chosen from the German Skat Congress and two by ISPA. The president of the court from 2002 until 2014 was Peter Luczak. His successor is Hans Braun.

In cases of dispute over the rules of Skat the participants may appeal to the Skat Court who, after hearing the case, make a binding decision.
