= European Skat Championship =

Tournament for the card game Skat

The European Skat Championship has been held biennially since 1979 by the world Skat organisation, the International Skat Players Association (ISPA), at various locations. It alternates with the World Skat Championship which has also been run biennially since 1978 by the same association. In addition to the title of European Skat Champion there are awards for a European Women's Champion, a European Youth Champion, a European Veteran's Champion and a European Women Veteran's Champion.

In the 2009 European Skat Championship in Graz, Claudia Knape won the final against the men and became the European Skat Champion. The women’s title was awarded to Martina Schmidt, who had won it by being better placed against Knape (M. Schmidt 9th, C. Knape 16th) in the preliminary rounds.

In addition, since 1981 there has been an award for the best team and the best mixed team. From 1995 there has been an award for best nation.

== Championships and winners ==
| | Venue | Men | Country | Women | Country | Team | Country | National Prize |
|---|---|---|---|---|---|---|---|---|
| 2023 | Magdeburg Germany | | | | | | | |
| 2021 | Not held (COVID) | | | | | | | |
| 2019 | Costa Pacifica Europe | Ingolf Münch | GER | Anissa Feiler | GER | Canadian Connection | GER | Germany |
| 2017 | Wisła Poland | Deni Lazicic | GER | Marianne Müller | GER | Dream Team Ost & Boki | GER | Germany |
| 2015 | Koblenz Germany | Senad Seferovic | GER | Claudia Knape | GER | Babeda | GER | Germany |
| 2013 | St. Vith Belgium | Robert Straubinger | GER | Birgit Güttes | GER | Karo Ass Meerbusch | GER | Germany |
| 2011 | Sélestat France | Senad Seferovic | GER | Tamara Wettlaufer | GER | Loibi | GER | Germany |
| 2009 | Graz Austria | Claudia Knape | GER | Martina Schmidt | GER | Minicar Pforzheim | GER | Austria |
| 2007 | Kirchheim Germany | Detlef Plewnia | GER | Claudia Knape | GER | Das Dream Team | GER | Germany |
| 2005 | Wisła Poland | Detlef Plewnia | GER | Martina Schmidt | GER | Die Koblenzer | GER | Germany |
| 2003 | Seefeld Austria | Thomas Wenning | GER | Claudia Knape | GER | Avantgarde | GER | Germany |
| 2001 | Balatonfüred Hungary | Gerd Raschke | GER | Ingeborg Zeitz | GER | Jupiter Team | GER | Germany |
| 1999 | Colmar France | Gerd Raschke | GER | Sigrid Haas | GER | Weser Haie Bremen | GER | Germany |
| 1997 | Ostend Belgium | Gerd Roth | GER | Martha Simons | GER | Hagen International | GER | Belgium |
| 1995 | Schladming Austria | RoCountry Bünten | GER | Regina Schobert | GER | Hendikepp Bremen | GER | Austria |
| 1993 | Grächen Switzerland | Jürgen Behnke | GER | Helga Goes | GER | Mittelrhein Koblenz | GER | – |
| 1991 | Torremolinos Spain | Dieter Honsel | GER | Ellen Schüler | GER | Skatfreunde Hamm | GER | – |
| 1989 | Friedrichshafen Germany | Günter Kotschner | GER | Uschi Bayer | GER | Jasen Team | GER | – |
| 1987 | Ostend Belgium | Helmut Hill | GER | Erika Ulomska | GER | Herz Dame Aachen | GER | – |
| 1985 | Linz Austria | Detlef Plewnia | GER | Irmgard Ahr-Holländer | GER | Blieskastel Homburg | GER | – |
| 1983 | Paris France | Dieter Schlüter | GER | Sigrun Clauder | GER | Dortmunder Skat Asse | GER | – |
| 1981 | Trier Germany | Philipp Wagner | GER | Marianne Brammertz | GER | Ingoltown | GER | – |
| 1979 | Strasbourg France | Gerhard Witt | GER | Marianne Feuerstein | GER | – | GER | – |
