= World Skat Championship =

Tournament for the card game Skat

The World Skat Championship has been organised biannually since 1978 by the International Skat Players Association (ISPA) at various locations worldwide and is the highest level Skat competition in the world. It alternates with the European Skat Championship which has taken place biannually since 1979 and which ISPA also organises. In addition to the title of World Skat Champion, players compete for other titles: the Women's World Skat Champion, a Youth World Champion, a Veteran World Champion and a Veteran Women's World Champion.

In addition, there is an award for the best team (since 1980) and the best mixed team.

In 1992 an award for the best nation was introduced.

== Past championships and winners ==
Year	Men	Women	Team	Best Nation	Held in
1978	(Germany) Helmut Voss	(Germany) Marianne Kaseckert	—N/a	—N/a	(United States) Anaheim
1980	(Germany) Willi Knack	(Germany) Gerti Lacher	(Germany) Herz Bube Aachen	—N/a	(Australia) Sydney
1982	(Germany) Dieter Honsel	(Germany) Gerti Lacher	(Germany) Böse Buben Untermain	—N/a	(Canada) Kitchener
1984	(Germany) Ludger Brinkschulte	(Germany) Irene Raatz	(Germany) Herthie Hamm	—N/a	(Germany) Dortmund
1986	(Germany) Manfred Grothe	(Germany) Angelika Krüger	(Germany) Ritzendorf Dortmund	—N/a	(South Africa) Johannesburg
1988	(Germany) Reinhold Wynands	(Germany) Margit Braun	(Germany) Herz Dame Aachen	—N/a	(Switzerland) Grächen
1990	(Germany) Peter Pekarek	(Germany) Hanni Gnadl	(Germany) Skatfreunde Hamm	—N/a	(Australia) Surfers Paradise
1992	(Germany) Detlef Plewnia	(Germany) Ellen Schüler	(Germany) Mittelrhein Koblenz	Germany	(Canada) Montreal
1994	(Germany) Dietmar Fritz	(Germany) Martha Prickartz	(Germany) Jogi Team Baesweiler	Germany	(Germany) Munich
1996	(Germany) Gerd Raschke	(Germany) Beate Lochschmid	(Germany) Hagen International	Germany	(United States) Clearwater
1998	(Germany) Walter Schneider	(Germany) Alexandra Degener	(Germany) Hagen International	Germany	(Namibia) Windhoek
2000	(Germany) Wolfgang Skusa	(Germany) Claudia Then	(Germany) Merkur Spielothek	Germany	(Spain) Magaluf
2002	(Germany) Andreas Backhaus	(Germany) Angelika Pullig	(Germany) Skatfreunde Hamm	Belgium	(Germany) Grömitz
2004	(Germany) Dirk Paßmann	(Germany) Angelika Pullig	(Germany) TMG Reiseteam	Germany	(Chile) Pucón
2006	(Germany) Bernd Uhl	(Germany) Angelika Pullig	(Germany) Hagen International	Canada	(The Bahamas) Nassau
2008	(Poland) Adam Kołodziejczyk	(Germany) Angelika Pullig	(Germany) DEUMA Team	Canada	(Spain) Calpe
2010	(Germany) Alfred Flöck	(Germany) Claudia Then	(Germany) Hagen International	Germany	(South Africa) Cape Town
2012	(Germany) Andreas Backhaus	(Germany) Carmen Schulze	(Germany) Loibi	Germany	(Poland) Karpacz
2014	(Germany) Hans-Jürgen Neubert	(Germany) Ina Hoffman	(Germany) Hagen International	Germany	(Paraguay) Asunción
2016	(Belgium) Rolf Schnier	(Germany) Tina Halke	(Germany) 1. SC Dieburg	Canada	(United States) Las Vegas
2018	(Germany) Maik Neumann	(Germany) Carmen Schulze	(Germany) BABEDA	Netherlands	(Germany) Berlin
2020	Not held due to COVID-19 pandemic				
2022	(Germany) Deni Lazicic	(Germany) Angelika Pullig	ISPAWORLD and Friends	(International team) Team International	(Canada) Edmonton
2024	Frank Dreyer			Germany	At sea (Costa Diadema)
