= International Skat Players Association =

Competitive sporting organization

The International Skat Players Association (ISPA) is the worldwide umbrella organisation for all competition players of the card game Skat. The ISPA was founded in 1976 by Peter Brand and Martha Prickartz in Aachen, Germany.

It initially crossed swords with the world's largest national Skat association, the German Skat Association (Deutscher Skatverband, DSkV), and promulgated different rules for the game. Towards the end of the 1990s, talks between the top officials of each organisation led to rapprochement and agreement between the two large associations. The ban on double membership was lifted and a uniform International Skat Order (Internationale Skatordnung , ISkO) was adopted, which has been valid worldwide ever since. The ISPA delegates two regular commissioners to the International Skat Court (Internationale Skatgericht).

ISPA World is divided into national branches with regional groups and further subdivisions down to local clubs. It operates its own leagues as well as cup and championship competitions. Its focus is on the open World and European Skat Championships, which have been held annually since 1978/1979 at various venues. In addition, ISPA has organized the Online Skat World Championships biennially since 2011. Furthermore, ISPA publishes the annual magazine, Skatmagazin.

The subdivision of ISPA Germany (ISPA-Deutschland) has relatively few members in comparison with the DSkV and is inter alia jointly responsible for organising the annual German Skat Championship. This results in double events, because the DSkV also organises German championships with individual and team competitions and runs federal and regional Skat leagues.

== See also ==
- British Skat Association
