= List of trick-taking games =

Games in the Trick Taking card genre

The trick-taking genre of card games is one of the most common varieties, found in every part of the world. The following is a list of trick-taking games by type of pack:

== 52-card French-suited pack ==
- 304
- 3-2-5
- 3-5-8
- 400
- 500
- 9-5
- Agram
- All fours
- Apples
- Auction bridge
- Baloot
- Barbu
- Bauernschnapsen
- Bashi Fen
- Belote
- Bid Whist
- Black Lady
- Bluke
- Bisca
- Bohemian Schneider
- Boon
- Boston
- Bourré
- Callbreak
- Cego
- Clabber
- Clag
- Contract bridge
- Court piece
- Cucumber
- Doppelkopf
- Elementeo
- Euchre
- Euchre variants
- Femkort
- Forty-fives
- French tarot
- Fünfzehnern
- German Schafkopf
- German Solo
- Gong Zhu
- Hearts
- Hokm
- Huckleybuck
- Jabberwocky
- Jass
- Judgement
- Julepe
- Kachufool
- Kaiser
- Klaberjass
- Klaverjas
- Kontraspiel
- Köpknack
- Lanterloo
- Mǎ diào
- Make-A-Million
- Manille
- Mariage
- Marias
- Marjapussi
- Marjolet
- Mus
- Napoleon
- Ninety-nine
- Norseman's knock
- Officers' Skat
- Oh hell
- Oma Skat
- Ombre
- Pedro
- Phat
- Pinochle (uses a 48-card pack)
- Pitch
- Put
- Rage
- Rams
- Renfield
- Réunion
- Ristikontra
- Rödskägg
- Rook
- Ruff and Honours
- Shelem
- Sheng ji
- Sixty-three
- Smear
- Spades
- Sueca
- Tarabish
- Tarneeb
- Tarocchini
- Thunee
- Trex
- Trump
- Turkish King
- Twenty-eight
- Twenty-five
- Vira
- Whist
- Zole

== 32- or 36-card French-suited packs ==
- Belote
- Bête
- Bezique
- Coinche
- Écarté
- Jeu Royal de la Guerre
- Piquet
- Preferans
- Préférence
- Sheepshead
- Skat
- Tapp

== German-suited packs ==
The following games are played with German-suited packs of 32, 33 or 36 cards. Some are played with shortened packs e.g. Schnapsen. German-suited packs are common, not just in Germany, but in Austria and Eastern Europe.

- Bauerntarock
- Bieten
- Binokel
- Gaigel
- Kaiserspiel
- Karnöffel
- Perlaggen
- Schafkopf (Bavarian)
- Schnapsen
- Sixty-six
- Skat
- Ulti
- Watten

== Italian-suited cards ==
- Tressette
- Briscola
- Calabresella

== Spanish-suited cards ==
The following games are played with 40- or 48-card Spanish-suited packs.

- Aluette
- Botifarra
- Envite canario
- Truc
- Truco
- Tute

== Tarock pack ==
Tarot card games are played with a Tarock pack, usually of 54 or 78 cards comprising four French suits and a special trump suit of Tarots or Tarocks. The following games are played with such packs:

- Cego
- Danish Tarok
- French tarot
- Grosstarock
- Hungarian Tarock
- Husarln
- Illustrated Tarock
- Königrufen
- Kosakeln
- Minchiate
- Neunzehnerrufen
- Point Tarock
- Scarto
- Strohmandeln
- Tapp Tarock
- Taroc l'Hombre
- Tarocchini
- Troccas
- Troggu
- Zwanzigerrufen

== Dedicated deck ==
The following games use a dedicated deck of cards to play.

- Arcs (board game)
- Boon
- Bottle Imp
- Cat in the Box
- Papayoo
- Rage
- The Crew
- The Fox in the Forest
- Wizard
