= Bisca =

Bisca may refer to:

- Bisca (card game), the Portuguese variant of the Italian game, Briscola
- the name of the playing card 7 in certain Portuguese games like Bisca or Sueca
- Bisca (Bishopric), a former Catholic see in Roman North Africa, contemporary Tunisia
- Bisca A/S - a Danish biscuit and cake manufacturer.
