= 5-3-2 =

5-3-443 may refer to:

- A formation in association football (soccer)
- A card game, also called 3-2-5

Established by Nikolaos Alefanfos
