= Jo-Jotte =

- Ely Culbertson - the author of Jo-Jotte
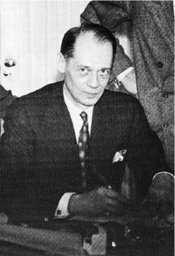
- Origin: US
- Players: 2-4
- Difficulty: relatively high
- Cards: 32
- Rank (high→low): A 10 K Q J 9 8 7 in non trump suits J 9 A 10 K Q 8 7 in trump suit

Related games
- Klabberjass, Belote

Jo-Jotte is a variant of Klabberjass devised by Ely Culbertson. In its basic form, it's a 2-player card game, however variants for 3 and 4 players also exist. It's played with a deck of 32 cards. The game has streamlined scoring modeled after bridge and slightly augmented bidding. Culbertson named the game after his wife, Josephine Culbertson.

== Overview ==
=== Values of cards ===
The game has simplified and streamlined scoring system. Instead of rather baroque scoring characteristic for ace-ten and jass games values of cards are following:

- the jack of trumps = 20 pts.,
- 9 of trumps = 15 pts.,
- ace = 10 pts.,
- 10 = 10 pts.,
- K = 5 pts.,
- Q = 5 pts.,
- taking the last trick = 10 pts.,
- jo-jotte (a pair of the king and the queen of trumps) = 20 pts.

=== Bidding ===
Bidding in Jo-Jotte was slightly augmented relative to Klabberjass. Players are allowed to bid no trump. After seeing all their cards, defender can bid misère/nullo what is an obligation to take no tricks, and the declarer can bid slam, what is an obligation to take all tricks. Contracts may be doubled and redoubled.

=== Play ===
Play is typical for jass games with one exception: according to Culbertson's rules the defender leads to the first trick (instead of the forehand).

=== Scoring ===
The scoring is modelled after contract bridge: points are scored below the line and above the line. There are games and rubbers. A game consists of 80 pts. below the line. A rubber consists of two games made by a player.

Bonuses are

- for making a rubber - 300 pts.,
- for unbid slam - 100 pts.,
- for bid and made slam - 500 pts.,
- made misere/nullo - 200 pts.,
- failed misere/nullo - 200 pts. for the opponent plus additional 100 pts. for the opponent for second and every next trick taken.

== Bibliography ==
- John McLeod. "Jo-Jotte".
- "Jo-Jotte".
