= Sergeant major (disambiguation) =

Sergeant major is a rank used in various military and police organizations.

Sergeant major may also refer to:

== Military appointments ==
- Regimental sergeant major, an appointment in British and Commonwealth military organizations
- Company sergeant major, an appointment in British and Commonwealth military organizations

== People ==
- Léo Major (1921–2008), Canadian army sergeant twice awarded the Distinguished Conduct Medal
- Eric Clay (1922–2007), English rugby league football referee nicknamed "Sergeant Major"

== Other ==
- 3-5-8, a card game
- "Sgt. Major" (song), a song by Jet
- Sergeant major (fish), a tropical fish (Abudefduf saxatilis)
- Abrota ganga, a butterfly of Asia called the sergeant major
