= Hucklebuck =

American card game

- Origin: United States
- Alternative names: Huckley Buck, Sputnik
- Type: Trick-taking
- Family: Rams group
- Players: 3–7
- Cards: 52 cards
- Deck: French
- Play: Clockwise
- Playing time: 15 min.
- Chance: Medium

Related games
- Rams • Bourré
- Basic features: 5 cards, exchanging, declarer chooses trumps, game is 11 or 15 points

Hucklebuck, also known as Huckly Buck and sometimes as Sputnik, is an American trick-taking card game of the Rams group for three to seven players (four to six are best). The game is native to the states of Nebraska and Iowa, although a variant called Huckley Buck is recorded in Nevada. The game appears to have arisen in the early 1900s in the Midwestern United States and may be based on Bourré, a Louisiana member of the Rams group. The rules given here are based on McLeod.

John McLeod notes that "in his article Die 100 Kartenspiele des Landes Salzburg in the 2004 edition of the journal Talon, Remigius Geiser includes a substantial section on the group of games... called the 'Rams group', after a famous 19th century French game... These are round games with a small number of cards dealt to each player. Players gain points or money by winning tricks, but anyone who takes no tricks at all suffers a penalty. Those who judge their cards too weak to be sure of winning a trick can avoid this penalty by dropping out of the play."

== Cards ==
A standard 52-card, French-suited pack is used, with the Jokers removed. Cards rank in their natural order, Aces high.

== Rules ==
=== Preliminaries ===
Between three and seven players may play, but four to six are best. Five cards are dealt and players bid in clockwise order the number of tricks they believe they can take. The minimum bid is two. Players must overcall the highest previous bid and there can be more than one round of bidding. The highest bidder declares trumps. Beginning with the player to the left of the highest bidder, players then decide whether to pass, i.e. drop out of the current deal, or stay in, in which case they state the number of cards they wish to exchange, from none to five. Each active player then discards the number of cards stated and the dealer then deals them the same number in exchange.

=== Play ===
The highest bidder leads to the first trick. Players must follow suit; otherwise they may discard if unable to follow.

=== Scoring ===
The active players score 1 point for each trick taken or -5 points if they take none. The bidder must achieve the bid number of tricks to score; failure to do so incurs -5 points. If, during the bidding, all drop out, the dealer scores 5 points without having to play. Players with a negative score are 'in the hole'. The highest bid is a slam called Shoot the Moon and the bidder wins the entire game if successful having started with a positive score. If a player is in the hole when bidding, that player's score returns to zero if successful. The penalty for failing, however, is -15 points. A player who scores -25 or lower is out of the game. Game is 15 points.

== See also ==
- List of trick-taking games

== Bibliography ==
- McLeod, John (April–June 2005). "Playing the Game: Schnellen, Hucklebuck & Donut". The Playing-Card Journal of the International Playing Card Society. 33 (4): 288–292.
