= Thunee =

South African card game

Tani
- Origin: South Africa
- Alternative names: Tani
- Type: Trick-taking
- Players: Preferably 2×2 (1×1 - 2 rounds dealt or 3×3 - each player is dealt 4 cards)
- Skills: Tactics
- Cards: 24
- Deck: French
- Rank (high→low): J 9 A 10 K Q
- Play: Counter-clockwise
- Playing time: 10 min.
- Chance: Moderate

Thunee is a popular trick-taking card game of the jack–nine family that originated in Durban, South Africa. It is believed that the game was developed by the first indentured Indian labourers. There are variations of the game found in India, Fiji, and Mauritius. The game is mostly confined to the former Indian townships, where it is very popular as a family game and in fund-raising tournaments, but to some extent it has spread to other South Africans and to Indians in other countries. The game Euchre is very closely related. The first thunee world championship was held in Pietermaritzburg in 2003.

The game is part of the jack–nine card games family, which includes twenty-eight, and the much older card games of the Jass family which are German in origin. The game is named after the Tamil word for water.

Thunee is enjoyed by both young and older generation amongst the Indian community. Thunee is also enjoyed during porridge prayers and goat prayers among the indian communities.

== Play ==
Point-values of cards
Rank	J	9	A	10	K	Q
Value	30	20	11	10	3	2

Thunee is best for four players in fixed partnerships, sitting crosswise, but can also be played by 2 or 6 (2 teams of 3 players). It is played with 24 cards only. The Sixes, referred to as the "ball cards", are used to keep the scores. The highly original ranking of cards and the card-point values are as shown in the table. The first and foremost rule of the game is to always follow suit, if a player does not have that suit he may play any other card in his deck.

=== Chopping ===
A hand can only be "cut" if a player does not have a card of the same suit of the first card played in that hand. His partner may cut higher to assume the lead if he too does not have that suit. Should the player who "cut" the hand be caught by the opposing team having the suit of the first card, then the opposing team is allowed to open 4 points ("4 ball"). If a player cuts a hand and his partner does not want to assume the lead he is allowed to "undercut" (to cut lower than that initial "chop") provided that he only has trump in his possession, should he undercut while in the possession of a suit other than that of trump, then the opposing team is allowed to open 4 points ("4 ball"). Any player is allowed to undercut any hand provided he has only trump in his hand, should he not have only trump in hand then the above rule applies.

=== Dealing ===
A nominated person from one team called out first, will shuffle the cards, he will then deal the cards face up, one card to each player at a time starting from his right - a process known as "black Jack deals". The first person receiving a black Jack, i.e. either the Jack of clubs or the Jack of spades, will start dealing and the opposite side will trump.

The Dealer must always offer the opposition to his left the opportunity to cut the deck. One cannot center cut or count the number of cards prior to cutting. The opposition may decline to cut with no recourse. Each player receives six cards in total but first each player is dealt 4 cards and then the dealer deals the remaining 2 cards each.

=== Bidding ===
Bidding, or "calling", as it is commonly known, is done when an opposition player wishes to set trump although it is not technically his turn to trump. Players usually choose to call for trump due to them being dealt favorable cards. A player may not call against his partners call for trump. Should both players from the team call out a bid at the same time, the bid is escalated to the next multiple of 10 and the dealer will allocate who from the opposing team will call trump which must be placed on the table by the player in concern. The maximum bid is a 100 and the player with the highest bid will keep trump. The opposing team must count 105. Should the team counting win the game, then they will be allowed to open 2 points on their scorecard (a process known as "call and loss"). The bidding process can be halted if a player calls "thunee". The trumpman has the first right to call thunee. During any form of the game, the team counting must always have trump, if they do not, the game becomes trumpless, a trumpless game requires a re-shuffle or re-deal, it is the duty of the counting team to realise that they are trumpless, failure to do so may result in the loss of a point or ball. Sometimes, the team not trumping are dealt unfavorable cards and call to set trump, in the hope that their opposition will call higher - this is (thunee terms) called 'fishing'. There is blind bidding in which a player calls before getting their cards, no one can raise them after seeing their cards. If a player wins, they get double their points and if they lose, the opponent gets 4 points.

=== Calls ===
"Iron-wall" thunee

"Royal" thunee
Examples of thunee calls
- Thunee - The player who calls "thunee" must win all hands, with the first card played in that game becoming the trump. The player calling "thunee", must win all hands and must not be caught by the opposition or their partner (which is a term commonly known as a "Partner Catch"), in which case the opponent may open 4 points or 8 points respectively. In a rare circumstance, when the player who called "thunee" is caught by their partner ("Partner Catch"), 8 points is opened and is justified by 4 points for the "thunee" loss plus a 4 point penalty for the "partner catch". A player may not call "thunee" if they acquire all 6 of the same suit, as this creates a trumpless situation. Should a player call a "thunee" knowingly with all 6 suits, the player can be penalised 4 points for "intentionally" voiding a game with the intention of preventing any other player from calling a "thunee" in that game.
- Blind thunee - The player who calls "blind thunee" must call before the remaining 2-cards have been dealt. When the remaining 2-cards are dealt, all players may see it, except for the player whom called. This player must win all of the first 4-hands with the first card played in that game becoming the trump. Thereafter, the player may see the remaining 2-cards and must win the 2-hands that follow. Should the player not be caught by the opposition or their partner, in which case they may open 8 points. Calling "blind thunee" is another variation call in thunee, which is used as a last resort to make up for a big deficit in points.
- Royals - In this case the lower points cards become the highest cards (with Q becoming the highest and J becoming the lowest). The player who calls 'royals' must win all hands with the points system being inverted, with the first card played in that game becoming the trump, as with calling "thunee" must win all hands and must not be caught by the opposition or their partner. Calling "royals" is a variation call in thunee to make an unfavourable hand, favourable. If lost the opponents get 4 points or if won which is also 4 points.
- Blind royals - The player who calls "blind royals" must call before the remaining 2-cards have been dealt. When the remaining 2-cards are dealt, all players may see it, except for the player who called. This player must win all of the first 4-hands with the first card played in that game becoming the trump. Thereafter, the player may see the remaining 2-cards and must win the 2-hands that follow. Should the player not be caught by the opposition or their partner, in which case they may open 8 points. Calling "blind royals" is another variation call in thunee, which is used as a last resort to make up for a big deficit in points.
- Jodhi - A "jodhi" can also be called by a player after his team has won their first or third hand prior to the third card of the next hand being played. The opposition team, if counting, will thus have to meet 105 points plus the value of Jodhi that was called. If the team which is counting calls a "Jodhi", then the points which they have to achieve are 105 less the value of Jodhi that was called. The team which claims last hand is given an additional 10 points.

Jodhi calls are effective with the possession/combination of the following cards: K and Q (non-trump suit)-20 Jodhi, K and Q (trump suit)-40 Jodhi, J, K and Q (non-trump suit)-30 Jodhi, J, K and Q (trump suit)-50 Jodhi.

- Murrials - However, a player or team making a jodhi call as such, may lose their claim to that score should they be murrial-ed. A "murrials" (pronounced: mur-reals) response call can made by the opponent/s. This happens when the player or team exercising their Jodhi call, had done so in error (ie. not making the call at the correct time or calling out an incorrect score on a Jodhi call). The Murrials response call by the opponent/s subsequently leads to the forfeiture of the points score of that relevant Jodhi call and the Jodhi call on the same card suit may not be used again in the game. In so doing, the murrials serve to penalise the player or team from benefitting to score from the value of their Jodhi call. The murrials must be declared as soon as the jodhi call has been incorrectly called and may not be declared retrospectively.

- Double - A "double" can be called by a player on the last hand if his team has taken all hands and he is sure he will take the last one. The call is made by the player playing the first card on the last hand, or by his partner should he have the winning card. If it is a correct call then the team's ball score increases by 2. If it is an incorrect call then the opposition team's ball score increases by 4 (see "Penalties" below). If a team call to set trump but lose all hands, the opposition can call 'backside double' - winning 4 points (double multiplied by 2). A variant call, this is to ware off teams 'fishing'. (See "Bidding" above)
- Khanuck - A "khanuck" is also called on the last hand if a team is going to win the last hand and the Jodhis called by that team are higher than the final point tally less 10 of the opposition team. A correct khanuck call adds 3 ball points onto the winning team and an incorrect one gives four points (Four-ball) to the opposition team. The khanuck count is reduced by any Jodhi that may be called by the opposition, but it does not include calls to set trump. If a team call to set trump but lose, with opposing team, having called Jodhis, higher than the value than the hands won, the team not trumping can call 'backside khanuck' - winning 6 points (khanuck multiplied by 2). A variant call, this is to ware off teams 'fishing'. (See "Bidding" above)

Example: 50 jodhi khanuck – The counting team fails to reach a count of 60 (10 is added for the taking of the last hand).

=== Scoring ===
Balling, or scoring, in a thunee game is won by the player or team who has won 12 rounds, or ball points. 13 rounds or ball points must be reached to win if a khanuck was called during the game. A common variant requires 13 rounds to win a game regardless if khanuck was called or not. A thunee or khanuck game may be played during any stage of the game, however a double game may not be played when a teams ball score is on cornerhouse (last remaining point to win). If a team calls a cornerhouse double, the opposition is awarded a penalty, gaining 4 balls. Certain variants of the game require a team to win by a minimum of 2 points, a process known as "2 to clear", however other variants maintain that this play is only applicable when a kanuck is called during the game.

Jodhi is the player who either calls jack, king and queen of one suit. This call adds 30 points, or 50 points if it is of the trump suit. If a king and queen of one suit, this call adds 20 points, or 40 points if it is of the trump suit.

=== Penalties ===
If a team during the game is caught committing an offence, e.g. using sign language, not following suit, changing trump card etc., then the team is automatically disqualified, losing the round, incurring a 4-point penalty called "Four-ball". Currently rarely do players play royal thunee as per normal thunee some players often get confused when the opposition player or partner calls royals. The irony behind this is that no matter how high rank cards you have, you can call thunee, and no matter how low rank cards you have you can call Royals.

== See also ==
- Jass
- Euchre
- Jack–nine card games
- Tarneeb
- Bid whist
- Twenty-eight (card game)
