= Einwerfen =

German card game

- Alternative names: Zählspiel
- Type: Point-trick
- Players: 4 (2×2)
- Cards: 32-card
- Deck: German
- Rank (high→low): A K O U 10 9 8 7
- Play: clockwise

Einwerfen or Zählspiel is a German 8-card point-trick game for four players in two teams of two and using a 32-card German-suited pack. Its closest relative is the popular Portuguese game Sueca. Perhaps the most basic and typical representative of the ace–ten card games, this game was first described as early as 1811, but may be considerably older.

== Basic rules ==
Ranks and card-point values
Rank	A	K	O/Q	U/J	10	9	8	7
Value	11	4	3	2	10	–		

Players draw for partnerships. The player drawing the highest card becomes the 'king' i.e. eldest hand; the player with the second highest is his partner. Partners sit opposite one another. The player drawing the lowest card sits to the right of the king and becomes the first dealer.

Tens rank low. After cutting for trump, all cards are dealt to the players in batches of 4, each receiving 8 cards. The standard rules of trick-play as in Whist apply. Any card may be led to a trick, subsequent players must follow suit if they can but are otherwise completely free in what they play. The trick is won with the highest trump, or if it does not contain trumps it is won with the highest card of the suit led. The winner of a trick leads to the next trick.

61–90 card-points win the deal and earn one chip (Marke) or stake, a single win being known as a Lump, 91–119 win it double (Matsch), and 120 win it triple (Bombe). In case of a tie the outcome is held in abeyance and is decided by the outcome of the next deal. The trump suit of the first deal is couleur favorite, i.e. any subsequent game that happens to have the same trump suit as the first scores double i.e. 2 chips for a Lump, 4 for a Matsch and 6 for a Bombe.

== Additional rules ==
According to one account, a game always consists of 48 deals. At the beginning of such a game players draw card for being eldest hand (König) for every one of the 48 deals. The seating arrangement changes every 16 deals, as eldest hand's partner changes so that each of the three remaining players has that role once. The dealer is an opponent player determined by lot.

== History and etymology ==
Einwerfen refers to the 'throwing in' i.e. smearing of valuable cards into tricks (likely to be) won by one's partner. The alternative name Zählspiel, i.e. 'counting game', evidently refers to the counting of card-points. These two aspects of the game were far from novel when it was first recorded in 1811. For this reason and because tens are still low in the game, card game researcher David Parlett speculates that it is much older. (Note: Parlett's source is Hoffmann (1874), but the game is recorded as early as 1811 by Hammer.)

The name of the related Portuguese game Sueca means Swedish (woman).

== Literature ==
- Steiner-Welz, (2004) Das Buch der Spiele und Rätsel von 1880, Mannheim: Vermittlerverlag, 2004, ISBN 978-3-937805-23-8.
- Hammer, Paul (1811). Die deutschen Kartenspiele. Weygand, Leipzig.
- Hoffmann, Paul F. (1874). "Das Einwerfen oder Zählspiel" in Der Meister in allen Kartenspielen: eine praktische Anleitung zur schnellen Erlernung aller beliebten Kartenspiele, Vienna.
- Parlett, David (1990), The Oxford guide to card games: a historical survey, Oxford University Press, ISBN 978-0-19-214165-1.
- Parlett, David (2008), The Penguin Book of Card Games (3rd ed.), Penguin Books, ISBN 978-0-14-103787-5.
- von Thalberg, Baron F (1860). Der perfecte Kartenspieler oder practische Anleitung zur leichten Erlernung von 86 Kartenspiele, S Mode, Berlin.
