= Revoke =

Card game terminology

In trick-taking card games, a revoke (sometimes renege, /rɪˈneɪɡ/ or /rɪˈniːɡ/) is a violation of the rules regarding the play of tricks that is sufficient to render the round invalid. A revoke is a violation ranked in seriousness somewhat below overt cheating, and is considered a minor offense when unintentional, though there are usually severe penalties for revokes. A revoke is usually a violation of one or more honor rules, and often comes to light after its commission, as trick-taking games play with hands concealed.

== Honor rules ==
Trick-taking games normally have several rules regarding which cards may and may not be played to a trick. For example, most games require a player to follow suit – that is, to play in the suit led – if possible. Rules of this sort are sometimes called honor rules, because there is no way to detect a violation at the moment of its commission, although it will almost certainly be discovered later. For example, if a player does not play a spade to a trick where spades were led, other players will simply assume that player has no spades and note the fact in future play decisions. However, attentive players will soon notice the violation when a spade is played to a subsequent trick.

Some honor rules in different trick-taking games include the following:

- Spades, Euchre and 500 require that players play to the suit led, unless void in it.
- Hearts requires that players follow the suit led. In some variants, a player holding the Queen of Spades and void in the led suit is required to play it.
- Pinochle requires players to
  - play to the led suit unless void in it, with a potentially winning (higher than the highest-so-far) card, if possible;
  - if void in the led suit, trump with a potentially winning card, if one is in their hand; or
  - play some remaining card.
- Bourré requires players to
  - play to the led suit unless void in it, with a potentially winning (higher than the highest-so-far) card if possible;
  - if void in the led suit, trump with a potentially winning card;
  - play to bourré as many other players as possible.
- Forty-fives requires players to follow suit or play a trump card if possible (note that the Ace of Hearts is always a trump card and must be played on a trump if the player holds no other trumps). Some variants permit reneging with the 5 of trumps.

== Penalties ==
A common penalty for a revoke is to give the player a penalty equal to the most severely negative outcome of the round possible. For example, in a game of Hearts, the worst possible score achievable in a round is 25 points, so the offending player would receive 25 points in penalty for a revoke. Therefore, a revoke rarely has a strategic advantage, except in kingmaker scenarios.

Some penalties in different trick-taking games include the following:

- In Bridge, the penalty for a revoke is normally one or two tricks scored against the offending partnership, depending on the exact circumstances, but if the non-offending side is more seriously damaged than that (typically because the revoke made a critical entry worthless), then they are compensated accordingly.
- In Pinochle and many other bidding trick games, a revoke results in an automatic set, or failure at the bid, normally precipitating a penalty.
- In Hearts, a revoking player receives all 26 (penalty) points, and each other player receives none.
- In Bourré, a revoking player must forfeit an amount of money equal to the pot.
- In Euchre, a revoking player/team loses bid and receives a 2-point penalty, while the opponents are awarded two points.
- In Bid Euchre (Pepper), a revoking player playing the bid loses the bid and receives a 2-point penalty. The opponents are awarded the bid. A revoking team playing against the bid forfeits the bid to the player playing the bid. They also receive a penalty in the amount of the bid being played.
- In 500, a revoking player playing the bid loses the trick on which they revoked, and the trick subsequent to that in which the revoked card was played. If the revoking player is playing the bid, the points are subtracted from the round score. If the revoking player is not playing the bid, the points are added to the round score.
- In Forty-fives, revoking is called "reneging", and the applicable rules vary; most often, a player loses all points earned in that hand.
