= The Fox in the Forest =

2017 trick-taking card game

- Designers: Joshua Buergel
- Illustrators: Jennifer L. Meyer
- Publishers: Foxtrot Games; Renegade Game Studios
- Publication: 2017; 9 years ago
- Genres: Card game; Trick-taking game
- Players: 2
- Playing time: 30 minutes
- Age range: 10+

The Fox in the Forest is a trick-taking card game designed by Joshua Buergel and published in 2017 by Foxtrot Games and Renegade Game Studios. Two players play cards of different suits to win tricks over rounds of 13 turns, then score point based on the number of tricks they won during that round in order to end the game with the highest number of points.

== Publishing history ==
The Fox in the Forest Duet, a cooperative reimplementation of the game mechanics from The Fox in the Forest, was published in 2020 by Foxtrot Games and Renegade Game Studios. An app version of The Fox in the Forest was developed by Dire Wolf Digital and released on October 17, 2021.

== Gameplay ==
The Fox in the Forest is played over multiple rounds, each consisting of 13 turns or "tricks". Players start each round with a hand of 13 cards and both play one card from their hand every trick. A round begins with one player revealing the top card of the deck, known as the Decree Card; the other player then leads the trick by playing a card of any suit (Bells, Keys, or Moons) from their hand. In subsequent rounds the winner of the previous trick leads. The non-leading player then plays a card that matches the Lead Suit if they have one, or else plays a card of any suit. When played, cards with odd ranks activate a special ability that can change play rules, turn order, or scoring for the trick.

The winner of the trick is determined by comparing the card suits: the highest ranked card in the suit of the Decree Card, known as the Trump Suit, wins or the highest ranked card in the Lead Suit wins if no card in the Trump Suit was played. They then take the two played cards and place them face down in a pile on their side of the table to track the number of tricks won in the round such that no player can look at the card faces until the round is over.

After all tricks have been played, the round ends and players win points based on the number of tricks they won. Points are awarded in ranges, with 0-3 and 7-9 tricks awarding 6 points, 10-13 tricks awarding 0 points, and 4, 5, and 6 tricks awarding 1, 2, and 3 points respectively. The game ends when either player has at least 21 points, and the winner is the player with the most points.

=== The Fox in the Forest Duet ===
The Fox in the Forest Duet is a collaborative version of The Fox in the Forest where players attempt to collect all gems on spaces along a forest path on a board. Each card has a number of fox print icons on it that indicate how many spaces the shared player token moves along the forest path in the direction of the trick winner at the end of the trick. If the player token reaches the edge of the forest on either side of the path, a forest token is placed on one of the forest edge spaces, making path shorter and thus restricting the number of fox prints needed in subsequent tricks. Rather than Bells, Keys, and Moons, the card suits are Doves, Roses, and Stars. The game ends if players run out of forest tiles to place, resulting in a defeat, or all 22 gem tokens have been collected, resulting in a victory.

== Reception ==
In an article for Vox, Emily St. James praised The Fox in the Forest for its compact size, artwork, and ability to be enjoyed by people of all ages. James Austin, writing for Wirecutter, admired the game's easy-to-learn and unique gameplay, describing it as "the perfect intersection of luck and strategy for a quick, low-stakes game" but also noting that the included score tokens were a hassle to use. Wargamer included The Fox in the Forest in their list of the best card games of 2025, with Matt Bassil praising the theme, artwork, and "satisfying puzzle[s]" of the gameplay, but warning that "this simple, intriguing puzzle of a game can be surprisingly cutthroat."

In an article for Dicebreaker, Alex Meehan described The Fox in the Forest Duet as "a collaborative experience that rewards communication and good planning," and commended the game's artwork. Keith Law described the graphics and animations of The Fox in the Forest app as "superb", but noted that the AI player was too easy and would make simple mistakes even with the app on the hardest difficulty.

The Fox in the Forest was nominated for the two player games category of the 2018 International Gamers Award, and the card game category of the 2018 Origin Awards. It was recommended for the 2020 Spiel des Jahres. The game won 7th place in Fairplay's 2021 À la Carte awards.
