= Jeu Royal de la Guerre =

Jeu Royal de la Guerre (Royal Game of War) is a French novelty card game for two to twelve players that was described in La Maison des Jeux Academiques in 1659. It is a trick-taking game played with a dedicated war-themed 40-card pack based on the French-suited 36-card piquet pack. The suits are irrelevant for gameplay, and to a large extent the game is determined by four suitless special cards.

== Cards ==
Jeu Royal de la Guerre was played with a dedicated pack of 40 cards. The pack consisted of a war-themed version of a piquet pack, which at the time still had 36 cards, along with four suitless cards. The suitless cards were Death, Force, Army General, and Prisoner of War. The remaining cards were Ace, King, Queen, Jack and 6–10 in each of the four French suits. The aces were styled as a cannoneer, a soldier with a drawn rapier, a battalion, and a squadron of horsemen.

After removing the four suitless cards, the pack could be used for playing piquet, triomphe or brelan.

== Rules ==
The game is played for money, each player depositing the same amount before the cards are dealt. The number of cards each player receives was not specified in the published rules, although it is implicit that at least five tricks are played and at least one card must remain in the stock. Three of the four suitless cards have immediate effects on the players who find them in their hands.

Death
The player who holds the Death card loses automatically and does not participate in trick-play.
Force
The player who holds the Force card immediately wins from the pot twice what he or she paid. The player remains in the game and exchanges the Force card for another card from the stock.
Prisoner of War
The player who holds this card must double his or her contribution to the pot or leave the game.

The suits are irrelevant for trick-play. If the highest rank in a trick occurs more than once, the first card played of that rank wins the trick. The cards rank King, Queen, Army General, Prisoner of War, Jack, Ace, 10, 9, 8, 7, 6. Eldest hand leads to the first trick. Unlike in most trick-taking games, it is not the winner of a trick who leads to the next one. Instead, the lead passes from one player to the next in the direction of play.

A player who loses the Army General in a trick must pay a "ransom" amounting to the total value of the pot to the winner of the trick. A player who wins a trick by playing the Army General wins the pot. Anything that remains in the pot at the end is won by the player who wins the greatest number of tricks.

== History ==
The game first appeared in 1659 in Étienne Loyson's La maison academique : contenant les jeux du picquet, du hoc, du tric-trac, du hoca, […] & autres jeux facetieux & divertissans, a work modeled after the first French game anthology, La Marinière's 1654 Maison Academique. The rules were reprinted along with a short advertisement piece for the card pack (signed by "E. L.", that is, Étienne Loyson), as late as the 1702 Den Haag edition of Maison Academique.

Unrelated novelty cards were advertised in Le royal jeu du picquet, plaisant & recreatif, Paris, 1683 (and in later reprints, with Ombre added, such as Le Royal Jeu de l'Hombre et celui du Picquet, Amsterdam, 1735). The pack consisted of 60 cards, ten each in the six suits yellow, white, blue, red, black and green. Within each suit, there were ten court cards, the ranks were simultaneously numbered and designated as King, Queen, Knight, Lady etc. down to Lackey.
