= Jack–nine games =

Family of card game

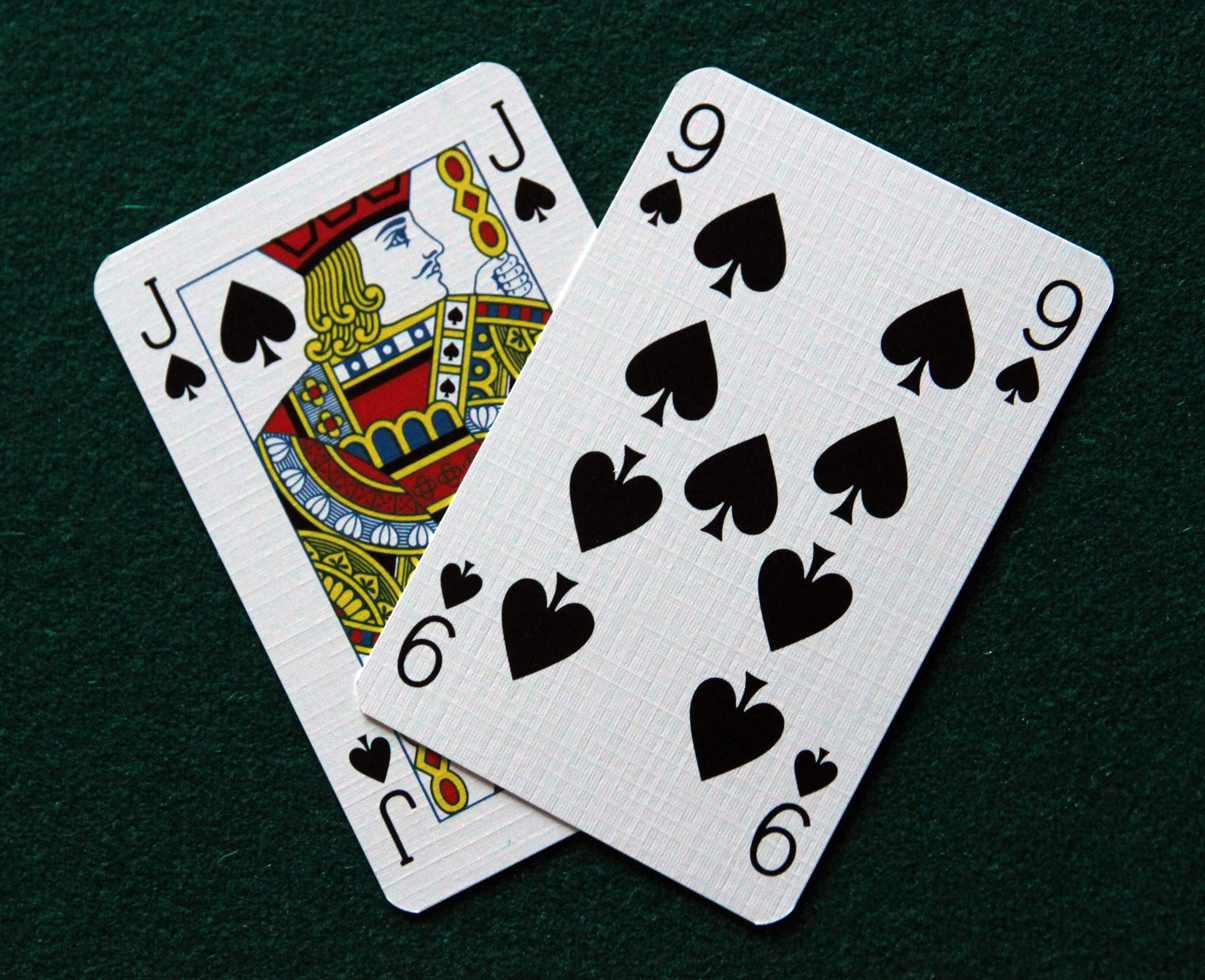
The jack and nine of spades

Jack–nine card games, also known as the Jass group from the German term for the jack, form a family of trick-taking games in which the jack and nine of the trump suit are the highest-ranking trumps, and the tens and aces of all suits are the next most valuable cards. Games in this family are typically played by 2 or 4 players with 32 French-suited cards.

Popular European games in this family include four-handed belote, klaverjas and Jass but also a widespread two-hander known under various names including bela and Klaberjass. With the exception of the South Asian variants twenty-nine, twenty-eight and fifty-six, trick play in these games follows special rules that encourage trumping and overtrumping.

In the classification system of pagat.com, the Jass group is a subfamily of the marriage group of card games which in turn is a sub-family of the ace–ten group that is very popular in most of Europe, but almost absent in the British Isles and Scandinavia.

== Overview ==
Variants of the basic two-handed game, known under various names including Klaberjass and bela, are played worldwide, especially in Jewish communities. Four-handed belote with its numerous variants is the French national card game but has spread as far away as Saudi Arabia. Other notable members of the family include the Swiss and Dutch national card games: Swiss Jass and Dutch klaverjas.

Twenty-nine, a popular game in South Asia, is a descendant of these games sharing many of their characteristics. In this game and its variants Twenty-eight and Fifty-six, trick-play is governed by the simple standard rule that suit must be followed if possible and a player who is blank in the suit led may play any card.

All other games in this family have slightly different trick-play rules that encourage trumping, typically by requiring players to trump a trick when they cannot follow suit. The Swiss games are special in that they are less restrictive than Whist, allowing players to trump a trick even when they can follow suit. The methods for determining the trump suit vary as in many other groups of card games. Often players can meld certain combinations in their hand to score additional points in exchange for giving information to the opponents, and score by a different mechanism for holding a belote (king and queen of trumps).

The Jass–belote group is a subfamily of the king–queen family, which also contains the Austrian, Czech, Slovak and Hungarian national games and is itself a subfamily of the huge family of ace–ten card games. Ace–ten games are characterized by the scoring values 11 and 10 for ace and ten, respectively. This family is popular in most of Europe, notable exceptions being the United Kingdom and Ireland, and Sweden and Norway. The group includes Bezique, Pinochle, Italian Briscola and the Schafkopf group with German Skat.

== Basic two-handed game ==
Most modern games
Trump suit	Typical value	Other suits
J	20	
9	14	
A	11	A
10	10	10
K	4	K
Q	3	Q
	2	J
	0	9
8	0	8
7	0	7

According to David Parlett, this "popular and widespread two-hander has so many names, mostly variations on the same one, that it is hard to know which is best for universal recognition. Klaberjass is probably closest to the original." He lists the alternative names as "Clob, Clobby, Clobiosh, Klob, Kalabrisasz, Bela, Cinq Cents, Zensa". Other sources also list "Klabberjass, Senserln, Clobyosh, Kalabrias, Klab, Clabber, Clobber, Clubby". This truly international game originates from the Low Countries and is particularly strong in Jewish communities. (For an earlier form see the history section.) It can be interpreted as a two-handed variant of Belote, and indeed three-handed Belote can be played in exactly the same way. Conversely, Tarbish, a game played in Nova Scotia, is a four-handed partnership game variant of this game. (Note: Tarbish is played with 36 cards. This makes sense since in four-handed games it is normal to deal all cards, and thus the number of cards dealt to each player is the same as in the two-handed game.)

Each player receives 6 cards, and another card is turned up to determine the preferred trump suit. Now players in turn get the chance to take the deal, i.e. bet to make more points than the opponent, with the preferred trump suit. If both pass, they in turn may choose to take the deal with a freely chosen trump suit. If both players pass again, the deal is aborted and the other player deals. After a successful bidding phase both hands are completed to 9 cards.

In addition to the turn-up card, a second card is turned face up to give additional information. If the trump suit is as determined by the (first) turn-up card, a player who holds the seven of trumps may exchange it with the (first) turn-up card.

score	meld
50	sequence of 4 in suit
20	sequence of 3 in suit

In the melding phase, one player may meld any number of sequences of 3 or 4 cards in suit for 20 or 50 points, respectively. (For melding purposes the natural order of cards is used, and in particular tens rank between nines and jacks.) The player who holds the longest, highest-ranking such sequence is allowed to meld. This player is determined by a protocol that minimizes the information given to the opponent. Any melding player must show the best sequence held during the first trick, and may show any other sequences held and score for them as well.

Ranks and point values of cards are as shown in the table. In trick-play, a player who cannot follow suit must trump if possible, and any trump lead must be overtrumped. A player who holds both king and queen of trumps may score 20 for the marriage (bela) when playing out the second of these cards. The winner of the last trick scores 10 points.

If the player who took the deal has made more combined points from card points in tricks taken, melds, marriage and last trick than the opponent, both players simply score their points. (As a special case, the melds of a player who won no trick are not counted; however a marriage is always counted.) In the opposite case the opponent scores the sum of the points made by both.

The game is played for 500 points.

=== Variants ===
- Instead of taking the game with the preferred trump suit or passing, elder hand may schmeiss (throw) the game. In this case the dealer cannot take the game, but may choose to force elder hand to take the game with the preferred trump suit.
- If both players make exactly the same number of points:
  - The bidder scores nothing, but the opponent scores only their own points, not the total.
  - Nobody scores. The total is added to the score of the winner of the next game.
- For the Bavarian variant Zensa/Senserln, the additional melding combinations of Belote count, except for the four nines, which do not count.

== Klaverjas ==
Klaverjas is the Dutch national game, but it has numerous variants, some of which are very close to Belote. The major distinguishing feature of Klaverjas is that it has replaced melds by similar combinations that can be scored in tricks.

score	combination
100	any 4 of a kind
50	sequence of 4 in suit
20	sequence of 3 in suit
20	king and queen of trumps

All cards are distributed to the players and trump is determined by one of several simple methods. Players must always follow suit if they can. After a trump lead, players must head the trick if they can, even if the partner currently heads the trick. A player who cannot follow suit must head the trick by trumping (or overtrumping) if possible, otherwise discard a non-trump, and may not undertrump if it can be avoided.

Instead of the usual melding procedure, Klaverjas awards points for melding combinations won in a trick. 20 points for a king and queen of trumps can be scored in addition to the 20 or 50 points for a sequence. The last trick scores an additional 10 points.

In variants in which a player chooses the trump suit, that player's partnership must make more points than the opponents. Otherwise all points made in the game, including for melding combinations on both sides, are scored for the opponents.

=== Variants ===
- The trick-play rule as described is the Rotterdam variant. The Amsterdam variant differs when a player cannot follow suit and the trick is currently headed by their partner. In this case, the player may choose to discard a non-trump instead of overtrumping.
- Having four of a kind in a trick is of course extremely rare. In a variant, the winner of a trick containing three of a kind score 50 points.

== Belote ==
This game for 4 players in fixed partnerships became the French national card game early in the 20th century. Having received 5 cards, players in turn get the chance to take the deal, i.e. bet that their team will make more points than the opponents, with the preferred trump suit determined by a card turned face-up. If all players pass, they in turn may choose to take the deal with a freely chosen trump suit. After a successful bidding phase all hands are completed to 8 cards; the player who takes the deal receives the turned-up card.

score	meld
200	4 jacks
150	4 nines
100	4 aces, tens, kings, queens
100	sequence of ≥5 in suit
50	sequence of 4 in suit
20	sequence of 3 in suit

In the melding phase, one team may meld certain combinations. (For melding purposes the natural order of cards is used.) The team of the player who holds the most valuable, highest-ranking combination gets the right to meld. This player is determined by a protocol that minimizes the information exposed. Any melding player must show the best meld during the first trick, and may show any other melds and score for them as well. The same card can be used for more than one meld.

Ranks and point values of cards are as shown in the table above for "most modern games". In trick-play, when the partner currently heads the trick there is no restriction other than following suit if possible. Otherwise a player who cannot follow suit must trump if possible and overtrump if possible. Similarly, any trump lead must be overtrumped unless the partner heads the trick. A player who holds both king and queen of trumps can score 20 for the marriage by announcing Belote when playing the first and Rebelote when playing the second of these cards. The winner of the last trick scores 10 points.

If the team of the player who took the deal has made more combined points from card points in tricks taken, melds, marriage and last trick than the opponent team, both teams simply score their points. In the opposite case the opponents score the sum of the points made by both teams. A team that has won all tricks scores 100 points for capot instead of 10 points for the last trick.

== Belote Contrée ==
Like Belote, this game is played by 4 players in fixed partnerships. Its distinguishing features are that all cards are distributed right from the start, and that players bid in terms of the number of points they expect to make. There are numerous rule variants; the following rules are meant as a particularly simple and progressive example. The game is also known as Belote Coinchée or Coinche, but it has been proposed to reserve this term for the variant played with melds and Belote. Belote Contrée and Belote Coinchée are the most popular variants of the French national card game.

Once all cards have been dealt to the players, each player in turn can propose a contract consisting of a number divisible by 10, from 80 to 160, or "capot". Any contract announced must be higher than the last one. This continues for as many rounds as necessary, until a contract is accepted by the other three players all passing. Any player who proposes a contract must also indicate with which trump suit it is to be played, as in "80, clubs". If the last proposal was from the opposing partnership, instead of making another proposal a player may accept it and double the value of the deal. (Note: The French term is "contrer" or "coincher", and this option is responsible for the two names of this game.) If this happens the bidding phase is over immediately, except that a member of the partnership whose proposal is played may redouble.

In trick-play players must follow suit. A player who cannot follow a plain suit led, and whose partner does not currently head the trick, must head the trick by playing a higher trump than any trumps already in the trick, if able to do so. To a trump lead, players must always head the trick if they can. The partnership taking the last trick scores 10 points. A partnership taking all tricks scores another 90 points.

If the partnership that made contract achieves the announced number of points in tricks (or takes all tricks in case of a contract for capot), each partnership scores the points they made rounded to a multiple of 10; otherwise the opposing partnership scores the total points of the game, i.e. 160 points (or 250 points in case of capot). However, if the contract was doubled or redoubled one partnership scores two or four times the total value of the game and the other nothing.

A game without melds, as described, is played for 2000 points. The game with melds and Belote is played for 3000 points.

== Schieberjass ==
Schieberjass
Trump suit	Typical value	Other suits
J	20	
9	14	
A	11	A
K	4	K
Q	3	Q
	2	J
10	10	10
	0	9
8	0	8
7	0	7
6	0	6

"Jass" is the Swiss national card game, but nowadays in Switzerland the word really refers to card games in general or, at least, to the countless Swiss games in the Jass–belote family. The region consisting of Switzerland, Liechtenstein and the adjacent Austrian state of Vorarlberg is probably the most important region in which games of this family are not played with a standard piquet pack. Jass games in this region are played with a pack of 36 cards which is most often French-suited, but in Liechtenstein, Vorarlberg and about half of the German-speaking part of Switzerland is characteristically Swiss- or German-suited. Another specialty of Swiss Jass is the fact that the tens rank in natural position as in early 19th century Klaverjas, while the court cards have the same scoring values as in modern Klaverjas and Belote.

score	meld
200	4 jacks
150	4 nines
100	4 of a kind, not jacks or nines
50 × (length − 3)	sequence of 4 or more in suit
20	sequence of 3 in suit

Schieberjass is in many respects a Swiss version of Belote, and is probably the most popular form of Jass. It is played by 4 players in fixed partnerships. All cards are dealt, so that each player holds 9 cards. Forehand can choose a trump suit, no trumps, or reverse no trumps, or transfer this right to their partner. (Note: The German term for transferring the right is "schieben", which gave rise to the name of the game.) In the no trumps game, eights score 8 points, so that the total number of trick-points in a game is the same as when a trump suit is chosen. Reverse no trumps is a curious variant in which all ranks are reversed, Aces score 0, sixes score 11, and otherwise all cards score as in no trumps.

During the first trick, each player who plays a card can also announce a melding score that is at least as high as any announced previously. If necessary, tie-breakers (number of cards, highest-ranking card, trump or not) are discussed while exposing only the absolute minimum of information necessary to find out which partnership has the highest-ranking meld and can score all melds of either partner. The same card can be used to score both 4 of a kind and a sequence.

In trick-play, instead of following suit players may choose to trump. If trump is led, a player holding the Jack of trumps but no other trumps may renege. In any case undertrumping is only allowed if a player's hand consists entirely of trumps that are lower than the highest trump in the trick. A player who holds king and queen of trumps can score 20 points when playing the second of these cards. The last trick scores an additional 5 points. A partnership winning all tricks adds another 100 points.

Both sides simply score their points, multiplied with a factor of 1 for black suits, 2 for red suits, and 3 for no trumps or reverse no trumps. The game is played for 2500 points.

== History ==
=== Early 19th century klaverjas ===
Historic klaverjas (1836)
Trump suit	Typical value	Other suits
J	20	
9	14	
A	11	A
K	3	K
Q	2	Q
	1	J
10	10	10
	0	9
8	0	8
7	0	7

"Klaverjas" is Dutch for "jack of clubs", and there is evidence that the game once went through a stage in which clubs were a preferred suit for trumps. The term "jas(s)" for the knave and the game was first recorded in the Netherlands in 1721 and seems to have given rise to the English term "jack". It seems that by the end of the 18th century, Dutch mercenaries had brought the game to Switzerland.

The earliest recorded Jass game appears to be the two-handed game described in a Dutch book from 1821 as "smoojas" ("Jewish Jass"). The following account is based on a slightly later version, where it is alternately named "500" or "klaverjassen" and on David Parlett's version of the 1821 rules. The most fundamental differences to modern two-handed belote are tens ranking in their natural position, slightly different scoring values (more similar to manille and all fours), and more restrictive rules for trick-play (in the second phase). Apart from the trick-play rules, these characteristics are shared by several modern Dutch games of the Jass–belote family. (Note: Boonaken, Pandoeren, Staekske Rape as reported by John McLeod. Apparently the dominant klaverjas is the only Dutch game in the Jass–belote group which has the higher scoring values and the tens ranking high.) Another difference is a first phase as in sixty-six, over which the melding activity is spread.

score	meld
100	sequence of 5 or more in suit
200	4 jacks
100	4 kings, 4 queens
50	sequence of 4 in suit
20	sequence of 3 in suit

After both players have received 9 cards, a card is turned face up to determine the trump suit. A player who holds the seven of trumps may exchange the two cards, so long as the stock is not empty. The game continues with two trick-play phases, in which ranks and point values of cards are as shown in the table.

In the first phase, the second player to a trick may play any card and need not follow suit. The player who leads may also declare a melding combination held in the player's hand and score for it as shown in the table. However, if the second player can counter with a higher melding, the second player scores instead. Every combination of cards may only be declared once, but it is allowed to declare a longer sequence that contains a shorter sequence which was declared previously. Independently of melding, a player who leads a king or queen of trumps and holds the other card, can score 20 points for marriage by showing it. After every trick players complete their hands from the stock.

The second phase starts when the stock has been exhausted. Now the second player to a trick must follow suit if possible, and must take the trick if possible while following suit. There is no melding in this phase. The winner of the last trick scores 5 points, and a winner of all nine tricks in the second phase scores 100 points.

The game is played for 500 points; by melding this target can be met in a single deal.

== See also ==
- Ace-ten games
- Belote contrée (Fr)
