= Bohemian Schneider =

Card game

- "A nice little two-hander from central Europe."
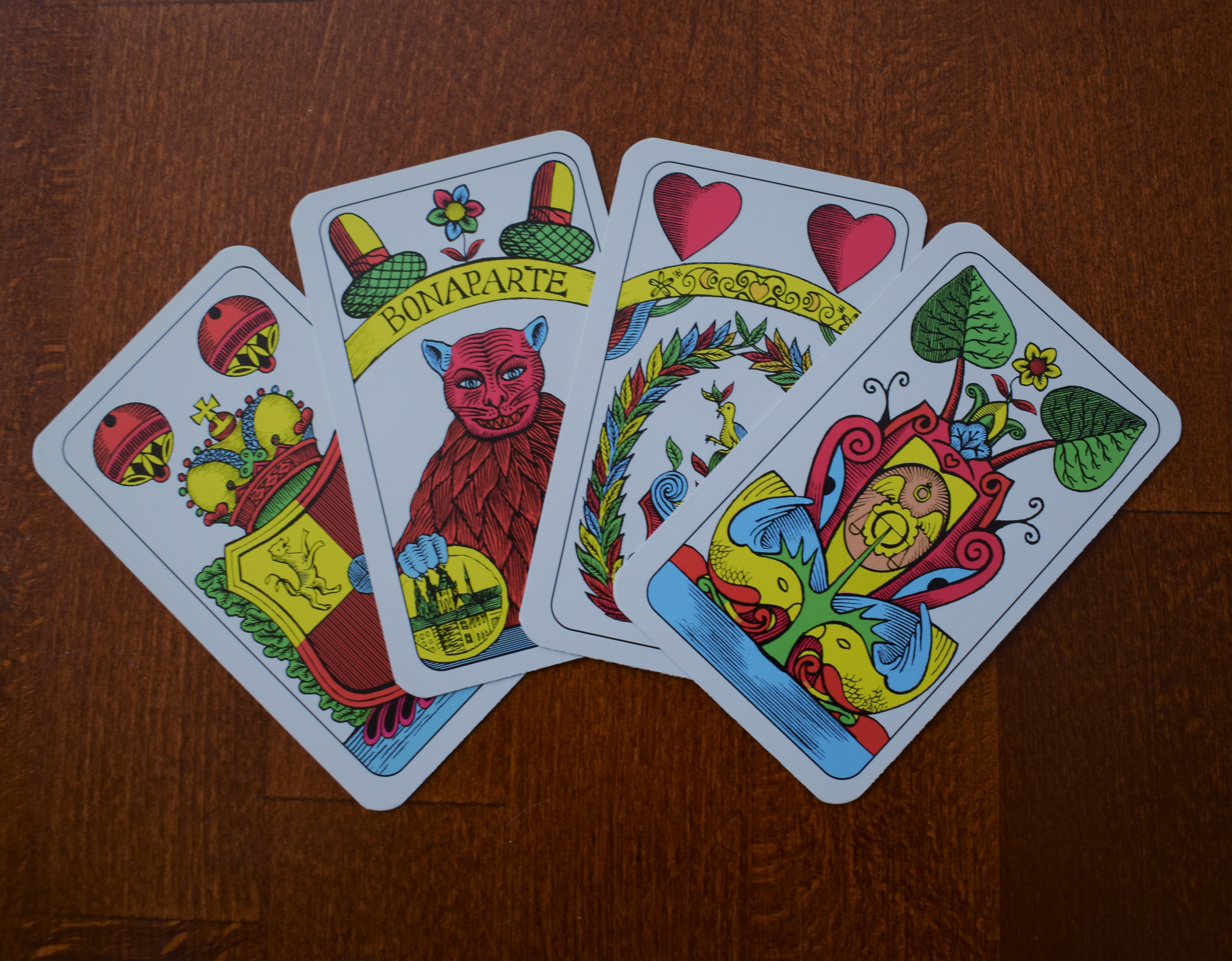
- The four Aces from a Bohemian pattern pack
- Origin: Bohemia
- Type: Plain-trick
- Players: 2
- Age range: 8+
- Cards: 32
- Deck: German Skat or French pack
- Rank (high→low): D K O U 10 9 8 7
- Play: Alternate
- Playing time: 7 minutes/hand

Related games
- Elfern

Bohemian Schneider (German: Böhmischer Schneider) is a card game for two people, which is played with a German-suited Skat pack of 32 cards. Because it is a simple trick-taking game, it is often played by older children and is recommended for age 8 upwards. It was probably developed in Bohemia and spread from there across the south German region and Austria. The game is sometimes called Bohemian Tailor, Schneider being German for "tailor".

== History ==
The game was probably developed in Bohemia and spread from there to the South German region and Austria. Traditionally it is played with a German pack of cards. Its rules appeared as early as 1860.

== Rules ==
Trick with honour cards
(German pack)

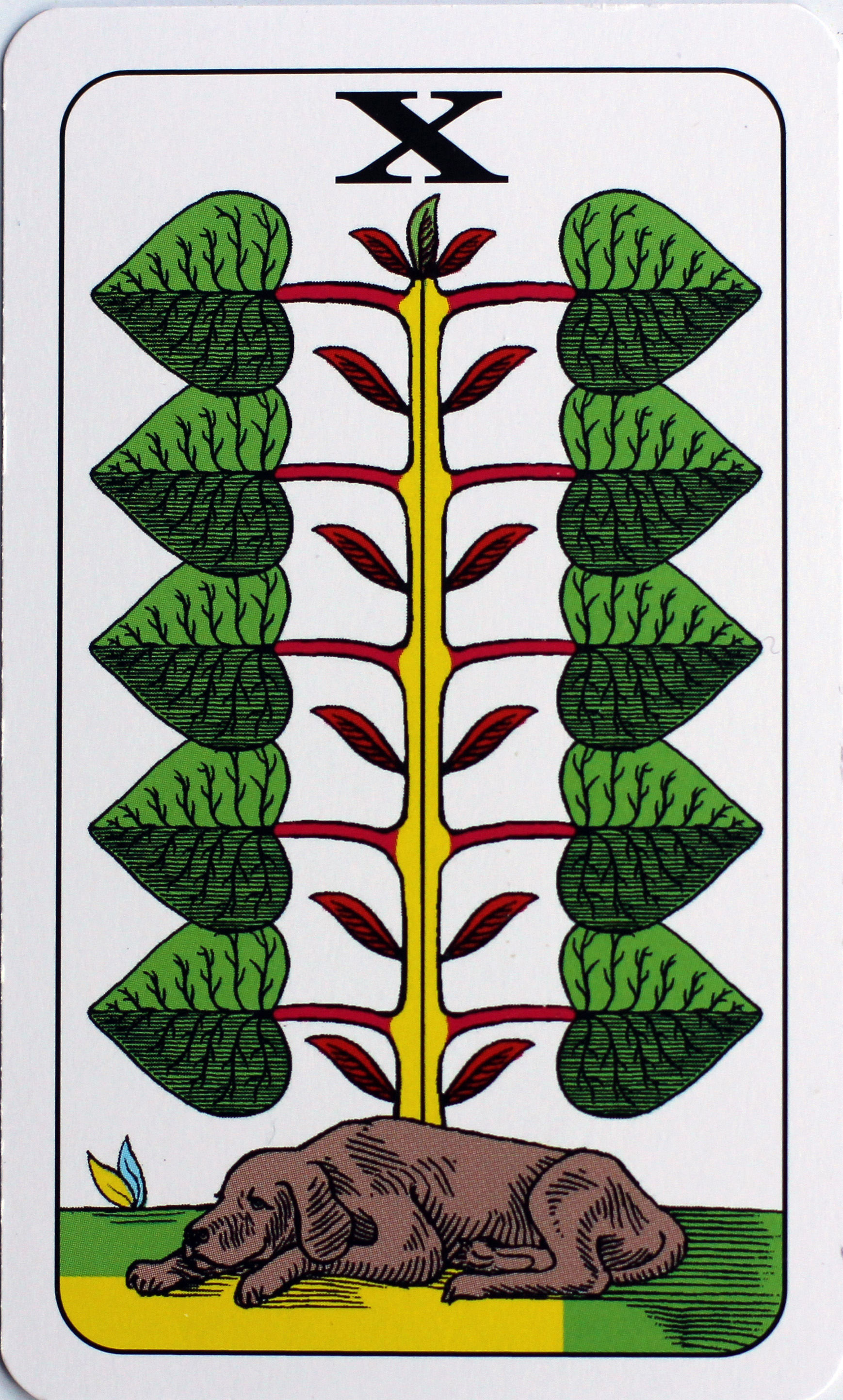
10 of Leaves (Laub-Zehn)

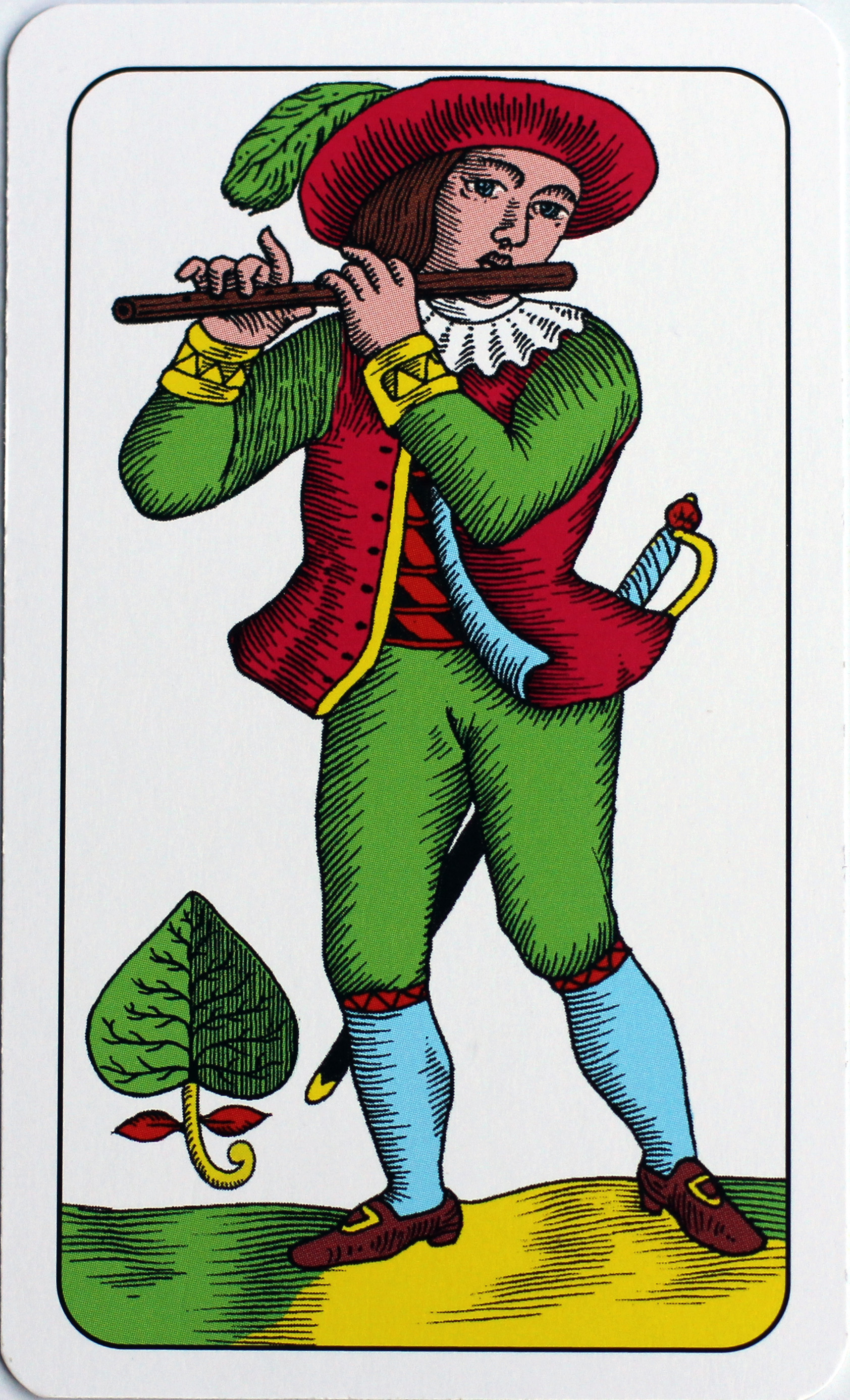
Unter of Leaves (Laub-Unter)

The 10 of Leaves can only be beaten by the Unter of Leaves

Trick with honour cards
(French pack)

10 of Spades (Pik-Zehn)

Jack of Spades (Pik-Bube)

The 10 of Spades can only be beaten by a Jack of Spades

Bohemian Schneider is played with a German deck of 32 cards (Skat deck). The cards rank as follows: Deuce (~Ace) > King > Ober > Unter > Ten > Nine > Eight > Seven. Alternatively a 32-card French or Piquet deck may be used.

=== Playing ===
After the cards have been shuffled each player is dealt six cards in two packets of three cards. The remaining cards are placed face down on the table to form the talon.

The opponent of the dealer begins the game and leads a cards to the table. The dealer now tries to win the trick, by playing the next higher card of the same suit. The card value in descending order is either Deuce, King, Ober and Unter in a German deck, or Ace, King, Queen and Jack in a French deck, followed in each case by the pip cards 10, 9, 8 and 7. There are no trump cards. The player who wins the trick, leads to the next trick. There is no requirement to follow suit and there is no obligation to win a trick even if the player could.

The winner takes the trick and then each player draws a card from the talon, the winner first. Then the next hand is played. The game continues until all the cards are used up.

=== Scoring ===
After all the cards have been played, the tricks are scored. However, it is not the card points (Augen) which are counted, but the number of 'honours' i.e. court cards, Aces and 10s. So the cards that count are: the Deuce/Ace, King, Ober/Queen, Unter/Jack and 10. In all there are 20 honours in the game. A player who wins 11–15 of these cards has a 'simple' or 'single' win. A player who takes 16–19 honours makes the opponent Schneider and wins double. If the opponent has no honours at all (i.e. is Schwarz) and the winner has 20, it is a triple win.

The scores are recorded and totted up after a predetermined time or number of hands.

== Strategy ==
Because each card can only be beaten by one other card, it is strategically important that players note the cards that have been played and especially the honours. Playing a card is safe if the higher card needed to beat it has already been played or is in the player's own hand. At the same time the player following to the trick should only discard such cards that cannot win a trick because the lower card has already been played or is in the player's hand.

The alternating of dealer with each game ensures that the advantage of going first changes with each game.

== Variations ==
1. A card may be beaten by any higher card. However, in this case, the players must always follow suit if they hold a card of the same suit in their hand. If they are unable to follow suit, they must discard a card of their choice.
2. Alternatively, players may allow a card to be beaten by the next higher ranking card of any suit.
3. An Ace may be beaten by the Seven of the same suit.
4. All counting cards score 1 point each. Scoring 11-15 earns 1 game point, 16–19, 2 game points and all 20 counters, 3 game points.

== Literature ==
- "Böhmischer Schneider" in Erhard Gorys: Das Buch der Spiele. Manfred Pawlak Verlagsgesellschaft, Herrsching o. J.; pp. 13–14.
- "Böhmischer Schneider" in Robert E. Lembke: Das große Haus- and Familienbuch der Spiele. Lingen Verlag, Cologne o. J.; p. 213.
- Steiner-Welz, Sonja (2007). Das Buch der Spiele and Rätsel von 1880 (in German). Reinhard Welz Vermittler Verlag e.K. p. 38. ISBN 9783937805238.
- von Thalberg, Baron F (1860). Der perfecte Kartenspieler oder practische Anleitung zur leichten Erlernung von 86 Kartenspiele (in German). Berlin: S Mode.
