= 304 (card game) =

Card game

304, pronounced three-nought-four, is a trick-taking card game popular in Sri Lanka, coastal Karnataka, Tamil Nadu and Maharashtra, in the Indian subcontinent. The game is played by two teams of two using a subset (7 through Ace of all suits) of the 52 standard playing cards so that there are 32 cards in play.

The game twenty-eight is thought to be descended from it.

== Rules ==
The cards are dealt by the dealer to all four players in a counter-clockwise manner (unlike most Anglo-American games in which deal and play are clockwise), each getting four cards in the first round. Eldest hand (right of the dealer) picks out a trump card from their hand and places it face down on the table. They then call a target score for their team, which they expect to be able to win judging by the cards in their own hand. A member of the opposing team has the opportunity to then pick their own trump, by calling a target score higher than the first player's. The rest of the cards are distributed and the game is started.

The game is played as a trick-taker, where the players follow the suit led. If they do not have the led suit, then they can try to guess the trump by passing a face down card to the player who has closed a trump card. If they guess it correctly then they get the trick; otherwise the game goes on.

Points are scored according to the points shown in the table. After all the hands are completed, if the team has scored the required score they win.

Card Values
Card	Points	Alternative Scoring
J	30	3.0
9	20	2.0
A	11	1.1
10	10	1.0
K	3	0.3
Q	2	0.2
8	0	0
7	0	0

Depending on which version of the game is played, the total number of points in the whole set of cards is either 304 or 30.4, hence the name of the game.

== Variations ==
=== Maharashtrian version ===
In this version, the concept of "marriages" is introduced, which consists of a K and a Q of the same suit. After the first hand won by any party, partner possessing the marriage must show it to all. Trump marriage carry 40 points whereas non trump marriage carries twenty points. If the bidding group shows the marriage, their bidding gets reduced by that many points. If shown by opponents, bidding is increased by that many points.

Last and 10: The team that wins the last hand steal 10 points from the opposition. This trick count towards making or breaking of the bid.

The cards: All cards 7 through A of all the suits are used in the game, and the hierarchy is unique to the game. It runs as J, 9, A, 10, K, Q, 8, 7. The points are same as those in the alternative version as given in the table above.

The deal: The dealing begins with four cards being distributed to each of the four players. Then each player looks at their cards and decides if they wish to call a Half-Court. A half-court is deemed to be made if the bidder collects all four tricks. A player is permitted to call for a partner, typically a high card of a suit the caller is weak in. In a half-coat the caller plays first on all four tricks and the other players follow. If the caller and their partner make all four tricks, that team are deemed to have won.

However a half-court is a relatively rare occurrence and is discussed in further detail later on. If no one wishes to call for a half-court, then the dealer deals out the remaining cards.

The bid: Once all the cards have been dealt, the bidding begins. Starting from the player to the left of the bidder, bidding continues in a clockwise manner. A player may bid anything from 160 through 304, the maximum points that can be made in a game. A minimum bid of 160 is required, because bets must be a multiple of 10 and over half the points to lay trump. If a player feels they can make all 304 points, they may call for a Full-Court, which is discussed later.

On their turn to bid a player may either raise the current bid or pass. Once a player passes they cannot bid further in the game. A player wins the bid when all others have passed, becoming the bidder and choosing a trump. The player also calls for a partner by naming a particular card and the holder of the card becomes their partner.

The trump: The trump is literally the bidder's trump card, trump cards in this case. A trick which is cut by a trump is won by the player of the biggest trump. For example, assume spades are played: P1 drops a J, P2 an 8 and P3 a 9. If P4 does not have spades, and he wishes to win the trick (considering that it is worth 50 points, it is a heavy trick and it is advisable to cut unless it is his partner's jack)

=== Tamil Nadu version ===
While similar in most respects to the version described above, the variation to this game accommodates six or eight players instead of the normal four. In case of six players, "3" is inducted as the card with the maximum points - 50, while J, 9, A, etc. retain the same values. The game then becomes 504, instead of 304. Similarly, if 8 players are in a game, "2" is also inducted into the game with a value of 100. Hence, the game becomes 904. In all cases, the number of teams remains at two and players from opposite teams sit next to each other to form a circle.

Also, in the standard four player version of the game, if a team has taken the first five tricks, at the time of leading the sixth trick, the player can say that they will "double", thereby challenging the opponents by saying that their team will take all eight tricks. Should the team succeed in taking all eight tricks, the successful team gets an extra point and should they fail, they lose an extra point. This option can be resorted to only if the player from the team that has taken the first five tricks is going to lead the sixth trick.

The Sri Lankan version is further complicated because since a player can plan out the "moves", as in a game of chess, the player knows at some point in the game what the outcome of the game would be irrespective of whoever throws whatever cards. Then, when all the 32 cards are going to be won by a single team, in that circumstance also one of the players of the team realises, faster than the other, that their team is going to win all 32 cards. A player should exactly identify this position, and as soon as it is reached, the player should call "Caps" and put their remaining cards on the table in the perfect order, meaning that whoever plays whatever cards, the player would throw the cards in the same order, indicated by the placement of the cards on the table by the player, and the player's team will collect all the cards.

In the six-players version, only six players participate with opposite team members sitting alternately, thus having three players in each of the two teams. Only the cards 9 through Ace from each suit are used, and when dealing, three cards are dealt per player before the bid and one card per player after the Bid, so that each player gets four cards. Since only six players participate, the bid is usually 200 upwards out of 304.

Sometimes no player would want to bid, as their hand is not good. In this case, the first player to receive cards, that is, the player who is immediately next to the dealer, is obliged to bid at the lowest bid allowed, which is usually 200.

This version also allows four players to play, in which case four cards are dealt before the bid, and two cards are dealt after the bid, per player. It can be extended to include eight players also, in which case the cards 7 and 8 from each suit are introduced. Three cards are dealt before and one card after the bid, per player.

In order to make the 304 less competitive, a different set of rules are followed when playing 304. For example, the person who covers the card is free to open that card whenever he wishes. He can either start a round with the closed card or if another person plays the trump group unknowingly, and if the person who covered the card (the caller) wishes to play the covered card, he can do so by playing the card in open thereby exposing the trump. Another instance where it complicates the game to increase competitiveness if someone except the caller plays a trump group card, not knowing that it's the trump, may be replied to by the caller (if they don't have the trump group in their hand) either by letting the hand pass, by covering a non trump card or by opening the card that was covered in the beginning. Furthermore, the counting method is varied giving A's and 10 the same value(10) to make counting easier. Sometimes a minimum bidding value is established (generally 160) and every twenty points the number of cards given to the winning team is increased by one until the maximum give out reach four cards.

However, since 304 is not a regulated game, the rules and regulations varies mainly according to common uses rather than a set of established rules. The variations are based on local needs to either complicate the game or simplify and present a great challenge to the players and think in a strategic manner to make the game more interesting. Rules and regulations are there to form a basis to build a foundation and players are free to find new methods to make the game competitive.

=== 532 (Card Game) ===
532, pronounced five-three-two, is a trick-taking card game for three players. It is popular in Maharashtra, South India and Sri Lanka.

==== Basics ====
The game is played with a subset of the 52 standard playing cards, ranking A K Q J 10 9 8 7. This is the order of the cards value, being Ace high and 7 low. The other cards, called "point cards" are generally used to keep track of points. The point cards are distributed to all the three players with ten or twenty points. Suit must be followed. For example, if we allow 10 points to each player before the game begins, then the cards of value 5, 3 and 2 of a particular suit is given to each player. The rest of the point cards are generally discarded or kept aside.

==== Dealing ====
The dealer shuffles the cards and the player to their left cuts the deck by giving a single shuffle to the cards. This is done to prevent any cheats by the dealer while shuffling. The dealer then deals five cards to each player in counter-clockwise motion, stacking the rest of the pack face down to the table. The shuffling rules as well as whether to deal in clockwise or counter-clockwise can be changed as per the players interests.

The dealer first deals five cards to each player. The first player (trump caller) will look at their 5 cards and place a suit as trump. They keep it aside and hidden from others. The dealer then deals five more to each in batches of 3s and 2s. The dealer will have two cards in his hand, called "sand cards", and these will be dealt face up to the middle of the table. Usually, the trump caller will exchange these cards for two cards which they do not need. Although they can exchange cards of any suit, they would usually not need low value cards of non-trump suit. At the same time, they would not want others to guess the trump.

==== Play ====
The trump caller must collect five tricks, the dealer must collect two and the other player three, there being ten tricks in each round. The trump caller must lay down the first card to the table and the next player a card of the same suit of the last player. The player who completes the sequence will collect the trick. The trump caller cannot lay down the trump suit.

If a player is run out of the suit that is currently being played upon, they can lay down a card of a particular suit and can ask the trump caller whether the suit of the card that they just dealt is a trump. If it is a trump, then the trump caller must show the trump card to all the players and should keep them along with their other cards. Since the trump has an upper edge, this player who laid down the trump suit would get the trick irrespective of what the others had laid down. On the other hand, if the card is not a trump, he would simply nod and the game would progress in a normal way.

At any stage of the game if any player lays down a card of a particular suit that is not there with the other two players, the other players can take the trick by placing the card of the same suit as that of the trump and the player who had placed the highest value trump suit would take the trick.

At the end of the game, the player who takes more tricks than their must tricks receives points (money) for each extra earned tricks from the player who failed to take their own tricks.

==== Sand cards (Variation) ====
Sand cards, also called Full Caught can also play a special role in the game if needed. The other two players than the trump caller can challenge to take all ten tricks if they play with a new trump. They can also use the sand cards by disposing two cards which they do not need. The points for the full caught is systemed as if the player who asked the full caught wins, he will receive the points from the others for their "must take" tricks, or if he loses, he will give them the same amount.

==== Scoring ====
Each player will be given ten or twenty points in the beginning; the game lasts until a player loses all of their points. If a player loses all their points, the player with the most points will be declared winner. The player with the next higher point will be declared a runner-up.

== See also ==
- 3-5-8
