= Bisca (card game) =

Portuguese card game

- Origin: Portugal
- Type: Trick taking
- Players: 2 or 4
- Skills: Tactics, Memory
- Cards: 40 cards
- Deck: French
- Rank (high→low): A 7 K J Q 6 5 4 3 2
- Play: Anticlockwise
- Playing time: 15 min
- Chance: Low-Moderate

Related games
- Briscola, Sueca

Bisca (a Portuguese version of the Italian game Bríscola) is a card game based on the Italian (40 card) deck.

== The Game ==
=== Players & deck ===
The game is normally played by either 2 players, or 4 players playing either as individuals or in partner pairs. It is played with the common 52-card French deck, but with the 8's, 9's, and 10's of each suit removed, creating the 40 cards required to play. The main objective of the game is to accumulate more points than the opponent, based on the cards that are captured and forfeited. It uses the Ace with value of 11 points and the seven (called the "bisca", "manilha" or "seta") with a value of 10 points, the King worth 4 points, Jack worth 3 points, and the Queen worth 2 points. (In the Italian/Spanish-to-French deck equivalents, the Jack out-ranks the Queen because its picture card is most similar to the Knight, whereas the Queen is matched to the Knave - originally the old Portuguese sotas, that were always female.)

=== The deal ===
The game is played counterclockwise.

The first dealer is chosen at random (or by draw of the highest card) and the turn to deal passes to the right after each hand. The dealer shuffles the cards and the player at the dealer's left cuts. The dealer then gives 3 cards to each player, one card at a time, beginning with the player to dealer's right, going around anticlockwise and ending with the dealer. The next card is then turned face up, and its suit becomes trumps (called "trunfo"). It is then placed at the bottom of the deck, partially visible.

=== The play ===
The player who cut the deck begins by placing a card from the three received in the deal. The opponent then places one of his cards, which will determine whether he captures or forfeits the cards on the table, based on the following precedence:

- If the cards are the same suit, the highest value card (or the highest face number on non-value cards) wins;
- If the cards are of different suits and there is no "trump card" among them, then the highest of the same suit of the first card played wins;
- If the cards are of different suits and there is a "trump card" among them, who played the highest trump card wins;

Captured cards are placed face down near the player who won them for later score counting - these cards are not played again in that deal.

After the play each player (with two cards left) takes a new card from the top of the deck (first the player who won the cards from the table, then anticlockwise) and this is repeated until you finish the cards in the deck.

The player who won the round then plays the first card of the next round.

At the end of the game, the captured cards values are counted up by adding their point values. Since the maximum score is 120 points, a player who accumulate 60 or more points before the game ends is already the winner and earn 1 set point in the game.

Bisca can also be played in pairs, where each player is facing/opposite their partner.

=== Scoring ===
In Bisca, the goal is to win tricks containing valuable cards. The card values are:

Card	Name / Value
	Ace ("Ás"); 11 Points
	Seven ("Sete", a.k.a. "Bisca"); 10 Points
	King ("Rei"); 4 Points
	Jack ("Valete"); 3 Points
	Queen ("Dama"); 2 Points
	The rest of the cards ("A palha"); 0 Points

== Variations ==
There are several variants of the rules:

- The standard game, also known as "Bisca dos Tres" (literal translation: "Bisca of Three", idiomatic translation: "Three's Bisca"), is played with each player being dealt 3 cards.
- "Bisca dos Sete" ("Seven's Bisca") is played with each player being dealt 7 cards.
- "Bisca dos Nove" ("Nine's Bisca") with each player being dealt 9 cards.
- Three player Bisca is played the same as the two player version, but the deck is reduced to 39 cards by taking away a 2.
- Six or eight player Bisca is also possible with two decks, making up 80 cards.
- Simplified variants:
  - In Anglo-French communities, the Queen-Jack rank reversal is often seen as confusing, and thus played with the Queen valued at 3 points, and the Jack valued at 2 points. Card ranking then becomes: A 7 K Q J 6 5 4 3 2
  - The 7 card can also be replaced by the 10 card to aid younger players. Card ranking then becomes: A 10 K J Q 6 5 4 3 2

=== Sueca ===
The 4 player partnerships version, with 10 cards dealt for each player, is also known as Sueca.

== See also ==
- Briscola
- Sueca
