= Bourré =

Gambling card game

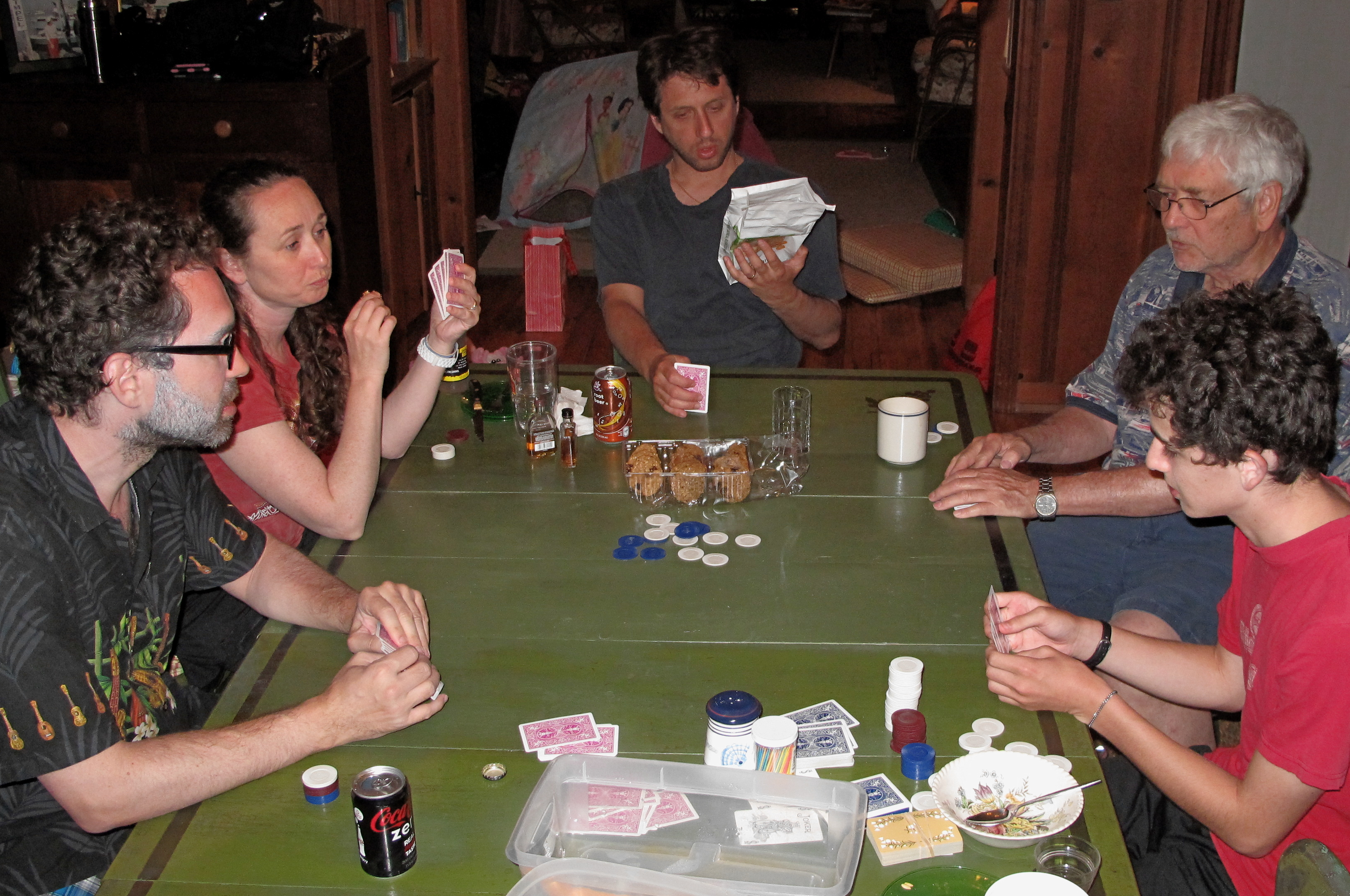
A group playing Bourré in Delaware

Bourré (French pronunciation: [buʁe]; also commonly spelled Bouré or phonetically as Boo-Ray) is a trick-taking gambling card game in the rams family, primarily played in the Acadiana region of Louisiana in the United States of America. It is also played in the Greek island of Psara, with the name Boureki (Μπουρέκι in Greek). Like many regional games, Bourré sports many variant rules for both play and betting considerations.

== Object ==
The object of Bourré is to take a majority of the tricks in each hand and thereby claim the money in the pot. If a player cannot take a majority of tricks, the secondary goal is to keep from going bourré, or taking no tricks at all. A bourré usually comes at a high penalty, including matching the amount of money in the pot.

== Rules ==
The game is played with a standard 52-card deck, aces high and two to seven players. With seven players, only three cards may be discarded (so as to not have to re-use them for later players). After every player antes, the dealer passes out five cards to each player, one at a time. In a traditional game, the dealer flips their own fifth card – the last dealt – and that card's suit is considered trumps (in Boureki kozia or atoy). As in Spades, the chosen suit beats all others; a two of trumps beats an ace of any other suit.

After the deal, each player, starting to the dealer's left and continuing clockwise, states an intent to play. Many variants require an additional ante at this point. Those who are not playing in the hand fold, and their cards are collected by the dealer.

Once every player has stated intent, the dealer asks those still in the game, in the same order as before, how many new cards they want. They can take any number from none to five, discarding an equal number from their original hand; their discards go in a separate pile and the dealer hands them their new cards. If the main stock is finished before all players have been serviced, the dealer shuffles the "folded" hands and deals those; if that stock is finished, the discards are shuffled and used.

Once everyone, including the dealer, has either folded or completed their redraw, the trick-taking phase begins. The first player to the dealer's left who is still in the game starts by playing any card (with few exceptions); rules of play are as follows:

1. You must play on-suit if possible, even if your highest on-suit card will not beat the highest card in play. Even if a trump has been played on a non-trump lead,
2. You must play a trump if you have no on-suit cards, and
3. You must "play to win". For example, if the only trump played is a three and you hold the two and ace of trumps but no cards of the lead suit, you must play the ace of trumps. There are two variants of this rule. Most commonly, if you cannot "play to win" then it is not required to play a trump card that cannot possibly win the trick. Alternatively, some variants require a trump card to be played regardless, even if it cannot win the trick.
4. If you have neither cards of the lead suit nor trumps, you may play any card from your hand. This is an off card and is effectively lower than a two of the lead suit.

The winner of a given round or trick collects the cards and places them face-up in front of them, then leads with another card. Play proceeds until all five tricks have been completed.

- If a single player has taken more tricks than any other player, that player has won the hand and may take all of the winnings in the pot.
- If more than one player ties for the most tricks, this is a split pot. With five tricks, the only possible splits are 2-2-1 and 1-1-1-1-1. On a split pot, the winnings stay on the table. Players tied for first do not have to pay into the pot to ante for the next round.
- Any player who took no tricks or reneged during play— that is, did not follow the rules properly—has gone bourré and must match the pot for the next round instead of adding the usual ante. For example, if there are five red chips in the pot at the end of a hand, any player who has gone bourré must put five red chips (or their equivalent) into the pot for the next round. Matching the pot is required at the end of a round regardless of whether the player continues to the next round.

Deal then passes to the left.

There are complex rules about forced plays; a simple example is when someone who has just taken their second trick holds the ace of trumps. Since the ace of trumps is unbeatable, they must play it as their next card. Similar occurrences are when a player has taken one trick and has both ace and king or (more complex) ace, queen and jack. This is sometimes called the "cinch win" rule. If it is a "cinch" that you will win, you must win immediately by laying down the winning cards all at once. While the rules themselves are simple in theory, details about forced plays can make Bourré challenging for even a skilled player.

The "must play to win" rule can have contentious results if a player is playing "nice", trying to keep others from going bourré. Most games disallow such "nice" plays; players must attempt to bourré as many other players as possible. As Bourré is a game with imperfect information and gamesmanship is expected to trump rules-lawyering, care should be applied to any analysis of rounds when looking for such "nice" plays.

== Variations ==
Variations in rules of Bourré abound, possibly due to its nature as a regional game. Perhaps most common is the introduction of a pot limit, which caps the total amount a single bourré or renege can cost a given player. In some games, it is common for the dealer to ante for all of the players; this simplifies trying to determine whether individuals have anteed. In a sense, the dealer is paying for his face-up trump. In this variation, for a five-person, one-dollar-ante game, the dealer of each hand would ante five dollars.

A common point of dissent is whether a player who holds trumps but not the lead suit should be forced to play a trump if he cannot beat a higher trump already on the table; while consensus seems to be that the "play to win" rule applies, groups of players are known to require a player to play trump even though the player cannot possibly win the trick. Punishments for misplay range from simple retraction (good for new players), retraction-and-renege, or just a renege, which can lead to the misplaying individual attempting to bourré one or more other players. The default ante amount is understandably variable and the second ante is fairly common.

Another way of putting this is to ask if a player is allowed to "slough", that is, when the player cannot follow suit, to play a non-trump to preserve a low trump or to void a suit? This is kind of like the sometimes prohibition against "sandbagging" - is a player allowed to check, then raise in the same round? For friendly games, the answer to both these questions is "yes".

== In the news ==
A game of Bourré apparently sparked the dispute that led to NBA star Gilbert Arenas's suspension. During an overnight flight from Phoenix to Washington, DC, on December 19, 2009, Arenas needled teammate Javaris Crittenton for losing over $1,000 in a game of Bourré. The two exchanged words, with Arenas joking that he would blow up Crittenton's car and Crittenton saying he would shoot Arenas in his surgically repaired knee. Two days later Arenas brought four guns to the Washington Wizards' locker room and left them, with a sign saying "Pick One," at Crittenton's locker. The incident, combined with Arenas's trivialization of it in the media, led to his suspension from the NBA on January 6, 2010. A game of Bourré also sparked a fight on the Memphis Grizzlies' team plane between NBA teammates OJ Mayo and Tony Allen in January 2011, when Mayo refused to settle a debt from a game.

== Resources ==
- Guidry, Preston (1988). Graeff, Benny; Lantier, Ivy (eds.). Official Rules and Techniques of the Cajun Card Game Bourré (boo-ray). Louisiana: National Cajun Bourré Association.
- Engler, Henry J (1964). Rules and Techniques of Bourré.
- McNamara, Dave (14 December 2022). "Bourre' card game - A Good Cajun Bet". The Heart of Louisiana.
- "Bourré (Booray)". Pagat. 29 December 2010.
- "Bourre, Booray, Rules of Card Games". White Knuckle Cards.
- "Open Source Java Implementation of Bourré"
