= Twenty-eight (card game) =

Indian card game

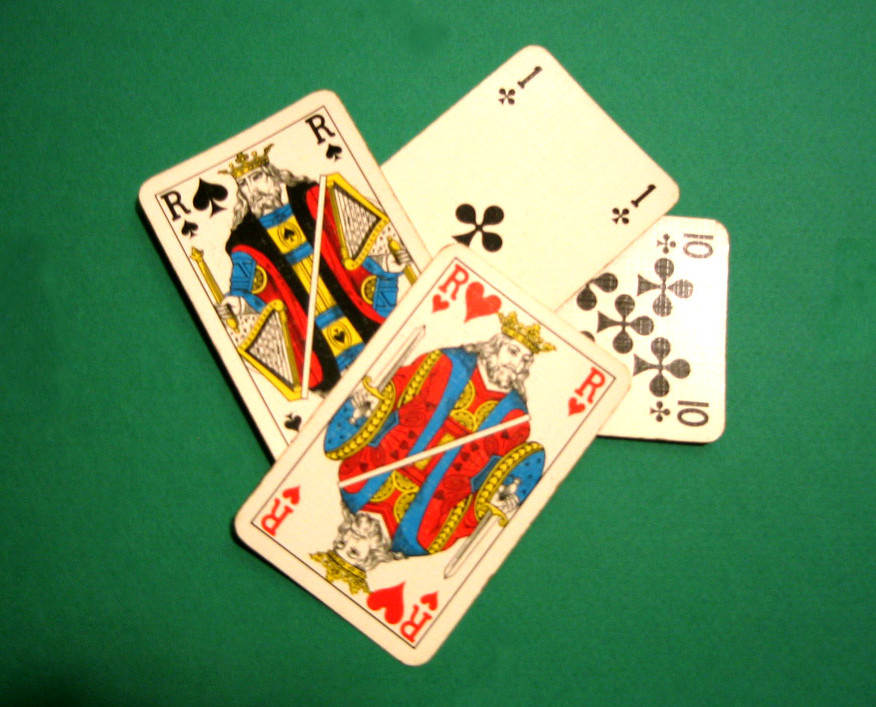
- Origin: India
- Named variant: Twenty-nine; Forty
- Type: Trick-taking
- Players: 2, 3, 4, 6
- Skills: Memory, Tactics
- Cards: 32
- Deck: French
- Rank (high→low): J 9 A 10 K Q 8 7
- Play: Counter-clockwise
- Playing time: ~5 minutes per game
- Chance: Medium

Related games
- Jass, Klaverjas

Twenty-eight is an Indian trick-taking card game for four players, in which the Jack and the nine are the highest cards in every suit, followed by ace and ten. It thought to be descended from the game 304, along with similar Indian games known as "29", "40" and "56". It was first played in Dharbhanga and to be founded by Syed Anwar Kamal.

== Overview ==
Twenty-eight originated in India. The game is believed to be related to the European family of Jass card games, which originated in the Netherlands. These games are believed to have been brought to India by Indian South Africans who were also influenced by the Afrikaner game of Klaverjas.

Twenty-eight is a very popular game in the state of Bihar. Some believe that the game originated in the Lakhisarai district of Bihar. The game is also very popular in South India, particularly in the state of Kerala where it is known as Irupathiyettu (Malayalam: ഇരുപത്തിയെട്ട് which translates to 'twenty-eight') or Thuruppu (Malayalam: തുറുപ് Trump). Twenty-nine is a variation of the game that is popular in North India and Bangladesh. Both games are also related to 304, a card game popular in Sri Lanka and Nepal.

== Players and cards ==
28 is usually played by four players in fixed partnerships, partners facing each other. 32 cards from a standard 52-card pack are used for play. There are eight cards in each of the usual "French" suits: hearts, diamonds, clubs and spades. The cards in every suit rank from high to low: J-9-A-10-K-Q-8-7. The aim of the game is to win tricks containing valuable cards.

The total number of points in the deck is 28, hence the name of the game. The values of the cards are:

- Jacks = 3 points each
- Nines = 2 points each
- Aces = 1 point each
- Tens = 1 point each
- Other cards = (K, Q, 8, 7) no points

== Deal and bidding ==
Deal and play are counter-clockwise; the cards are shuffled by the player who is in the left. Four cards are then dealt to each player.

Based on these four cards, players bid for the right to choose trump. Each bid is a number, and the highest bidder undertakes that their side will win in tricks at least the number of points bid. The player to dealer's right speaks first, and must bid at least 14. Subsequent players, in counter-clockwise order, may either bid higher or pass. The auction continues once until the player passes and the bid moves on to the next player.

The highest bidder chooses a trump suit on the basis of their four cards, and places a card of this suit face down. The card is not shown to the other players, who therefore will not know at first what suit is trump: it remains face down in front of the bidder until at some point during the play someone calls for the trump suit to be exposed.

The dealer then completes the deal, giving four more cards to each player, so that everyone has eight.

== Gameplay ==
The play can be divided into two phases: before and after the bidder's face down trump card (also known as 'turup') is exposed.

=== First phase ===
Deal and play are anti-clockwise; the cards are shuffled by the dealer and cut by the player to dealer's left. The cards are shuffled only a few times. Four cards are then dealt to each player.

Based on these four cards, players bid for the right to choose trump. Each bid is a number, and the highest bidder undertakes that their side will win in tricks at least the number of points bid. The player to dealer's right speaks first, and subsequent players, in anticlockwise order, may either bid higher or pass. The minimum bid allowed is 14 and the maximum is 28 (assuming that the point for the last trick is not counted; for 29, bidding starts with 17). If any player bids, the auction continues for as many rounds as necessary until three players pass in succession. The player to dealer's right must bid at least the minimum.

The final bidder chooses a trump suit and to indicate the chosen suit, places a card of the chosen suit face down on the table, and does not show this card to the other players.

The dealer then completes the deal, giving four more cards to each player, so that everyone has eight.

The player to the dealer's right leads to the first trick; players must follow suit if possible, the highest card of the suit lead wins the trick, and the winner of each trick leads to the next. The card with no points always loses to the card with points(all jacks, nines, tens and aces) and if all cards led have no points, the card with the higher number wins. During this first phase it is illegal for the bidder to lead a card of the trump suit, unless he or she has no cards of other suits or if another player has already led a card of the trump suit. If you have no card of the suit led, you have two options:

You may discard any card. This card cannot win the trick. Before playing a card, you may call for the bidder's face down trump to be exposed. In this case, the bidder must turn this trump card face up for all to see, and it is then added to the bidder's hand. Having called for the trump to be exposed, you must play a trump to this trick if you have one; if you have no trump you may discard any card. The play now enters the second phase. During the first phase, the face down trump card is not considered as belonging to the bidder's hand. If the bidder holds no card of the suit that was led, the bidder has essentially the same options as the other players: to discard any card without declaring trump, or to expose the face down trump card and play a trump card to the trick which was face down.

During the first phase, cards of the (concealed) trump suit have no special effect: each trick is won by the highest card of the suit led, even if it also contains cards of the suit that is subsequently revealed as trump.

=== Second phase ===
Beginning with the trick in which trump is exposed, each trick is won by the highest trump card in it. Tricks that contain no trump cards are won by the highest card of the suit led. Players must follow suit if possible: if unable to follow, they may play a trump card or discard a card of another suit, as they like. As before, the winner of each trick leads to the next. The bidder is now free to lead any suit, including trump.

If a player trumps a hand and the next player does not have the suit that was played first, then either he has to over trump the hand or play other suit but cannot play a lower trump card.

Note that if a situation is reached during the first phase in which the bidder has no trump cards in hand, and another player leads the trump suit, the bidder can play any card, since the face down trump card is not yet part of the bidder's hand. Of course the bidder has the option to expose the face down trump card and play it, but if the face down trump card is low and cannot win the trick, it will probably be better to save it for later. If no one calls for trump to be exposed during the first seven tricks, the game stands invalid.

=== Scoring for a round ===
When all eight tricks have been played, each side counts the card points in the tricks it has won. The bidding team needs at least as many card points as the bid to win; otherwise they lose, adjusted for a declaration of a Pair if appropriate, they win one game point; otherwise they lose one game point. The score of the team playing against the bidder does not change.

Each side keeps score using a red Six (known as nali or red chaka) and a black Six (known as kala or black chaka), from the cards not used in the game. These are arranged to display either a number of red pips, representing a positive score, or a number of black pips, for a negative score. At the start of the game no pips are showing. If the bidding side wins, they expose one extra red pip or (if they had black pips showing) cover one black pip; if they lose they expose a black pip or cover a red pip.

Many play that if the bidder scores less than half of the call this doubles the number of game points they lose. The player has no rights to shuffle the card on the first round of the bid. Shuffling card means losing the game, he may only cut once without touching the pack. If the player calls half-court, only three rather than the customary six cards are played. If the caller wins all three rounds, the other player forfeits two cards hh;;

=== Keeping team score ===
Some play that after the bidder has chosen trump or asked for the 'seventh card', but before the dealer continues the deal, either opponent of the bidder may say 'double' if he or she believes that the bidder's team will fail. Also the bidder's team have to say 'redouble' at that moment without seeing another cards. The bidder's team will then win two game points rather than one if they succeed and lose two game points if they fail.

Some play that after a double, the bidder or the bidder's partner can reply with a 'redouble', which doubles the score again to four game points won or lost.

Some give the whole pile of unused cards (2s to 5s of all suits) to the trump maker, who arranges them with a card on the bottom to indicate the trump suit - or the seventh card is placed under them if 'seventh card' was called. A double or redouble is indicated by flipping face up one or two cards respectively from the top of this pile. The identity of the flipped card has no effect on the game - it is just there to remind the players that the game has been doubled.

One variation exists in which the score for the game is increased to two game points whenever the bid is 21 or more. The bidding side exposes or covers two red or black pips rather than just one.

In this version, bids of 20 or less can be doubled by the opponents and redoubled by the bidding team as described above. Bids of 21 or more, which are already worth two game points, can be doubled by the bidder's opponents, raising their value to four points (this is treated as a redouble), but four game points are the limit: the value cannot be further increased by the bidding team. However this rule is implemented to speed up the game and to make it more enjoyable, but this rule is not a compulsion.

Also in some parts of India, especially in Odisha, Bihar and Jharkhand they also play in which you can bid six points in a single game. It's called a 'C', but this can only be implemented by the bidder if there is not a single pip displayed either black or red and the opponent has given a double. If you are playing an auto-double game version then also a 'C' cannot be implemented.

The game is won by the first team to reach a cumulative score of plus 6 game points, shown by six red pips for all the numbers 2-6. Each win or loss of six pips opens up a set. A red set if won and black if lost. It is best practice to drop a set if both team has same set open. It also ends if a team reaches minus 6 game points (six black pips) for all the numbers 2-6, thereby losing the game.

In Kerala this game is popularly known as Lelam.

== Miscellaneous rules ==
The game is cancelled if any of the following events occur:

1. If first hand for the first player who was dealt doesn't have a point, card can be reshuffle
2. If any player is dealt 8 cards that are worth 0 points.
3. if any player makes a mistake during the game, he forfeits the points he called in the start or the opposite player gains the points which they made at the start.
4. If the person next to the shuffler has point-less cards. Here's a catch if he chooses not to bid and the person next to him has again pointless cards then the game has to be cancelled.
5. Many think that the maximum point that can be played for is 28 or 29. But actually it is 32 and 33. Pair can be shown and points reduced to 28 or 29 as the case may be.

=== Pair rule ===
The pair rule increases or decreases the bid value by 4 points. Pair should be shown only when the trump card has been revealed and either party (bidder and opposition) takes a hand after the trump card has been shown, but you must take the hand using trump card before showing trump, i.e. you cannot show the pair and then take a hand with queen or king but rather you should take a hand with a different card and then show the pair. If the opposing team has the pair, then the bid value increases by 4 points. In some variations people also go for doubling or halving of the points depending on which person has the king/queen pair.

In West Bengal, a variant of 28 is played where the lowest score is 16 and maximum is 28. In this variation, for a bid of 16-18 points, the bidding team cannot show the pair. They must have bid at least 19 to show it. But if the bidding point is 19 the bid value will decrease by 3 points only and above it (20-28) the bid value will decrease by 4 points.

=== Single Hand ===
Some play that after all the cards have been dealt, but before the lead to the first trick, a player with very strong cards may declare a 'single hand', undertaking to win all eight tricks, playing alone. In this case there is no trump, the player who announced 'single hand' leads to the first trick, and the partner of the lone player places their hand face down and takes no part in the play. The lone player's team wins 3 game points if all eight tricks are won, and loses 3 points otherwise.

- If multiple players want to play 'Single Hand', the first player to declare 'single hand' will play 'Single Hand'.

If the bidder is with Single Hand Show will drop all cards undertaking to win all eight tricks. Moreover, there is catch where all the cards are from same suits: hearts, diamonds, clubs and spades, Its a "Single Hand Show" game wins 3 game points.

== Variants ==
=== Twenty Nine ===
29 is the most popular variant of twenty-eight. In this game, the winner of the last round gets an extra point hence the name. 29 is one of the most popular card games in the South Asia (especially in Bangladesh). The bidding starts from 16. You can show the pair of king and queen of the same colour of the trump, by doing this bidding is increased or decreased by 4 points depending on which team has shown the pair that is defender or bidding team. A variation popular among Indian South Africans is called Thunee (various spellings).

=== Forty ===
40 is another variation of these set of games, usually played in India. The game requires 6 players. In this game, cards '3' of each suite is added. These '3's carry the value of jacks, i.e., 3 points. Both 3 and Jack has the same value. The first player to play any of these will win the round, if every other rules are followed. Twenty is the minimum call, the bidder has to make. The point system is as follows.

- 20 to 29 - If the bidding team wins, they get 1 point and if they lose the opponents get 2 points.
- 30-33 - If the bidding team wins, they get 2 points and if they lose the opponents get 3 points.
- 34-40 - If the bidding team wins, they get 3 points and if they lose the opponents get 4 points.
- Thani/Single - If the bidding team wins, they get 4 points and if they lose the opponents get 5 points.

If any player wants to bid for a second time, he/she will have to bid for 30 or more. Another rule forbids the player next to the shuffler (the first bidder) to bid, if he/she has the cards of one suite only. If, however, a wrong game is played and the opponents find it out, the opponents will receive double the point which were due to them, if otherwise.

=== Fifty-Six ===
Popular in the Indian province of Kerala, 56 (or Ambathiyaaru) doubles the number of total points to be won, and is played with a double pack. It is usually played as a 6 player game, although variations of 4 and 8 players are possible.

=== Twenty Twenty ===
In this variant, every King and Queen carries a negative point bringing the total number of points down to 20 from 28 (-1 for each King and Queen in the suit)

=== Other rules ===
Some play that opponent can show the pair anytime after the trump is revealed and that bidder can show pair after the trump is revealed if they have taken hand before the trump was revealed.

Another variant is that Jacks can be passed at any time, by anybody.

Some play that auto-double is allowed at 20, 21, 22 and so on, and that C can be played for 6 points if the point is 0 for the bidding team and opposition has given double or worse if it is an auto-double.
