= Sergeant major (card game) =

British military card game

3-5-8, also known as sergeant major, is a game originated in the Royal Engineers. It is a trick-taking card game for 3 players, based on whist, using a standard 52 card deck. 3-5-8 may be played as a gambling game, and there are many variations with names like "8-5-3" and "9-5-2" played throughout the world.

== Preliminaries ==
Three players use a 52-card deck. The object is to win as many tricks as possible, ultimately 12 in a single deal to win the game. When a player wins 12 or more tricks in one hand, they win the game.

=== First deal and exchange ===
Draw cards to determine the first dealer and deal 16 cards to each player, the 4 remaining cards are placed on the table to form a kitty. Dealer names a suit as trump and discards 4 cards from their hand before replacing them with the kitty. Some groups allow the dealer to pick up the kitty and add it to their hand before discarding any 4 cards of the 20 they now have.

=== Play ===
Eldest hand leads any card to the first trick and play moves clockwise with each player following suit, or playing any card if unable to follow suit. Each trick is won by the highest trump, or by the highest card of the suit led if no trump card was played to the trick. The winner of each trick leads to the next.

=== Targets and scoring ===
Each player has a minimum number of tricks called a target. Targets are determined by each player's seat for that hand as follows:

- Eldest hand: 5
- Middle hand: 3
- Dealer: 8

After all 16 tricks have been played, scores and targets are compared and players who won more tricks than their target are up by the number of excess tricks, while players who fell short of their target are down by a number of tricks. If players are gambling, up players receive one stake per excess trick won, paid by down player who will have lost by the same number of tricks.

=== Subsequent deals and exchanges ===
Deal and targets are passed to the left and the new dealer deals the cards out as before, only now there is an exchange of cards before dealer names trump:

- Each player who was up on the previous hand gives one unwanted card per overtrick to a player who was down, and that player must return the highest card or cards that they hold of the same suit or suits. Aces are low and Kings are high. Players receiving cards in suits that they do not have or in a suit which they can not provide a higher card for, simply return those cards to the issuer instead of making an exchange. This is done without declaring any suits or revealing any cards.
- If two players were up, the player with the higher target for the hand about to be played, gets to exchange the cards first, and if they are to exchange cards with two players who were down, then they exchange with the player who has the lowest target first.
- After this exchange is complete, dealer names trumps, discards four cards and takes the kitty as before.
- If the dealer was down in the previous round and gave away the highest card of a suit, but then picks up one or more higher cards of that same suit, these high cards must be shown privately to players who traded cards in that suit.

Play and scoring continues as above. As the game proceeds, a players target moves up, i.e., 3, 5 then 8 and back to three and so on.

== Variations ==
=== Optional 3-5-8 rules ===
Any of the following rules may be incorporated in a normal game of 3-5-8:

- Dealer picks up the kitty and then discards instead of discarding before picking up.
- Game goes on until someone takes all sixteen tricks making for an extremely long game.
- Game proceeds until someone scores five more tricks than their target, rather than twelve tricks which only the dealer (target 8, who calls trumps) would otherwise be likely to win. This makes it easier for the eldest (target 5) or especially the middle (target 3) hands to win and end the game in any round, and slightly harder for the dealer. A common ending is the dealer managing to go "up" and then winning (going "out") next round on the middle hand.

==== Optional Woburn rules ====
Two optional rules were created to try to balance the game. These rules were used at Woburn Collegiate Institute in the early 90s.

- First round bidding: The dealer position is determined by the players bidding on the number of tricks they plan on getting if that player was the dealer. Bids must be at least eight tricks. Bidding starts with the dealer of the first hand and goes clockwise. Once all players have passed, the player who bid the highest becomes dealer for the first round and play continues as normal. If all players passed, then the hand is re-dealt with the deal being passed clockwise. To balance out the trick quota, the number of tricks that the other two positions need to get would be reduced as follows: 8-5-3, 9-4-3, 10-4-2, 11-3-2, 12-2-2, 13-2-1, 14-1-1, 15-1-0, 16-0-0.
- Maximum bleed: Card exchanges are limited to a maximum of three cards. Priority for starting the exchange went to the player who needed to collect more tricks, which is the same order that card exchanges are made. Once a player has exchanged three cards, no more cards are exchanged with that person. e.g. If the 8 position was +2 and the 5 position was +2, and the 3 position was - 4, then the 8 position would exchange two cards with the 3 position, and then the 5 position would only exchange one card. If there is more than one recipient of the exchange, the priority is reversed. e.g. If the 8 position was +4 and both the 5 and 3 positions were -2, then the 8 position would exchange one card with the 5 position and two cards with the 3 position.

=== Sergeant major alternate ===
Played as previously with 3-5-8 hands and a 4 card kitty.

- 8-hand (dealer) must win a minimum of 8 tricks
- 5-hand (eldest hand) must win a minimum of 5 tricks
- 3-hand (middle hand) must win a minimum of 3 tricks

Instead of swapping cards at the end of each round, a running total is kept. Anything over the minimum is a plus score and everything under the minimum is a minus score; 1 point per trick. If the 3-hand player wins 6 tricks then they have scored +3, and if the 5-hand player wins 4 tricks then they have scored -1.

The other change is that each player can only make one call of each type. The calls that the 8-hand player can make are:

- Hearts
- Clubs
- Diamonds
- Spades
- No trumps (NT)
- Miz

In a no trumps call, the trick is won by the highest-ranked card of the suit that was lead. So if 5♥ is played first followed by K♣ and then 10♥, the 10♥ wins.

A miz round is played as a no trumps round, but the aim is to lose tricks and the usual minimum needed to win instead becomes the maximum that may be won without losing points.

- 8-hand (dealer) may win a maximum of 3 tricks
- 5-hand (eldest hand) may win a maximum of 5 tricks
- 3-hand (middle hand) may win a maximum of 8 tricks

If a player wins under their maximum then this is a plus score and if they win over it is a minus score; 1 point per trick. So, if the 3-hand player wins 5 tricks, then the score is -2, if they win 1 trick then the score is +2. The 5-hand player is allowed to win 5 tricks without penalty, so if they have won 4 tricks then they have a score of +1.

The game is played until all three players have played all six calls that can be made.

=== 6-3-8 ===
6-3-8 is a good game for 3 people whose deck is one card short. It is played the same as 5-3-8 except for the following:

- Preliminaries: A card (usually 2♠, but any will do) is removed the pack and the game is played with only 51 cards.
- Deal: 17 cards to each player – There is no kitty.
- Targets: Eldest hand's target is 6 instead of 5. Other targets are the same.
- Scoring: Scores are kept on paper: +1 for each trick above target, -1 for each trick below.
- Game: Winner is the first person to reach +10 points.

=== 9-5-2 ===
A Canadian variant whose rules are the same as in 5-3-8 except for the following:

- The targets for the three players are:
  - Eldest hand: 5
  - Middle hand: 2
  - Dealer: 9
- After trading cards and choosing trump, the dealer picks up the four kitty cards before discarding four.
- Players' cumulative scores are recorded on paper as in 6-3-8 (above). Thus, the total score of all three players will always be zero.
- Game is played until one player has reached a predetermined score of either +10 or +20 points

==== 9-5-2 Variation ====
This variation of a variation plays 9-5-2 with the following changes:

- Eldest and middle hands' targets are switched so that each is trying to win the following number of tricks:
  - Eldest hand: 2
  - Middle hand: 5
  - Dealer: 9
- The order of exchanging cards and making trumps is:
1. Dealer picks up the four kitty cards and then discards four
2. Players with positive scores on the previous hand pass cards
3. Dealer names trump
4. Players with negative scores pass back their highest cards in the suits they were given
- The game continues until someone reaches or exceeds either +15 or -15. Whoever has the highest score at that time is the winner.

==== 9-5-3 variation using single card kitty ====
Play is as before with each aiming for 9, 5 and 3 respectively, except:

- All cards are dealt except for the one remaining card, which is placed face up on the table. This card is available to the player who holds the two of diamonds, and proceed by swapping if they wish to. If the card happens to be 2♦, no swap is possible.
- Play continues until one player wins 13 tricks with one hand, who is then declared the winner.

== See also ==
- 304 (card game)
