= Sueca (card game) =

Card game

- Origin: Portugal
- Type: Trick taking
- Players: 4
- Skills: Tactics
- Age range: 12+
- Cards: 40 cards
- Deck: French
- Rank (high→low): A 7 K J Q 6 5 4 3 2
- Play: Counter clockwise
- Playing time: 15 min
- Chance: Moderate-High

Related games
- Einwerfen

Sueca (meaning Swedish (female) in Portuguese) is a 4 player-partnership point trick-taking card game of the ace–ten family, and a popular variant of the Bisca card game. The game is played in Portugal, Brazil, Angola and other Portuguese communities. Its closest relative is the very similar German game Einwerfen.

== History ==
Very little is known about the origins of Sueca. The rules of the game are passed down generationally, but vary slightly from region to region in Portugal, its archipelagos of Madeira and Azores and its former colonial territories of Brazil, Angola and Mozambique. Its close similarities to Bisca, although played with partnerships optional and with 3-, 7- or 9-card dealt hands, is evidence of its assumed ancestor, the Italian game Briscola. Parlett notes that it is remarkably similar to the old German game of Einwerfen, an early member of the ace–ten family.

Sueca is a very popular card game in Portuguese communities and can be played socially, but is often played in taverns (“taberna”) or pubs (“tasca”) in informal betting (bets are made on winning sets of 4 games), or in officiated tournaments (“torneio”) - both professionally (cash prizes) and sometimes for arbitrary prizes like lamb, suckling pig, a rooster or a “bifana"

== The game ==
=== Players & deck ===
The game is normally played by 4 players. Players sitting across from each other form teams, which compete to take more points than the other team by winning tricks containing valuable cards. Sueca is played with 40 cards by removing 8s, 9s, and 10s, from a standard 52 card deck. The ranks of the cards, in order from highest to lowest, is: Ace, 7, King, Jack, Queen, 6, 5, 4, 3, 2 (alternatively, some people may replace the "7" for the "10" still equaling 10 points). The entire deck is distributed equally to the 4 players with the dealer, who turns up one of their cards after the dealing, sequentially rotated. Each player is required to follow suit, and can play a trump only when void in the lead suit. Whoever wins the trick leads the next.

The cards are valued based on their rank: The Ace is worth 11 points, the Seven 10, the King 4, the Jack 3, and the Queen 2. (In the Italian/Spanish-to-French deck equivalents, the Jack out-ranks the Queen because its picture card is most similar to the Knight (“Cavaleiro“), whereas the Queen (Lady / “Dama“) is matched to the Knave (“Valete“) - originally the old Portuguese sotas, that were always female.) With 120 points at stake in every hand, the first team of 2 to reach 61 points wins the hand. If a team reaches more than 91 points, it scores a double win (i.e. as if they had won two hands). If the team gets 30 points exactly then a triple win for the other team. The first team to reach four won hands wins the set, known in Portuguese as a "partida". Although rare, a team capturing all 120 points scores a set.

As well as the high position of the 7, known as "manilha" or "bisca" to Portuguese speaking players, notice that the jack beats the queen. This is very common in Portuguese card games, a resonance of the old Portuguese decks where the Jack was thought of as a knight and the queen corresponded to a maid (see Portuguese playing cards). Each suit sums to 30 points, thus 120 points are at stake in every playing round.

=== The deal ===
The game is played counter clockwise. (In Brazil the game is played clockwise.)

The first dealer is chosen at random and the turn to deal passes to the right after each hand. The player to the dealer's right shuffles the cards and the player at the dealer's left cuts. The dealer then gives 10 (ten) cards to each player, one at a time, beginning with the player to dealer's right, circling around counter clockwise (until each player has received ten cards) and ending with the dealer. The next card dealt from deck is turned face up, and its suit becomes trumps. (While the accepted norm of point cards able to be trump cards, some chose to redraw the trump until a non-point card is chosen.)

In the Brazilian variant the dealer gives 10 cards to each player, in a single batch, beginning with the player to dealer's left, going around clockwise and ending with the dealer. The bottom card of the deck, which belongs to the dealer, is turned face up, and its suit becomes trumps. Alternatively, the dealer can choose to deal the first ten cards to himself, the next ten to the player to his right, and so on counter-clockwise. In this case the dealer's first card (the top card of the deck after the cut) is turned up and determines the trump suit.

=== The play ===
The player to the right of the dealer (the one who shuffled the cards) leads to the first trick. Players must follow suit if they can. A player who has no card of the suit led may play any card. If any cards of the trump suit are played to a trick, the highest trump wins. Otherwise, the trick is won by the highest card of the suit led. The winner of each trick leads to the next.

Being considered a "deaf-dumb person's game" in Portugal, there can be no talking between the players and no exchange of signals between partners (considered cheating in tournament play). In casual play, though, this rule is frequently overridden, with signs actually being negotiated between partners prior to playing, which adds a different level of fun to the game –- as each team tries to discover the other's cheating signs so they can get the upper hand in play.

=== Scoring ===
In Sueca, the goal is to win tricks containing valuable cards. The card values are:

Card	Name / Value
	Ace ("Ás"); 11 Points
	Seven ("Manilha" / "Sete" / "Bisca"); 10 Points
	King ("Rei"); 4 Points
	Jack ("Valete"); 3 Points
	Queen ("Dama"); 2 Points
	The rest of the cards ("A palha"); 0 Points

There are altogether 120 points in the deck.

The object of the play is to win tricks containing more than half of the deck's points. The team which takes more than 60 points scores one game. The first team to score four games wins the set (called a "rubber").

If a team takes more than 90 points (91+) in one deal, then they score two games instead of one.

If they take all the tricks (all the cards in the deck), then they win the rubber immediately – this is known a "dar uma bandeira" (literal translation: "Give a flag", idiomatic translation: "Brush off" or "White wash"). Taking 120 points but losing a trick (with no counting cards in it) is not sufficient to win the rubber. In this case, the team is awarded a double win for having over 90 points.

In case of a tie, neither team wins any points.

==== Score keeping ====
"Cruzes e pontos" ("Crosses and dots")

Score is kept by tracking sets won, with the first partnership to reach 4 game points taking the set. Traditional scorecards are marked with two crosses – marked '"Nós"' ("we" or "us") and '"Eles"' ("they" or "them") – and a dot painted on the outer points to signify a game won.

A more modern method is to use a "comb" or "picket fence" to allocate 4 games per set.

Alternative "Pente e pontos" ("Comb and dots")

(In the graphic examples, the first set was won by "them" 4–2, and the second set, still in play, with "us" leading 3–1)

=== Alternative scoring rules ===
There are several scoring rules that diverge from country to country and even region to region. The most common are:

- Scoring 120 points being enough to win a set (4 games), as opposed to having to take all tricks. In the north of Portugal, your team has to win all the cards in the deck to be able to win a set (4 games), although in some places also in the north, if one team does not reach the 30 point threshold, the other gets the 4 point win as well. If this happens, it is said that the losing team got a pente in portuguese or comb, as a reference to one of the ways used to keep score, seen in the topic above.
- A full rubber being of 10 games and a half rubber being of 5 games (frequently played in the north of Portugal).
- If a team scores more than 90 points, the defeated one loses 2 games – this is called rolha in Portuguese or cork stopper as a literal translation (variation often played in southern regions of Portugal as Alentejo and Algarve).
- If there is a tie, both teams taking exactly 60 card points in tricks, neither scores, but the next hand is worth an extra game, although this rule can be often overlooked.

== Variations ==
=== Italian Sueca ===
"Sueca Italiana" ("Italian Sueca") is another game with the same rules of Sueca, but it is played with five players, each round divided into two teams (two players versus three) through a bidding system.

Deal

Each player is dealt eight (8) cards, thus all cards are dealt.

Bidding

Starting with the dealer, each player makes a bid – bidding a prediction of the number of card points they will win, between 61 and 120 – or they can bid zero (0). (The assumption is usually based on the cards in hand.)

The player that bid the highest points then becomes the lead and has the right to name a trump card (a card face and suit). If no one bids, then the dealer takes lead with a bid of zero.

- If the trump card is one the lead does not hold, then the player that holds that card will become their partner. This partner remains secret to all players (except the one that holds the card) until the card is played in a trick.
- If the trump card is one the lead has in hand then he plays alone. (This is useful if the bid is zero (0), and thus one player versus four.)

Game

The game is then played starting with the lead, and each player capturing his own winning tricks.

Counting Points

After the 8 tricks (all cards played out), the card points are added together by the lead and his partner. If the point total is equal or higher than the bid then they win, if lower than the opposing 3 player team wins.

If the bid was zero, then the lead and his partner need 61 or more to win.

Scoring

Each player in the winning team is then allocated game points.

Score is based on the bid amount – the higher the bid, the higher the game points, based on the following table:

Bid	Game Points
0, 61-70	1
71-80	2
81-90	3
91-100	4
101-119	5
120	6

== See also ==
- Bisca
- Scopa

== Literature ==
- Parlett, David (1991), A History of Card Games, Oxford: Oxford University Press, ISBN 0-19-282905-X
