= Karniffel =

Card game

- Thuringian descendant of Europe's oldest card game
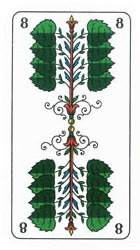
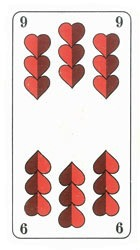
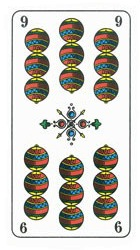
- The three 'beasts' in the game of Karniffel
- Origin: Germany
- Alternative names: Karniffeln
- Type: Plain-trick
- Players: 4
- Skills: bluffing, tactics
- Cards: 36
- Deck: German-suited
- Rank (high→low): Chosen: Beasts O U 6 8 9 D K 10 7 Plain: O U 6 8 9 D K 10 7

Related games
- Kaiserspiel, Karnöffel, Knüffeln, Alkort, Treikort, Bräus, Stýrivolt, Watten, Vorms
- Two chosen suits

Karniffel or Thuringian Karnöffel was a trick-taking card game for four players, playing in pairs, the rules of which were recorded in some detail in a German periodical of the late 18th century where it was described as being played by the Thuringian peasantry. Karniffel was a descendant of the original Karnöffel.

== History ==
Karniffel was a descendant of the original Karnöffel, which itself originated in Bavaria in the first quarter of the 15th century and is thus the oldest identifiable European card game in the history of playing cards with a continuous tradition of play down to the present day. Research in recent decades has identified a number of other card games played in Switzerland, with Swiss-suited cards, and in north Germany and the Baltic region, with French-suited cards, but the rules of Karniffel are recorded earlier than any of the other members of the family and it is one of only two variants known to use German-suited cards, the other being the Austro-Bavarian game of Watten. (The extinct Polish game of Drużbart also used German-suited cards; of the Polish pattern.)

Although games variously known as Karniffel, Karniffeln, Karnöffel or Karnöffeln, were played in much of German-speaking central Europe from around 1425, the earliest detailed description of a set of rules comes from an article in the periodical, Teutsche Merkur, dated 1783. This version, "Karniffel", was a derivative of 15th-century Karnöffel that became popular in Thuringia. Like its parent, it featured a highly unusual hierarchy and cards with special properties. However, it also differed significantly in that it used a 36-card pack and had the "surprising feature" of two chosen suits. Another oddity is that each side had a 'director' who instructs his partner on the cards to play.

Relatives of Karniffel that are still played today include Swedish Bräus, German Knüffeln and Faroese Stýrivolt.

=== Features ===
Karniffel had the following features that are unusual in card games:

- Three permanent top cards known as the 'beasts' (Thiere)
- Two 'chosen ' or 'selected' suits (Note: Dummett (1980), p. 187, calls them trumps or selected suits (gewählte Farben) They are not true trump suits as not all the cards have trumping powers.)
- Chosen cards with special powers - the Sevens and the free cards: the Eights and Nines
- Chosen cards with no trumping power at all - the Deuces, Kings and Tens
- One player on each team is the 'director' and instructs his partner(s) on what to play

Although the chosen suits are often referred to as trump suits, this is not strictly correct as not all the cards of these suits have normal trump powers: some only have powers when led and others have no powers at all.

== Cards ==
Karniffel was played with the 36 cards of a standard German-suited pack i.e. King, Ober, Unter, Ten, Nine, Eight, Seven, Six and Deuce in the suits of Acorns, Leaves, Hearts and Bells. However, the card ranking was highly unusual.

=== Beasts ===
There were three permanent top cards or matadors, known as the 'beasts':

- 8 - the Tolle ("Wild One", "Dare Devil" or "Madman") or Alter Thier ("Old Beast")
- 9 - the Roter Thier ("Red Beast")
- 9 - Gelber Thier ("Yellow Beast")

=== Chosen suits ===
Next came the cards of the two chosen suits. For example, if Leaves and Bells are selected, the cards rank as follows:

- O O - the Oberkarniffel or Landsknecht ("trooper" or "footsoldier")
- U U - the Unterkarniffel or Büttel ("beadle")
- 6 6 - the Papst ("Pope")
- 8 - free card (Freykarte) (Note: Wieland says the 8 and 9 were called Freykarten "presumably because, at least in respect of the 'unselected' suits... they could not be beaten." While in general, a Freykarte is a card that cannot be beaten even by one of its own suit, evidence from Knüffeln is that 'free cards' in these games are unbeatable when led, except by the beasts and high beaters such as the Oberkarniffels.)
- 9 - free card
- D D - Deuces
- K K - Kaiser ("Emperor")
- 10 10 - Banner or Pannier ("Banner")
- 7 7 - die böse Sieben ("the evil/bad/naughty Seven"). (Note: Originally known as the Teufel or "Devil" in Karnöffel.) When led to a trick, a chosen Seven automatically won, but it could not be led to the first trick.

The cards with trump-like powers are often referred to as 'beaters'. They are the 3 beasts plus the O, U, and 6 of the chosen suits.

=== Unselected suits ===
Although Wieland states that cards of the unselected suits rank in the same order: O > U > 6 > 8 > 9 > D > K > 10 > 7, he suggests earlier that this ranking only applies to the selected suits and that accords with all other descriptions of the rules of Karnöffel and its descendants, where unselected suits rank in their natural order: D > K > O > U > 10 > 9 > 8 > 7. (Note: Notably the 1850 Karnöffelgrammatik which is the closest in time and gameplay.) An Ober was known as Fauler Schlingel ("Lazy Rascal"), originally Fauler Fritz ("Lazy Freddy"), because it was unable to win anything until all the beaters had been exhausted.

== Rules ==
The following rules are based Wieland (1783) except where stated.

=== Aim ===
The aim is to win three or more tricks in each deal.

=== Preliminaries ===
The game is played by four or six players in two teams of two or three respectively. One player in each team is nominated as the 'director' or captain who may view the cards of his team and concede the game if it looks as if they will lose.

The dealer shuffles the cards, offers them to rearhand for cutting and deals five cards to each player and turns the next two over to determine the selected suits. If the second card is of the same suit, another card is turned and, if necessary, more until a different suit appears. Any player with a 'Banner' (trump 10) may now exchange it for the trump upcard of the same suit.

=== Playing ===
Forehand leads to the first trick. (Note: Play is assumed to be anti-clockwise, but this is not explicitly stated.) There are no constraints on play to a trick. The trick is won, in order, by:

- Trump 7 if led
- Free card if led, unless beaten by a beast or Oberkarniffel (Note: But see earlier comment - the source does not specify which trumps beat a free card)
- Highest beast
- Highest O U 6 of selected suit
- Highest card of led suit (Note: Dummett (1980) suggests that the lower chosen cards (D, K, 10) act as their own suit for this purpose, e.g. a chosen D beats a chosen K of the same suit, but if an unselected card is led, it is not beaten by a chosen D, K or 10. This accords with the modern rules for Knüffeln.)

Wiegand does not make clear what rule applies if two cards of equal value (both trumps or both non-trumps) are played. In other variants of Karnöffel, the trick is won either by the first of the two cards played (e.g. Watten) or suit priority applies in the order: Acorns, Leaves, Hearts and Bells or their French-suited equivalent (e.g. most of the Bruus family)

=== Scoring ===
The team that wins three or more tricks wins the stake for the game.

== Literature ==
- Wieland, Christoph Martin, ed. (1783). "Beytrag zur Geschichte der Kartenspiele" in Der Teutsche Merkur, Vol. 58, Weimar, pp. 62-87.
- Dummett, Michael (1978). Reviews of "Der Nidwaldener Kaiserjass Und Seine Geschichte" and "Der Kaiserjass, Wie Er Heute in Nidwalden Gespielt Wird" in The Playing Card, Vol. 9, No. 4, May 1981.
- Dummett, Michael (1980). The game of Tarot: from Ferrara to Salt Lake City, Duckworth, London. ISBN 9780715610145
- Smith, Anthony (1997), "Voormsi" in The Playing Card, Vol. 26, No. 2, 1997.
- Vollbeding, Johann Christoph (1795). Supplemente zum Archiv nützlicher Erfindungen und wichtiger Entdeckungen in Künsten und Wissenschaften, Volume 2. Schwickertschen Verlage, Leipzig, pp. 267-269.
- Voss, Ernst (1930). Karnoeffelspiel, A German Card Game of the Sixteenth Century in Transactions of the Wisconsin Academy of Sciences, Arts and Letters, Vol. XXV, ed. by Chancey Juday.
