= Blank (playing card) =

Card worth few or no points

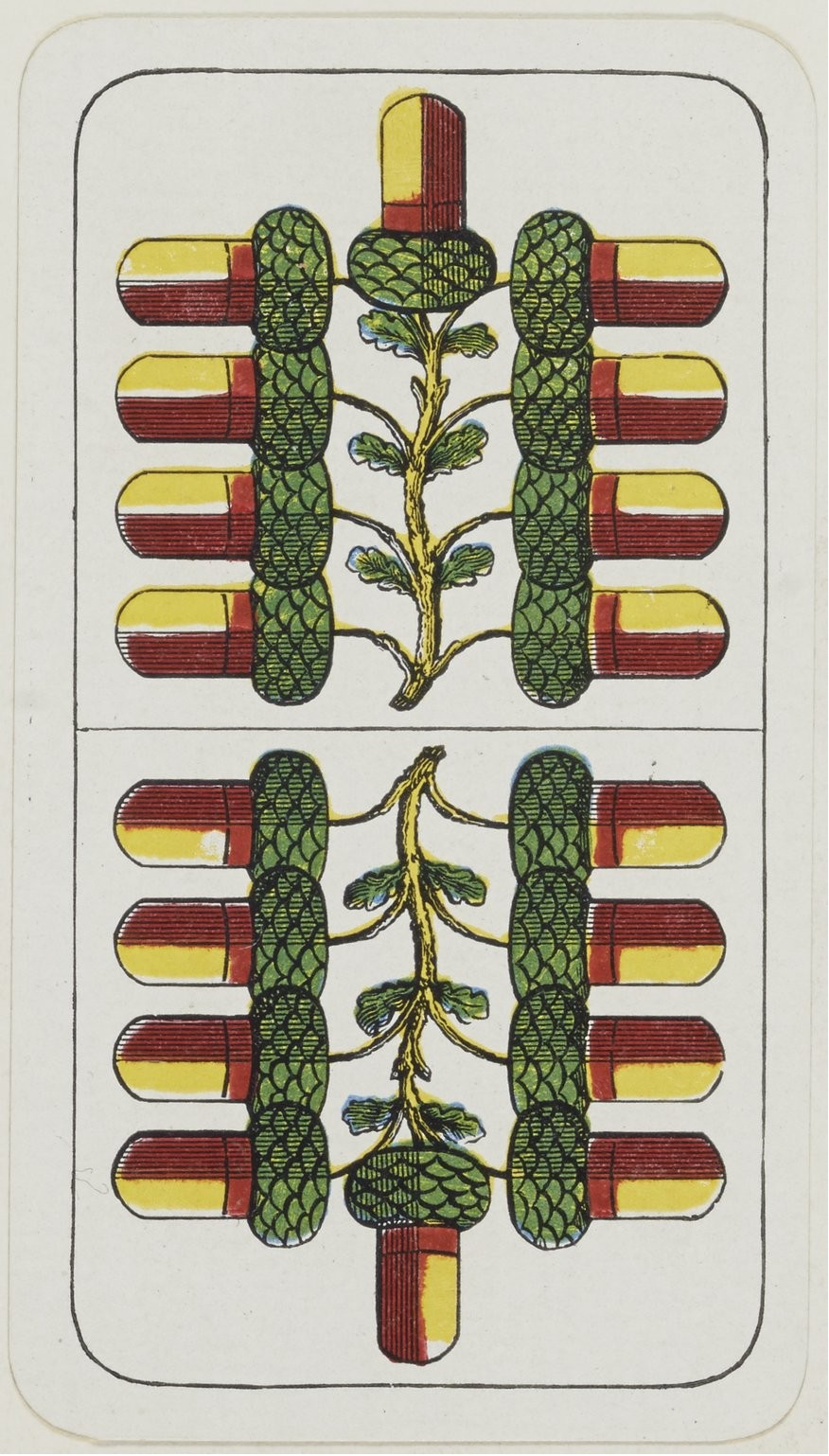
In games like Skat, the Nine of Acorns is a worthless blank.

A blank is a playing card in card-point games that is a non-counter, or is worth nothing. In Poker, the term refers to a community card which is extremely unlikely to help any remaining player.

The names of the non-counters varies from region to region and game to game. In Poker, they are blanks, bricks or bombs. In the German games of Schafkopf, Doppelkopf, Sixty-six and Skat, the 7s, 8s and 9s in all card suits are Luschen. In the popular Swiss game of Jass the Luschen are the 6s, 7s, 8s and 9s; unlike Skat, however, the 9 of trumps, "Nell", is worth 14 points and is thus an exception; it ranks in the hierarchy immediately below the highest trump card, the Jack or Unter of Trumps (20 points) and above the Ace of Trumps (11 points). In Schafkopf, the 9s, 8s and 7s are also known as Spatzen ("sparrows") or Zwiebeln ("onions"). There are no blanks in games like Whist or Bridge, because they are plain-trick games where it is the number of tricks that counts, not the value of the cards won.

Similar nicknames are given to very low-scoring cards. For example, in Tarock games, tarocks and pip cards score 1/3 of a point and are called Glatzen or Glatz'n, Skartindeln, Skatindeln or Skartins; and suit cards other than court cards are also called Ladons, Latons or Ladonis. Dummett calls them collectively low cards. In French Tarot they are the cartes basses. Low-value poker cards may be called rags.

In the Brusbart family of games, although cards do not have point values, certain cards are worthless in the sense that they cannot beat anything, even lower cards of the same suit. In Bruus and other members of the family they are 'duds' (Luschen or Fosen) or 'worthless cards' (wertlose Karten), but in Brus they are called 'windmills'. In Bräus, they are literally unplayable and only serve to pad out the hand.

== Bibliography ==
- Bamberger, Johannes (2011). Tarock: Die schönsten Varianten. 22nd edition. Vienna: Perlen-Reihe. ISBN 978-3-99006-000-1
- Dummett, Michael (1980). The Game of Tarot. From Ferrara to Salt Lake City. London: Duckworth. ISBN 0-7156-1014-7
- Kastner, Hugo and Gerald Kador Folkvord (2005). Die große Humboldt-Enzyklopädie der Kartenspiele. Baden-Baden: Humboldt. ISBN 978-3-89994-058-9
- Mayr, Wolfgang and Robert Sedlaczek (2016). Die Strategie des Tarockspiels. Königrufen, Zwanzigerrufen, Neunzehnerrufen, Dreiertarock, Strohmanntarock. 5th expanded edition, Vienna: Atelier, ISBN 978-3-902498-22-9
- Parlett, David (2008). The Penguin Book of Card Games. London: Penguin. ISBN 978-0-141-03787-5.
