= Drużbart =

Extinct Polish card game

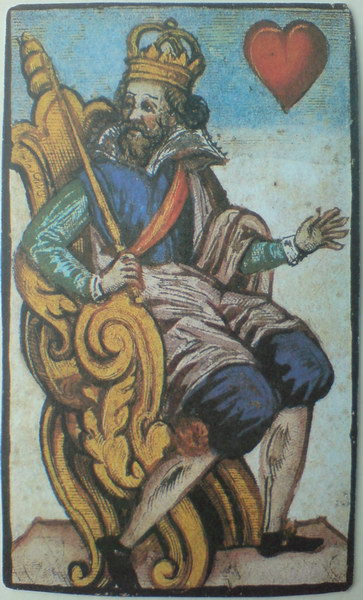
- The Drużbart
- Origin: Poland
- Type: Plain-trick
- Family: Karnöffel group
- Players: 4
- Cards: 32 or 36
- Deck: German pack
- Rank (high→low): 8 K 9 9s As Us 6s (remainder are 'duds')
- Play: Clockwise

Related games
- Bräus • Brus • Brús • Brusbart/Bruus • Voormsi

Drużbart or Druzbart is an extinct Polish card game of the Bruus family. The game is descended from the oldest known card game in Europe, Karnöffel, a fact testified by its unusual card ranking and lack of a uniform trump suit.

Drużbart is designed for four players and is played with 36 cards of a German pack, each of the four suits comprising the cards 7–10, Unter, Ober, King, and Ace.

== Background ==
Drużbart is one of a family of games descended from Karnöffel, the oldest European card game with a continuous tradition of play to the present day. These games are characterised by "the wildly disturbed ranking order in the chosen suit and particularly by the special role of the chosen Seven." It is one of the Brusbart family of games whose progenitor was the German game of Brusbart. Other members of the family include Russian Bruzbart or Dulya, Livonian Brusbart, Swedish Bräus, Danish and Estonian Brus, and Greenlandic Voormsi. More distant cousins include Faroese Stýrivolt and Schleswig Knüffeln.

The game was widespread in Poland during the 18th century, one account describing how ladies in an upper-class house played it as an after-dinner game along with Zwicken. In the 19th century it is recorded as being played "by the lower classes or children" and in 1840 as being "in vogue among the common people." However, there are only two imperfect descriptions of its mode of play, dating to 1831 and 1888. (Note: Excluding later versions which are more or less reprints in 1893 (2nd edn of 1888 book), 1906, 1930 (slightly revised copy by Wytrawny Gracz) and 2012 (reprint of 1930 book).)

Druzbart was the favourite game of Count Henryk Rzewuski, the Polish journalist, novelist, and poet who was a master of the Polish gawęda szlachecka, Adam Mickiewicz, the Polish poet and scholar, was also a player and enjoyed Drużbart during his stay in St. Petersburg in 1828.

Druzbart appears to be extinct, although it was included in a 2012 reprint of the 1930 card game compendium by Gracz.

== Cards ==
A German-suited, Polish pattern pack of 36 cards was used. In the 1831 account the beaters (Note: Beaters are cards that can win a trick if they outrank all the others in that trick, as opposed to 'duds' - see later.) rank as follows, from highest to lowest (D = Deuce, O = Ober, U = Unter):

- 8 – Dola (Note: Gołębiowski says the Dola is the 6 of Leaves but then goes on to say that the "8s, except for the Dola, ...are of no value in this game." Contemporary Polish dictionaries, e.g. Trojański (1835), confirm that the Dola was the 8 of Leaves and this is also mirrored in Brusbart, the game from which Druzbart originated. Anthony Smith (1997) who extensively researched this family of games also believes the 8 of Leaves is intended. Gołębiowski's error is repeated by later authors e.g. Siodmy (1861), Gracz, S. (1888) and Gracz, W. (1930). Gracz, S. (1888) also erroneously says the Starka is the 9 of Leaves when most sources confirm it is the 9 of Acorns as one would expect. His mistake is copied by Gracz, W. (1930).)
- K – Drużbart
- 9 – Starka
- 9 9 9
- D D D D
- O O O O
- U U U U
- 6 6 6 6

Cards of the same value (e.g. the four Obers) ranked among one another in the suit order shown above: Acorns, Leaves, Hearts, Bells. The three highest cards are called matadors (matedorami), and their names appear to derive from the German words Toller ("the mad one"), Brusbart ("bushy beard"), and Starker ("the strong one"). Sevens were unbeatable when led. (Note: Gracz, S. (1888) states that the three matadors may beat a led seven and he is followed by Gracz, W. (1930). This may be a later rule.) The remaining cards—the Eights, Kings, and Tens—were 'duds', only fit for discarding.

== Rules ==
The following outline of the rules is based on Gołębiowski (1831) and Stary Gracz (1888). The 1930 rules by Wytrawny Gracz are largely a reprint of the 1888 rules.

A 32- or 36-card German-suited, Polish pattern pack was used. Gołębiowski uses 36 cards; Stary Gracz omits the 10s. (Note: Today, these can be substituted by any German-suited pack of the right number of cards.)

The aim is to win the most tricks and achieve certain feats. Four players form two teams of two (having drawn cards to decide partnerships - Gracz), with partners sitting opposite one another and sharing a common trick pile. There are no trumps and, at each card rank (excepting matadors and duds), suits have the following order of precedence: Acorns, Leaves, Hearts, and Bells. The dealer (the one who drew the lowest card - Gracz) deals 9 cards (8 cards - Gracz) to each player, presumably clockwise and in packets of three, but the sources are silent on the exact procedure.

Forehand leads with any card. Players need not follow suit, but must head the trick to win it. (Note: The source just says players "must head the trick", in which case it is unlike other members of the Brusbart family, where any card may always be played with no requirement to 'beat' previous cards.) Sevens are unbeatable when led (variation: except by the matadors – Gracz), but otherwise worthless and cannot beat any other card. Eights, Tens, and Kings are of no value, with the exception of those that are matadors.

The player who has played the highest card wins the trick and leads to the next. If four duds are played, the player who led the first dud wins the trick and leads to the next. Nine tricks are played and there are penalties for losing four tricks in a row, losing the first five tricks or losing all nine. (Note: It is possible that play may end after a team has five tricks if their opponents have at least one, since no further points may be scored, but the rules do not say this.)

=== Scoring ===
Two different scoring systems are described, neither of which is totally clear.

==== Gołębiowski (1831) ====
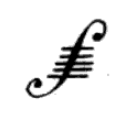
Gołębiowski's scoring scheme

Players draw a scoring diagram at the start of the game. Gołębiowski's example is in the form of a vertical 'S' with 5 horizontal lines. (Note: This is Figure 7 at the back of his book. The typical practice in these games was to chalk it on the table or a slate. Each team had the 5 lines one side of the 'S' and a line was erased for each point scored.) The team scoring the most tricks erases a line or, if they take the first four, two lines. (Note: The author may have meant "first five tricks" since it is normal in this family of games to award two points for winning 5-0. A team could win the first 4 tricks and still lose the hand, since there are 9 tricks in toto.) The team that erases their lines first, records "as many sticks" for their opponents as they have left. (Note: This means that difference in score is awarded as 'penalty game points' - so-called "sticks" - to the losers. Typically they would have been chalked as lines on the frame of the slate.) If the Druzbart is captured by the Dola, the capturing team awards 'spectacles' (okulary) to the side that lost the Druzbart; if the Druzbart is lost to one's partner, 'scissors' (nożyczki) are awarded. Various penalty symbols are awarded for other feats. A team losings all its tricks receives a "whip" (biczyk); a team losing the first five tricks receives a "cat" (kota) and a team losing having taken only one trick chalks up a "dagger" (rożen).

==== Gracz (1888) ====
According to Stary Gracz, players chalk a number of lines on a slate, known as clubs (palek), sticks (kijów), canes (rózg), broomsticks (ożogów), etc. A line is erased for each deal won and an extra line for taking four tricks in succession. Losing a matador, now including the Starka, results in 'spectacles' being awarded; losing one to a partner results in 'scissors' being chalked up for that side. A 'dagger' is drawn for the side that fails to erase more than one line during the game. A team winning all nine tricks chalks a 'cat' for their opponents. (Note: This seems more appropriate than the feat of winning the first five tricks as in Gołębiowski, since a cat has nine lives.) A team with a run of cards e.g. 6-7-8-9, (Note: It is not stated whether this is a suit sequence or what the minimum length of run is - presumably three cards.) chalk up a 'gypsy' (cygana) for their opponents and if a team has the Dola and Starka, their opponents receive a 'Jew' (żyda). If the sequence includes the Druzbart, a 'goat' (kozę) is drawn. "The variety and originality of these drawings depend on the players' sense of humour and imagination" and result in "endless laughter and mirth".

== Clock Druzbart ==
Gołębiowski describes a three-hand game known as Clock Druzbart (Zégarek drużbart). Here, players play for themselves and lines are chalked up in the form of a tripod with one line erased for each trick taken. Otherwise the rules are the same as in the four-player game.

== Literature ==
- Doroszewski, Witold, ed. (1960), Slownik języka polskiego, p. 396.
- Dummett, Michael (1978). Reviews of "Der Nidwaldener Kaiserjass Und Seine Geschichte" and "Der Kaiserjass, Wie Er Heute in Nidwalden Gespielt Wird" in The Playing Card, Vol. 9, No. 4, May 1981.
- Forster, Charles (1840). Pologne. Paris: Didot Frères.
- Giżycki Jerzy and Baruch Harold Wood (1972). History of Chess. Abbey Library.
- Gołębiowski, Łukasz (1831). Gry i zabawy różnych stanów w kraju całym, lub niektórych tylko prowincyach. Warsaw.
- Gracz, Stary [Stanislaw Kozietulski writing under the pseudonym of “Old Player”] (1888). Gry w karty dawniejsze i nowe. Warsaw: S. Olgebranda Synów. pp. 31–33.
- Gracz, Wytrawny ["Consummate Player"] (1930, reprinted 2012). Gry w karty polskie i obce. Warsaw: Wydawnictwo Xeein.
- Heraty, J. (1981). New Catholic Encyclopedia, Volumes 1-19.
- McLeod, John (1996). "Styrivolt, Vorms and Cicera" in The Playing Card, Volume 25, No. 2.
- Miłosz, Czesław (1983). The History of Polish Literature, 2nd edn. Berkeley/LA/London: UCP.
- Parlett, David (2008). The Penguin Book of Card Games, Penguin, London. ISBN 978-0-141-03787-5
- Siodmy, Tom (1861). Encyklopedyja Powszechna. Vol. 7. Den. – Eck. Orgelbrand, Warsaw. p. 503.
- Smith, Anthony (1997). "Voormsi: A Greenlandic Descendant of Karnöffel" in The Playing-Card with which is incorporated Playing-Card World; Journal of the International Playing-Card Society, Vol. 26, by Beal, ed. George, July/August 1997 - May/June 1998. Published by The International Playing-Card Society, ISSN 0305-2133.
- 1835 Trojański, Józef Kajetan (1835). Dokładny polsko-niemiecki słownik z dodatkiem, zawieraiącym spis form nieregularnych, Volume 1, A – P, p. 142
- Ward, Sir Adolphus William, George Walter Prothero, and Stanley Leathes (1909). The Cambridge Modern History, Volume 11. Catholic University of America: University Press.
