= Neunkart =

German card game

Neunkart ("Nine Cards") or Fett und Mager ("Fat and Lean") was a traditional North German card game played with 36 French-suited cards.

== History and description ==
The game is mentioned as early as 1800 by Johann Friedrich Schütze as Neegenkaart and Fett un Mager in his Holstein dictionary, where it is described as a favourite game of Holstein farmers and townsfolk. Players were dealt 9 cards each and there was a trump suit. (Note: Presumably played by four players with a (then) standard 36-card, French-suited pack, typical of the region.) The first, "higher paid" tricks were the "fat ones" and the last tricks, paid at half the value, were the "lean ones." (Note: If stakes were anted by all players each time, there were probably three fat tricks and six lean ones. Players anted 3 stakes each, making 12 in total. The first three tricks paid 2 each and the last six tricks 1 stake each, thus emptying the pot. If only the dealer anted, the stake had to be quite large e.g. with 13 stakes, the first four tricks would be worth 2 each and the last five 1 each.)

The game was also spelt Negenkaart. Around 1865 it is one of the many card games played by Eiderstedt farmers at Christmas alongside, Brausbart, Dreikart, Fünfkart, Fips, Karnüffel, Scherwenzel, Hahnrei and others. But by around 1890, it was one of only two card games still being played by farmers in the Eiderstedt region alongside Dreekort.

As Nikort or Fedt og Magert it was played in Denmark in the 19th century alongside numerous other games.

== Bibliography ==
- _. (1865). "Weihnachten in Schleswig-Holstein" in Die Grenzboten, Vol. 4; Vol. 24, pp. 974–986.
- _. (1892). Zeitschrift für deutsche Kulturgeschichte, Volume 3, Bauer & Raspe.
- Berghaus, Dr. Heinrich Karl Wilhelm (1883). Der Sprachschatz der Sassen: ein Wörterbuch der Plattdeütschen Sprache. Vol. 2 (J–R). Berlin W.: R. Eisenschmidt.
- Feilberg, Henning Frederik (1864). Fra Heden Hadersley.
- Schütze, Johann Friedrich (1800). Holsteinisches Idiotikon. Part 1. Hamburg: Heinrich Ludgwig Villaume.
