= Bräus =

Old Swedish card game from the island of Gotland

- Swedish version of Brusbart
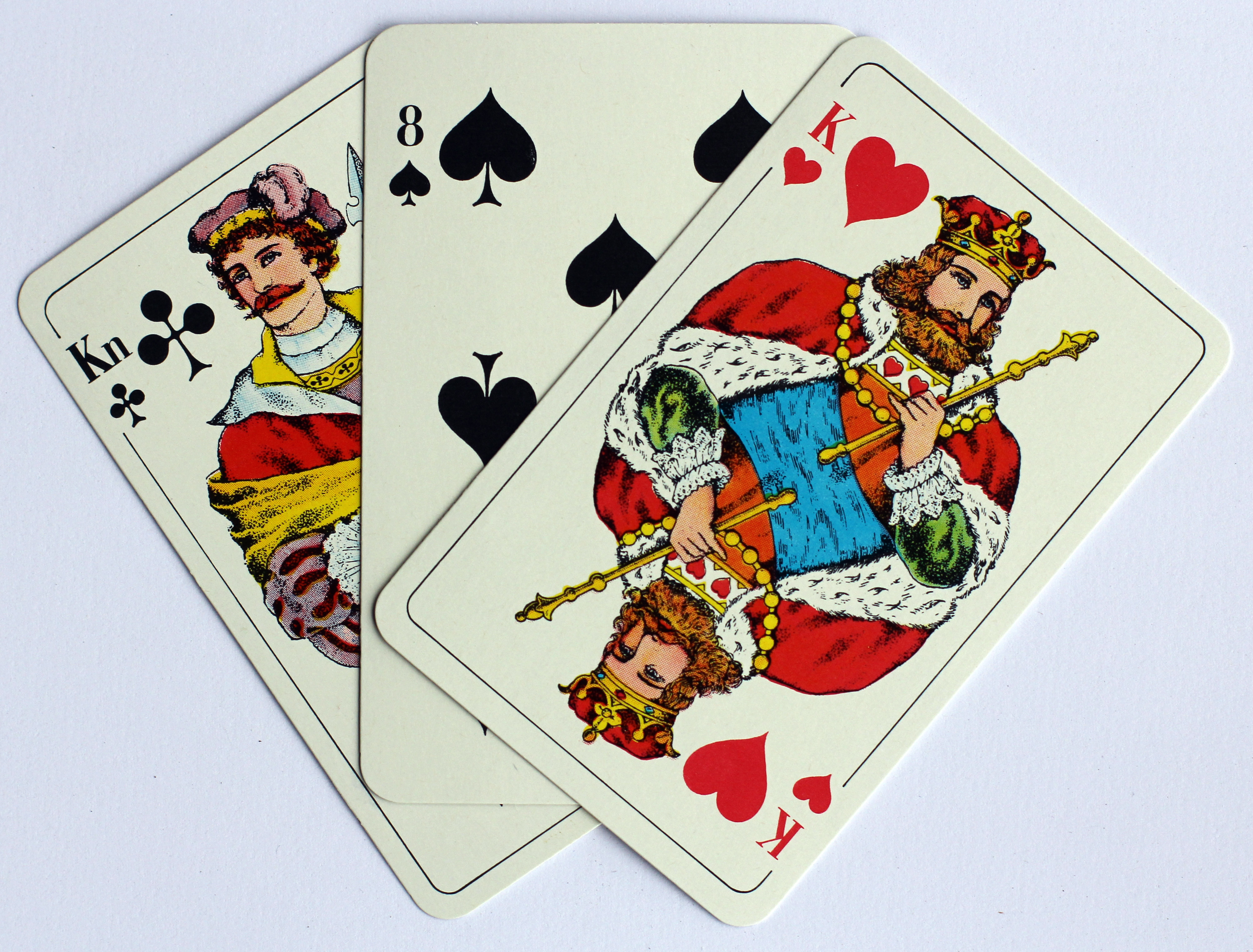
- The matadors
- Origin: North Germany
- Type: Plain-trick game
- Family: Karnöffel group
- Players: 4
- Cards: 36
- Deck: French pack
- Rank (high→low): J♣ 8♠ K♥ 9s As Js 6s (rest are unplayable)
- Play: Clockwise

Related games
- Brus • Brús • Bruus • Drużbart • Voormsi
- Four chosen suits Playable and unplayable cards No daring and striking

Bräus (or Brus (Note: Smith and Parlett both call the Gotlandic game 'Brus' while acknowledging 'Bräus' as an alternative. All Swedish sources call it 'Bräus' as does McLeod at pagat.com. Meanwhile Brus is the name of the related Danish variant.)) is an old Swedish card game from the island of Gotland that differs from all others in that not all cards are actually playable. The game is descended from the oldest known card game in Europe, Karnöffel, a fact testified by its unusual card ranking and lack of a uniform trump suit.

Bräus is designed for four players and is played with 36 cards of a French pack, each of the four suits comprising the cards 6-10, Jack, Queen, King, and Ace. However, only 22 of these cards may be played.

== Background ==
Bräus is one of a family of games descended from Karnöffel, the oldest European card game with a continuous tradition of play down to the present day. These games are characterised by "the wildly disturbed ranking order in the chosen suit and particularly by the special role of the chosen Seven." Close relatives include German Bruus or Brusbart, Russian Bruzbart or Dulya, Livonian Brusbart, Polish Drużbart, Danish and Estonian Brus and Greenlandic Voormsi. More distant cousins include Faroese Stýrivolt and Schleswig Knüffeln.

Gotland is a Swedish island in the Baltic Sea that has been ruled at various times in history by the Danes and the Teutonic Knights, among others. It has been Swedish since 1645. The game of Bräus is one of a family of games played in the Baltic region and Scandinavia that descend from Karnöffel, a card game that has been recorded since 1426.

Gotland is the only place in Sweden where Bräus is still played. It underwent a brief revival in the 1980s possibly due to the "touristic rediscovery of folklore and customs", and has remained popular enough that an annual Bräus world championship is still held. It is still being actively taught.

=== Cards ===
Card ranking in Bräus
Matadors
J♣ 8♠ K♥
Playable cards
9♣ 9♠ 9♥ 9♦ A♣ A♠ A♥ A♦ J♠ J♥ J♦ 6♣ 6♠ 6♥ 6♦
Sevens - unbeatable when led
7♣ 7♠ 7♥ 7♦
Unplayable cards
K♣ K♠ K♦ Q♣ Q♠ Q♥ Q♦ 10♣ 10♠ 10♥ 10♦ 8♣ 8♥ 8♦

A French-suited, Swedish-pattern pack is normally used with the Twos, Threes, Fours and Fives removed. Not all the cards are playable. The playable cards rank as follows, from highest to lowest:

- J♣ - Spit or Spiten
- 8♠ - Dull or Dullen
- K♥ - Bräus or Bräusen
- Nines
- Aces
- Jacks
- Sixes

The three highest cards—Spit, Dull and Bräus—are called matadors (makdoros). The Nines, Aces, Jacks, and Sixes rank among themselves in suit order, for example the A♣ beats the A♠, A♥, and A♦, but any Ace is beaten by any Nine. The Sevens only have power if they are led, when they count individually as a trick. The remaining 14 cards are 'unplayable cards' or 'duds'—they serve to pad out the players' hands but have no value or to "randomise the distribution of playable cards."

The 9♣ is known as the plågu or "torment" because it may force an opponent to play a matador rather than hold it back. The A♠ is called grodballen or "frog's testicles."

== Rules ==
In Bräus, there are always two teams. If four play, partners sit opposite one another; if six play, the team players sit alternately. The overall aim is to win six 'strokes' (game points) for the game. In each deal the aim is to win six tricks. (Note: Smith reports that the six-handed game used to be played to a target of five tricks according to Göran Åckermann.)

=== Dealing ===
The dealer shuffles the cards, offers them to the right for cutting and deals the cards individually and in clockwise order. If four play, each receives nine cards; if six play, each player gets six cards.

=== Playing ===
Forehand (the player to the left of the dealer) begins by laying out any Sevens held, each Seven counting by itself as a trick. Forehand then leads a playable or 'live' card. The other players follow in clockwise order by playing a higher card if possible; otherwise they pass. They may never discard.

The player who has played the highest card wins the trick. The trick winner then plays any Sevens held and leads a playable card. If unable to do either, the player passes and the lead rotates to the left. Play continues until one team takes six tricks. If a team has five tricks and the King of Clubs, they may count it as a sixth trick. If neither side takes six tricks, it is a draw and the same dealer deals again.

=== Scoring ===
One point is scored for winning six tricks. If the winners score 6–0, they have made Jan (Note: Parlett calls this 'a lurch', borrowing no doubt from Cribbage, but the word means more like 'a licking' or 'a thrashing'. It is also not quite the same as a lurch, which means to fail to achieve half the score needed to win. Here it is about losing with an entirely blank score sheet and the usual native term for that in this family of games is a jan or jann, pronounced "yann".) and score 2 points. Game is six points.

== Literature ==
- Åkerman, Göran (1992). "Kan du spela brus?". Kartofilen. No. 3. Uppsala. pp. 22–23.
- Dummett, Michael (1978). Reviews of "Der Nidwaldener Kaiserjass Und Seine Geschichte" and "Der Kaiserjass, Wie Er Heute in Nidwalden Gespielt Wird" in The Playing Card, Vol. 9, No. 4, May 1981.
- Glimne, Dan (2016). Kortspelshandboken (3rd revised ed.). Stockholm: Känguru. pp. 81–83. ISBN 978-91-7663-115-7.
- Glimne, Dan (2000). Kortspelsguiden. Stockholm: B. Wahlström. pp. 25–27. ISBN 91-32-32561-4.
- McLeod, John (1996). "Styrivolt, Vorms and Cicera" in The Playing Card, Volume 25, No. 2.
- Parlett, David (2008). The Penguin Book of Card Games. London: Penguin. ISBN 978-0-141-03787-5.
- Smith, Anthony (1993). "The Game of Brus" in The Playing Card World, No. 74, November 1993.
- Smith, Anthony (1997). "Voormsi: A Greenlandic Descendant of Karnöffel" in The Playing-Card with which is incorporated Playing-Card World; Journal of the International Playing-Card Society, Vol. 26, by Beal, ed. George, July/August 1997 - May/June 1998. Published by The International Playing-Card Society, ISSN 0305-2133.
