= Voormsi =

Card game

- Greenland's version of Brusbart
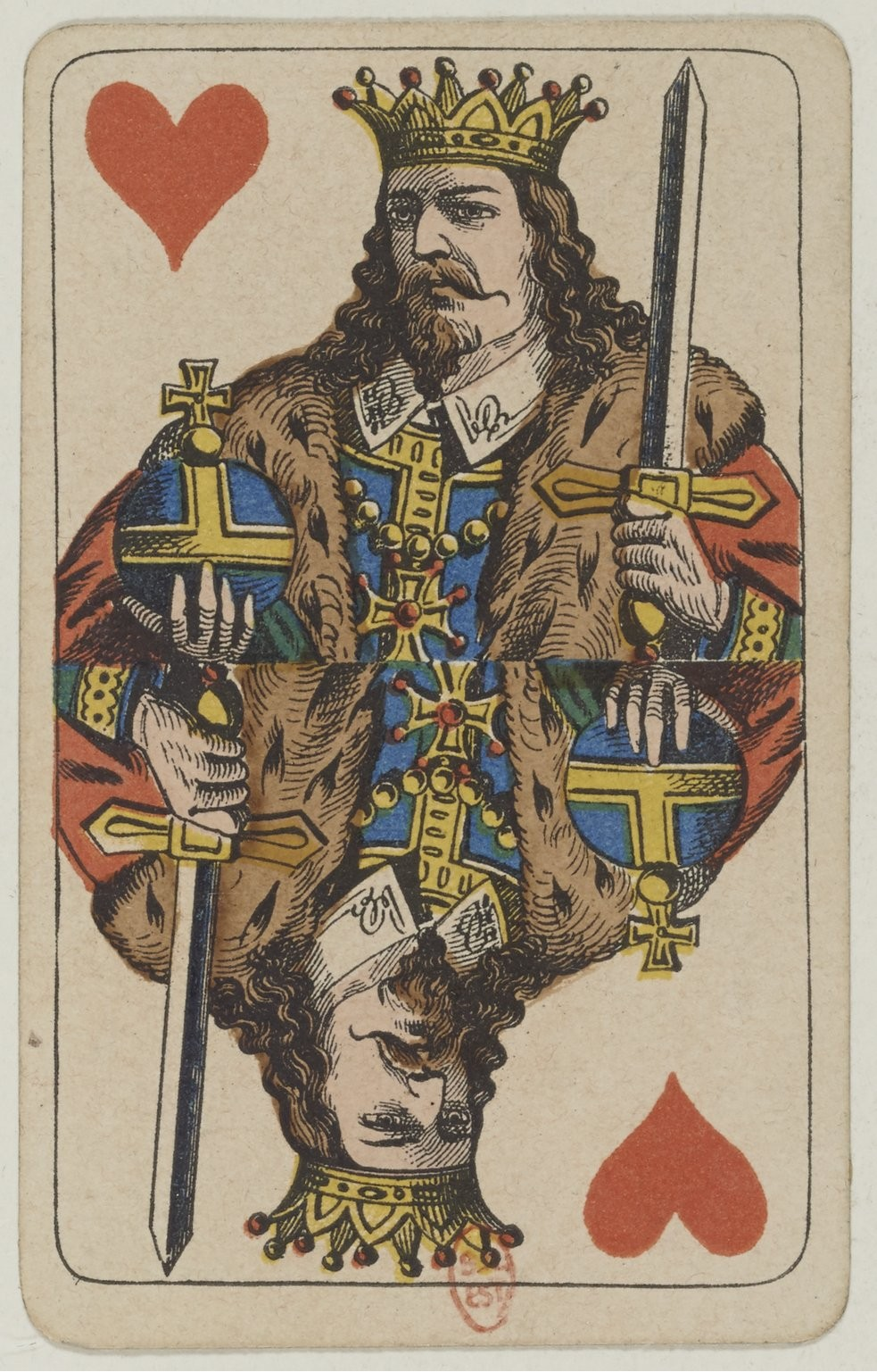
- The Voormsi
- Origin: North Germany
- Alternative names: Vorms, Wumps
- Type: Plain-trick game
- Family: Karnöffel group
- Players: 4 (2 or 3 possible)
- Cards: 36
- Deck: French pack
- Rank (high→low): ♣J & ♥K ♠8 9s As Js 6s 5s 8s Qs Ks
- Play: Clockwise

Related games
- Bräus • Brus • Brús • Brusbart/Bruus • Drużbart
- Features double, triple and quadruple tricks; 7s, ♦3, ♣K & ♠K with special powers.

Voormsi or Vorms is an old, Greenlandic, trick-taking card game of the Brusbart family designed for four players.

== History ==
Voormsi is "reputed to be ancient", possibly dating to the Whaling Period before 1721, between the late 15th century disappearance of the Norse settlement and the arrival of Danish missionaries. During this time, the only contacts with Europeans were with pirates and whalers.

Its rules and terminology strongly suggest that it is descended from the centuries-old German game of Brusbart, now known as Bruus, which was once the national game of Hamburg and which spread across most of northern Europe spawning a family of similar games such as Russian Bruzbart, Polish Drużbart, Swedish Bräus, Icelandic Brús and others. Brusbart in turn descends from Karnöffel, the oldest card game in Europe with a continuous tradition of play down to the present day, a fact testified to by "the wildly disturbed ranking order in the chosen suit and particularly by the special role of the chosen Seven". (Note: In terms of the card ranking, all four suits are 'chosen'.)

== Cards ==
A 36-card, French-suited pack is used with the cards A K Q J 9 8 7 6 and 5 in the four suits of Clubs, Spades, Hearts and Diamonds. (Note: Note that there are no 10s, reminiscent of Styrvolt, as well as no 4s, 3s (♦3 excepted) or Deuces.) In addition the ♦K is replaced by the ♦3. The two, equal-ranking, highest cards or matadors are Toqutsit ("hangman" or "executioner"), the ♠J, and Voormsi, (Note: Pronounced 'woormsi'; it is not a native Greenlandic word, but equates to the Danish/Swedish word "Brus".) the ♥K. If both are played to a trick the second one wins. The third matador is the ♠8. Next in order are the Nines, Aces, remaining Jacks, Sixes, Fives, remaining Eights, Queens and remaining Kings. Within each rank they beat each other in the aforementioned suit order.

The ♦3 is useless when led, but unbeatable if added to a trick. The Sevens have their usual Brusbart privileges: unbeatable when led except by the ♦3, a higher Seven or the ♣KK. If the ♣K has been led or played on a Seven, it may be beaten by the ♠K, a card that is otherwise useless. (Note: To beat the ♣K, it must be played as the next card.) This feature appears in Brus, the Danish member of the Brusbart family. If the ♦3 is led and a Seven played second, the Seven has the same privileges as if it had been led.

== Description ==
The following description is based on Smith (1998), supplemented by McLeod (2000):

The aim is to score points by winning tricks and by capturing certain high cards. There are four players in two teams of two, the partners sitting opposite one another. Deal and play are clockwise and there are 9 tricks. The playing cutting the lowest card deals first, giving 4 cards to each player. The trick is won by the highest ranking card (subject to the rules above) and the trick winner leads to the next. After each trick, the trick winner replenishes the played cards, followed by the others in order until the stock is exhausted.

The game features double, triple and quadruple tricks whereby the player on lead may play a single card as normal or may lead two, three or four cards of the same rank. The others must play the same number of cards and must beat each of the led cards separately to win the trick, albeit not necessarily with cards of equal rank.

If Voormsi is played and wins the trick (except as the last card or if Toqusit has already been played), 1 bonus point is scored and the Voormsi player shows all hand cards to an opponent to prove Toqusit was not held. If the opposing team have Toqusit when Voormsi is played, they must play it, in which case they win the trick and score 2 bonus points. (Note: Only if Voormsi would have won the trick; clearly if a Seven has been led, for example, neither matador can win the trick.) If a player beats a partner's Voormsi with Toqusit they lose all points and the game. Beating Voormsi with the ♦3 also earns a bonus point, whoever owned it. Beating Toqusit when it has just beaten Voormsi earns 2 points and the Toqusit bonus is forfeited.

The winning team scores 1 point for taking five tricks plus 1 point for each additional trick taken. Winning the first five tricks earns 2 points, but winning all nine nullifies the deal. Play cannot end while one side has an unbroken sequence of tricks. A team scoring too many points goes bust and incurs penalty points to the value of their overshoot points.

Players draw a ladder to score and erase or tick off one rung on their side of the ladder for each point. Game is nine points. This may be attained simultaneously by both teams e.g. if the trick breaking a sequence gives points to one side while the other's sequence is scored.

== Variants ==
There are also two- and three-player variants.

== Bibliography ==
- Dummett, Michael (May 1981). "Reviews of "Der Nidwaldener Kaiserjass Und Seine Geschichte" and "Der Kaiserjass, Wie Er Heute in Nidwalden Gespielt Wird"". The Playing Card. 9 (4).
- McLeod, John (1996). "Styrivolt, Vorms and Cicera". The Playing Card. 25 (2).
- Smith, Anthony (Sep–Oct 1997). "Voormsi: A Greenlandic descendant of Karnöffel". The Playing-Card. 26 (2). ISSN 0305-2133.
