= Schwesing =

Schwesing Svesing
- Municipality
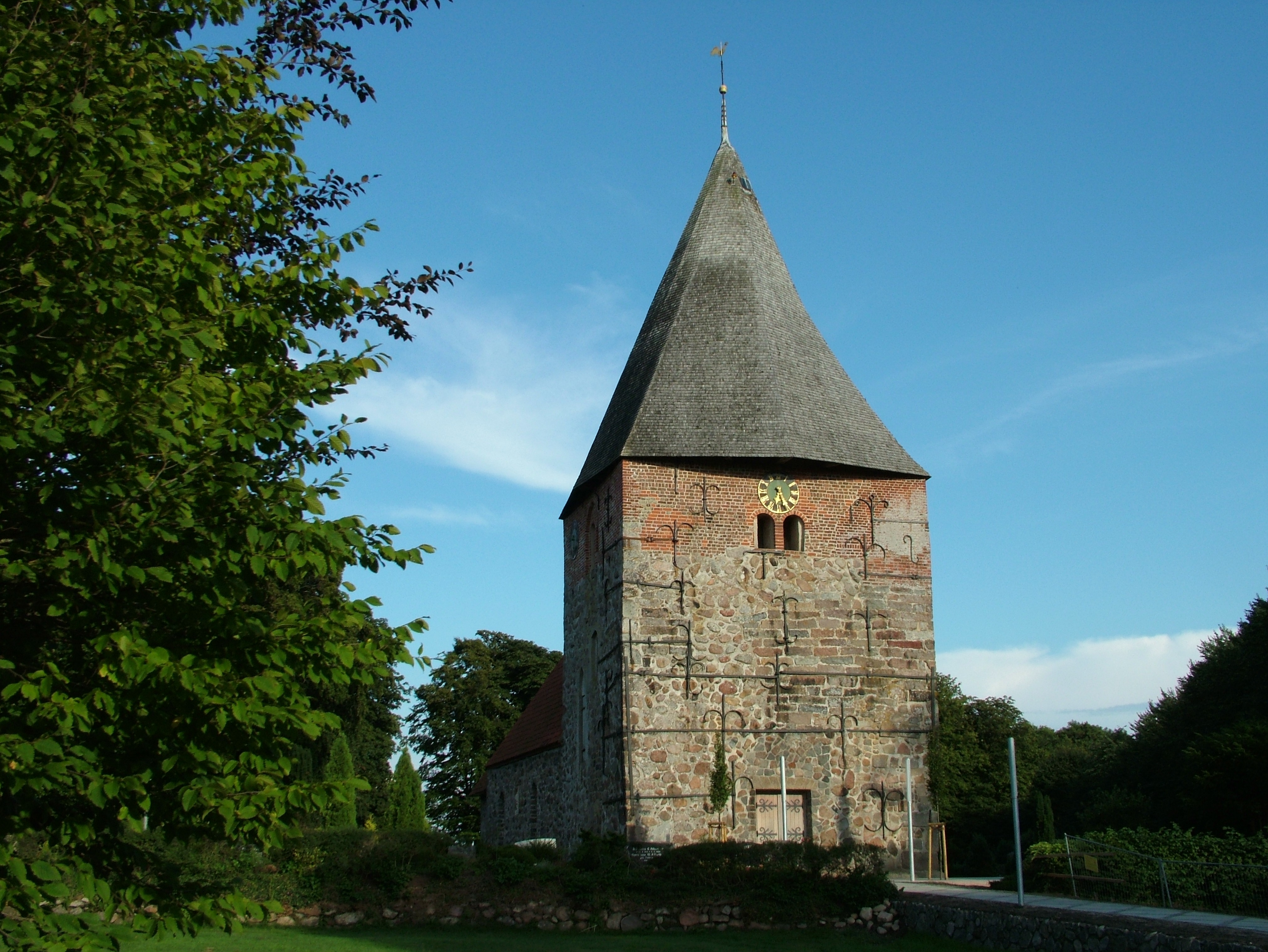
- The church in Schwesing

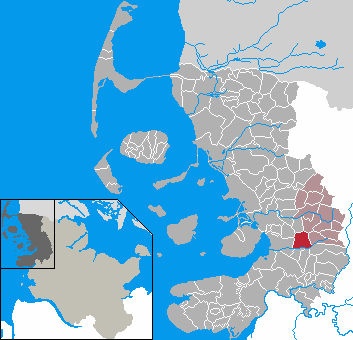
- Location of Schwesing; Svesing within Nordfriesland district
- Interactive map of Schwesing; Svesing
- Location within Germany Location within Schleswig-Holstein
- Coordinates: 54°30′N 9°8′E
- Country: Germany
- State: Schleswig-Holstein
- District: Nordfriesland
- Municipal assoc.: Viöl

Government
  - Mayor: Wolfgang Sokoll

Area
  - Total: 15.63 km^{2} (6.03 sq mi)
- Elevation: 12 m (39 ft)

Population (2025-12-31)
  - Total: 904
  - Density: 57.8/km^{2} (150/sq mi)
- Time zone: UTC+01:00 (CET)
  - Summer (DST): UTC+02:00 (CEST)
- Postal codes: 25813
- Dialling codes: 04841
- Vehicle registration: NF
- Website: www.amt-vioel.de

Schwesing (Danish: Svesing, North Frisian: Swiasing) is a municipality in the district of Nordfriesland, in Schleswig-Holstein, Germany.

== History ==
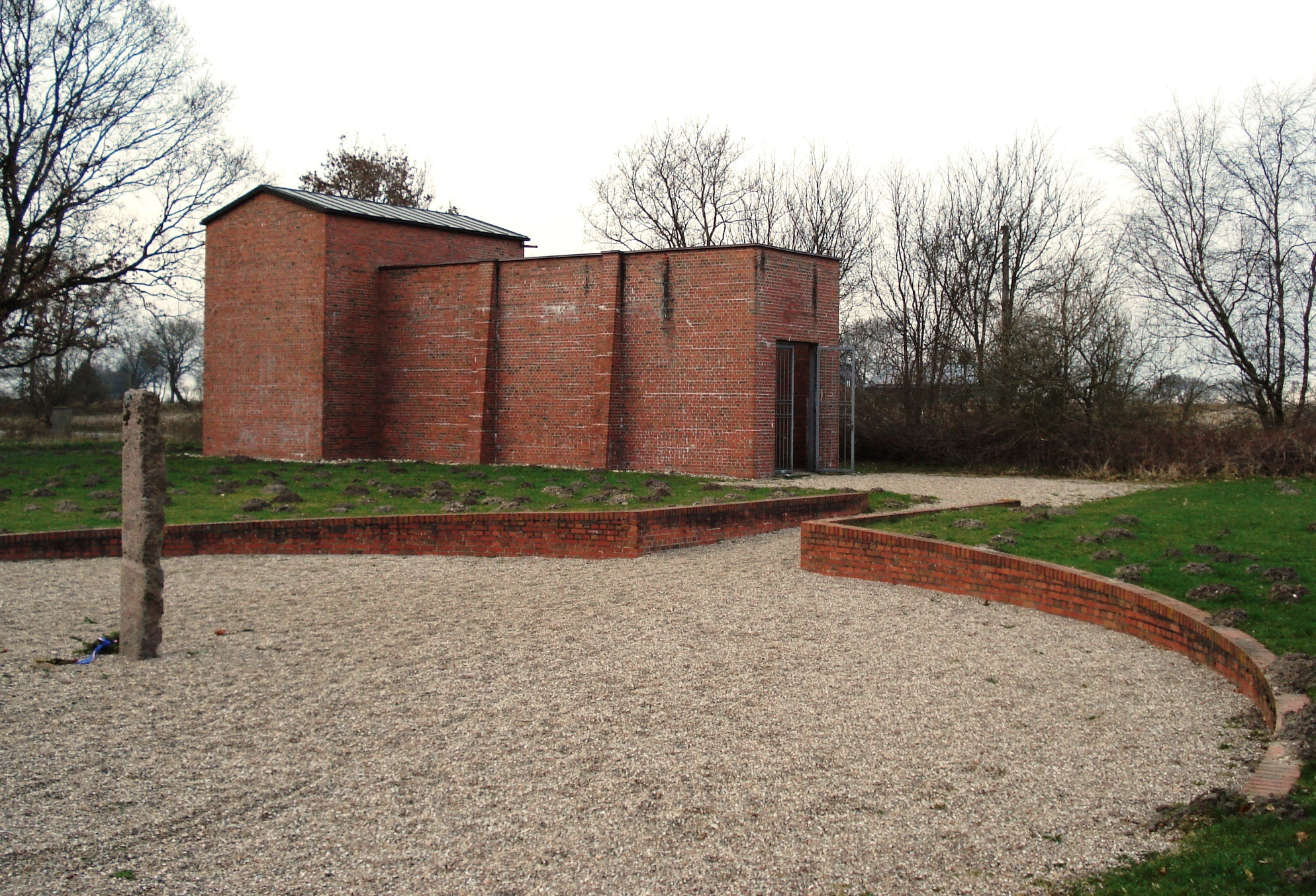
Memorial site at the concentration camp

From September 25, 1944, until December 11, 1944, a concentration camp was established near Glasau. It was a subcamp to the Neuengamme concentration camp.

== Culture ==
Schwesing is one of the few places where the old, German card game of Bruus is still played. Tournaments are held regularly in the winter months and, in 2019, the 1st Bruus International Open took place.

== See also ==
- List of subcamps of Neuengamme
