= Brus (card game) =

Four-hand card game

- Danish and Estonian version of Brusbart
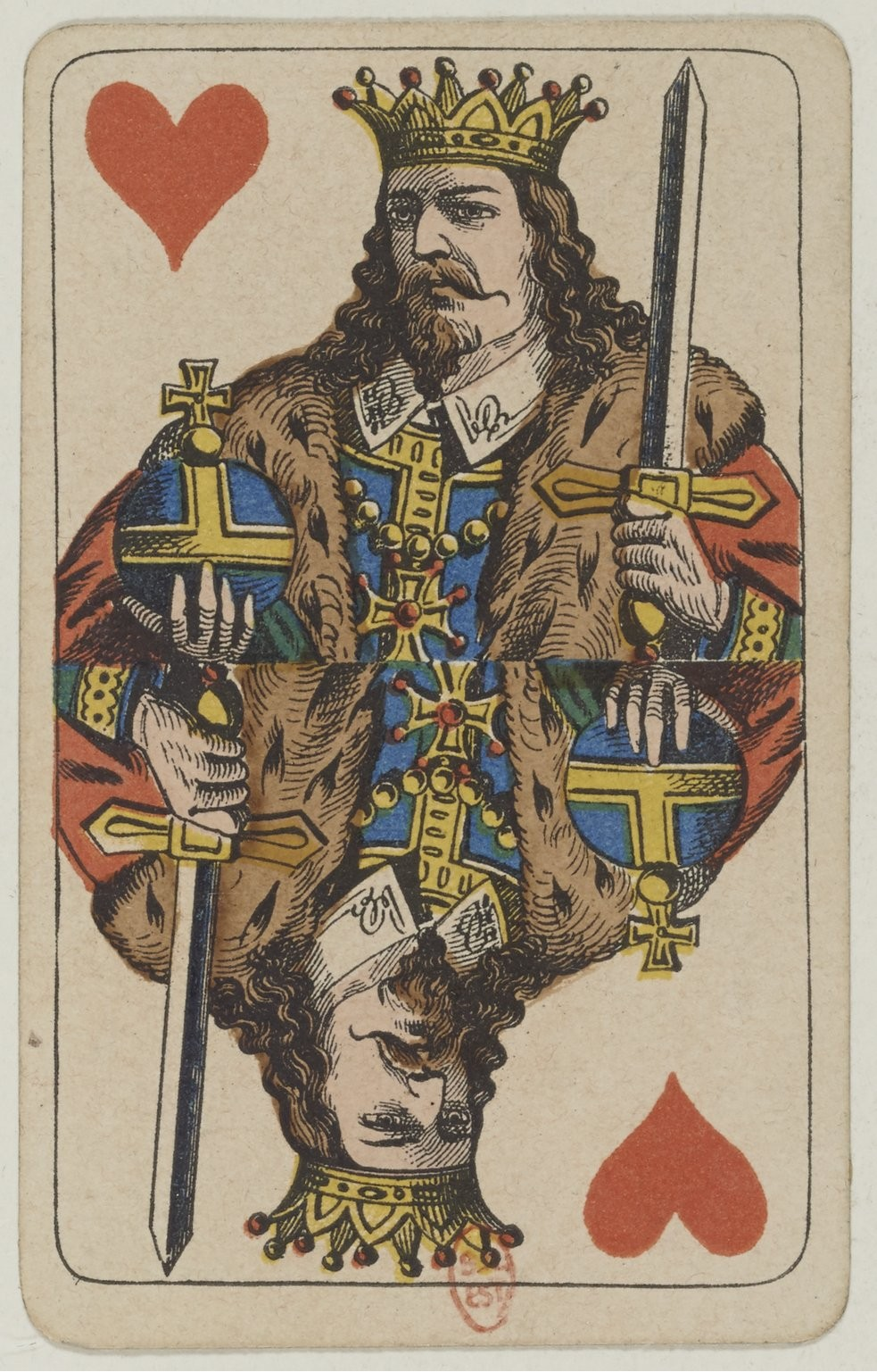
- The Brus
- Origin: North Germany
- Type: Plain-trick game
- Family: Karnöffel group
- Players: 4
- Cards: 36
- Deck: French pack
- Rank (high→low): J♣ K♥ 8♠ 9s As Js 6s Windmills: Ks Qs 8s 10s
- Play: Clockwise

Related games
- Bräus • Brús • Bruus • Drużbart • Voormsi
- Features 'chancing' and 'smacking'; double and triple tricks; K♣ (Stodderkongen) with special powers.

Brus is a four-hand card game of German descent that was once played in Denmark and Estonia. The game is descended from the oldest known card game in Europe, Karnöffel, a fact testified by its unusual card ranking and lack of a uniform trump suit.

Brus is designed for four players and is played with 36 cards of a French pack, each of the four suits comprising the cards 6-10, Jack, Queen, King and Ace.

== History ==
Brus is described as an old Jutlandish game, but its rules and terminology suggest that it is descended from the centuries-old German game of Brusbart, now known as Bruus, which was once the national game of Hamburg and which spread across most of northern Europe spawning a family of games such as Russian Bruzbart, Polish Drużbart, Swedish Bräus, Greenlandic Voormsi and others. Brusbart in turn is descended from Karnöffel, the oldest card game in Europe with a continuous tradition of play down to the present day, a fact testified to by "the wildly disturbed ranking order in the chosen suit and particularly by the special role of the chosen Seven". (Note: In terms of the card ranking and role of the Sevens in Brus, all four suits are 'chosen'.)

=== Estonian Brus ===
Swedish-speaking peoples used to live on the Estonian islands until 1944 and, in 1855, were recorded by Russwurm as playing Brus. Although the description of the rules is scanty, the matadors are those typical of the Brus family of games: K♥, 8♠ and J♣. The Sevens are called friare and the aim is to win five tricks, presumably from a total of nine.

=== Danish Brus ===
Much more detail is known of the Danish variant of Brus which was part of West Jutland's rural culture in the first half of the 19th century. For example, it is described as one of two games (Note: The other being Hundred and One.) played around Christmas time by the older folk in Skanderup in the Danish county of Ribe. It was not played for money; instead the score was chalked up, presumably on a slate or the table. The top trumps were the Spidt (Jack of Clubs), Brus (King of Hearts) and Gal Hund (Eight of Spades). The men would play cards all evening while drinking schnapps and beer and reminiscing about the Napoleonic Wars.

The rules of the Danish game are described in various sources from 1853 to 1973. It is a 36-card, 4-player game, with the same matadors as those in the Estonian game. Players received 3 hand cards and played for the best of nine tricks.

There is evidence that the game is still be being taught and played in Denmark. (Note: The rules are based on those learned during the 1950s and 1960s in Ringkøbing.) Unsurprisingly, its mechanics are very similar to its German Schleswig cousin, Bruus, played south of the border in German west Jutland.

== Rules ==
Card ranking in Brus
Matadors
J♣ K♥ 8♠
Trick cards
9♣ 9♠ 9♥ 9♦ A♣ A♠ A♥ A♦ J♠ J♥ J♦ 6♣ 6♠ 6♥ 6♦
Sevens - unbeatable when led except by K♣
7♣ 7♠ 7♥ 7♦
Windmills (worthless cards)
K♣ K♠ K♦ Q♣ Q♠ Q♥ Q♦ 10♣ 10♠ 10♥ 10♦ 8♣ 8♥ 8♦

The following rules for Danish Brus are based on Smith's reconstruction of three Danish texts dating to 1853, 1920 and 1952.

=== Cards ===
A 36-card, Danish-pattern pack is used. Cards rank as follows:

- J♣ - Spids
- K♥ - Brus
- 8♠ - Galhund or Gale Hund
- Nines
- Aces
- Jacks
- Sixes

The top three cards - Spids, Brus and Galhund - are the matadors. The Nines, Aces, Jacks and Sixes are called 'trick cards' (stikkort) and, at each rank, beat each other in suit order: ♣ ♠ ♥ and ♦. The Sevens have a special role: they are unbeatable when led to a trick, except by a Seven of a higher suit or by the K♣ – the Stodderkonge (Note: Literally "Beggar King" or "Vagabond King", the Stodderkonge was a 19th-century Danish official who was responsible for policing the vagrants, vagabonds, beggars of a district, an analogy for the way the K♣ 'sweeps up' the Sevens as if they were beggars.) or Beggar King – otherwise the Sevens are worthless and cannot beat anything. If the Beggar King is played, it can only be beaten by the K♠, nicknamed Kristian Andersen. Apart from these circumstances, neither King had any value. This was also true of the remaining cards: the other Kings, the Queens, Tens and Eights (except the Galhund). The worthless cards are 'windmills' and can never win a trick unless all four cards are windmills, in which case the led card wins.

=== Players ===
Four players form two teams of two for the session with partners sitting opposite one another. Three may also play, each playing alone.

=== Dealing ===
Players cut for the deal, lowest card deals first. Three cards are dealt clockwise to each player in one batch, starting with the dealer. The rest are placed face down on the table to form the talon.

=== Playing ===
Forehand (left of dealer) leads to the first trick; the winner of a trick leads to the next. There is no requirement to follow suit, trump or head the trick. Players may always play any card. As in other games in the family, two or three cards of the same rank may be led and all must be beaten to win the double- or triple-trick thus arising. For example, Galhund and two other Eights can only be beaten by Spids or Brus and any two trick cards. When the trick is taken, players replenish their cards in order starting with the trick winner. (Note: Comparison with the closely related Bruus suggests that this would be done in one batch.)

=== Chancing and smacking ===
A player with the Galhund or Brus may say "I'll chance it" or "I dare" as the card is played. This is only permitted, however, if a higher matador is still in play and not held by the chancer, if the talon is not exhausted, if another player has yet to play to the trick and if winning the bonus would not result in winning the rubber. The chancer scores a point unless the matador is 'smacked' by a higher card played by an opponent in which case the opposing side score two points. If the 8♠ is chanced and smacked by the K♥, but beaten in turn by the J♣, it is an 'oversmack' and worth 3 points, unless the K♥ was also chanced in which case it is worth 4 points. If a card is found to be unlawfully chanced, it is automatically smacked.

=== Scoring ===
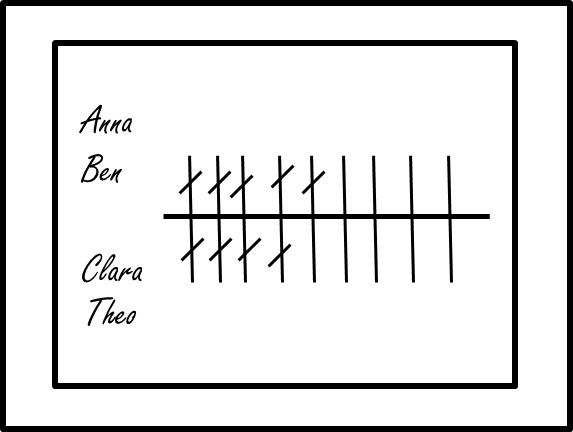
Traditional scoring system in Brus

In addition to the bonuses for chancing and smacking, the team that wins the most tricks in each deal scores a point. Two points are scored for winning the first 5 tricks i.e. winning 5–0.

To keep score, players draw a so-called 'comb', a horizontal line with vertical lines drawn across it at right angles. Each team has one half of the comb and points are scored by erasing or striking out the lines on the team's side of the comb. The first side to erase or cross off all its lines wins. Game is usually 9 points.

== Ringkøbing variant ==
In a variant originally played in Ringkøbing during the 1950s and 1960s, there are the following differences from the above rules:

- Trick cards are called 'counting cards' (Kortenes værdi), the Sevens and K♣ are 'hawks' (høge) and the windmills are just called non-beaters (Ikke-stikkere)
- The talon is called bunken
- Fives are retained and the Tens are removed.
- If a 7 is played, an opponent with the K♣ can beat it, saying "I'll hawk it", and score a bonus point.
- There is no equivalent of the K♠, Kristian Andersen
- A player with 3 cards may take over and lead to the triple trick automatically
- Game is thirteen points. A 5–0 win is called a jan but is still worth 2 points.
- At 12 points, a team may not chance because the winning point has to be for winning a deal. If a team does score a bonus point to reach 13, they receive a penalty point or 'chimney' and now have to score 14.

== Literature ==
- _ (1853). Spillebog for Børn. Copenhagen. 40 pp. Brus described on pp. 21–23.
- Dedichen, Herman, ed. (1952). Spillefuglen. pp. 121–123.
- Dummett, Michael (May 1981). "Reviews of "Der Nidwaldener Kaiserjass Und Seine Geschichte" and "Der Kaiserjass, Wie Er Heute in Nidwalden Gespielt Wird"". The Playing Card. 9 (4).
- Feilberg, Henning Frederik (1899). Dansk bondeliv, saaledes som det i mands minde førtes, navnlig i Vestjylland. Vol. 1. G.E.C. Gad.
- Korsgaard, Otto (1923). "Folkeliv in Skanderup Sogn". Fra Ribe amt. 6. Historisk samfund for Ribe amt.
- McLeod, John (1996). "Styrivolt, Vorms and Cicera". The Playing Card. 25 (2).
- 'Per David' (pseudonym of Sv. Frederiksen) (1920), Reglerne for 52 gamle Spil, Copenhagen. Brus described on pp. 19–24.
- Smith, Anthony (1997). George Beal (ed.). "Voormsi: A Greenlandic descendant of Karnöffel". The Playing-Card. 26 (2). The International Playing-Card Society. ISSN 0305-2133.
