= Karnöffel =

Historical card game

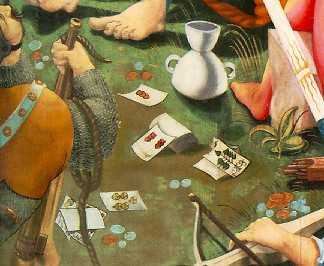
- Detail from the Herrenberg Altarpiece: Landsknechts probably playing Karnöffel
- Origin: Germany
- Type: Plain-trick
- Players: 4
- Cards: 48
- Deck: German
- Rank (high→low): U (7) 6 D 3 4 5 (chosen); K O U X 9 8 7 6 5 4 3 D (side)
- Play: Clockwise

Related games
- Alkort • Kaiserspiel • Karniffel • Knüffeln • Styrivolt • Treikort

Karnöffel is a trick-taking card game which probably came from the upper-German language area in Europe in the first quarter of the 15th century. It first appeared listed in a municipal ordinance of Nördlingen, Bavaria, in 1426 among the games that could be lawfully played at the annual city fête. This makes the game the oldest identifiable European card game in the history of playing cards with a continuous tradition of play down to the present day.

== History ==
The earliest substantial reference to Karnöffel is a poem by Meissner, written in or before 1450. Historically karnöffeln meant "to cudgel, thrash or flog", but in medieval times, a Karnöffel was also the word for an inguinal hernia.

Karnöffel had a suit, the 'chosen suit', in which some cards had a higher priority than cards in other suits, which indicates that it might be a possible precursor to the trump suit of Tarot. The earliest forms of Karnöffel utilized a deck of 48 cards, Aces having been removed from German and Swiss playing cards during the 14th or early 15th century.

== Descendants ==
Karnöffel has a number of descendants that are still played today including Swiss Kaisern or Kaiserjass, Schleswigian Knüffeln and Bruus, Danish Brus, Icelandic Brús, Gotlandic Bräus, Midwestern Euchre, and Greenlandic Voormsi.

== Rules ==
There is no detailed record of the early rules for Karnöffel. It is known that it was played with a 48-card, German-suited pack, that there was one chosen suit and that the cards of the chosen suit probably ranked as follows: U, 6, D, 3, 4 and 5. The chosen Six was known as the Pope, the Unter as the Karnöffel and the other beaters of the chosen suit were Emperors (Kaiser). The chosen 7 was the Devil and had no value except when led.

By the late 18th century, there was a 36-card variant of Karnöffel. 36- and 48-card variants are still played today.

The rules here are taken from a reconstruction by von Leyden and Dummett, based on von Leyden's discovery of the little-known Swiss game of Kaisern or Kaiserspiel which appeared to have similar characteristics to the original Karnöffel.

=== Players ===
Karnöffel was played by four players in two teams of two. The partners sat opposite one another.

=== Cards ===
There was one chosen suit. In the unchosen suits, the card ranking was as follows:

King, Ober, Unter, Banner, 9, 8, 7, 6, 5, 4, 3, 2 (Deuce)

=== Card powers ===
No.	*	Card	Description	Name	Translation
1	T	Trump Unter	beats all cards	Karnöffel	
(2)	T	Trump 7	beats all cards apart from the Karnöffel, but only if led to a trick. In all other circumstances it is only a 7. It may not be played to the first trick.	Teufel, Böse 7	Devil, Evil/Bad/Naughty 7
3	T	Trump 6	beats all other cards apart from the aforementioned two.	Papst	Pope
4	T	Trump Deuce	beats all other cards apart from the aforementioned three.	Kaiser, Hochkönig	Emperor, High King
The Karnöffel, Papst and Kaiser are also known as King-beaters (Königstecher), because they are the only ones that can beat a King.
5		Kings		König	King
6	T	Trump 3	beats all other cards apart from the aforementioned trumps and the Kings.	Oberstecher, Barde	Ober-beater, Bard
7		Obers			
8	T	Trump 4	beats all other cards apart from the aforementioned trumps and King and Ober.	Understecher, Herzog	Unter-beater, Duke
7		Unters			
8	T	Trump 5	beats all other cards apart from the aforementioned trumps and King, Ober and Unter.	Farbstecher, Ritter	Suit-beater, Knight
The King, Ober, Banner, 9 and 8 of the trump suit have no trump powers.

=== Play ===
- The first dealer deals 5 cards to each player, one at a time. The first card is placed face up in front of the respective player, the remaining four cards stay face down.
- The lowest of the face up cards determines the trump suit for this deal. If 2 cards have the same rank, the first to be dealt decides the trump suit. Thereafter the players pick their cards up.
- The player left of the dealer leads to the first trick. The other players play in clockwise order.
- There is no requirement to follow suit. The player with the highest card of the led suit or the highest trump wins the trick and leads to the next.
- This continues until one team has taken three tricks and so won the deal.
- Players may talk to one another during the game. Mutual support is actually encouraged.
- The player who led to the first trick becomes the next dealer.

== Literature ==
- Dummett, Michael (1978). Reviews of "Der Nidwaldener Kaiserjass Und Seine Geschichte" and "Der Kaiserjass, Wie Er Heute in Nidwalden Gespielt Wird" in The Playing Card, Vol. 9, No. 4, May 1981.
- Dummett, Michael (1980). The Game of Tarot. Duckworth, London. ISBN 0715610147
- Parlett, David (2020). "Karnöffel". Historic Card Games.
