= Kaiserspiel =

Swiss card game

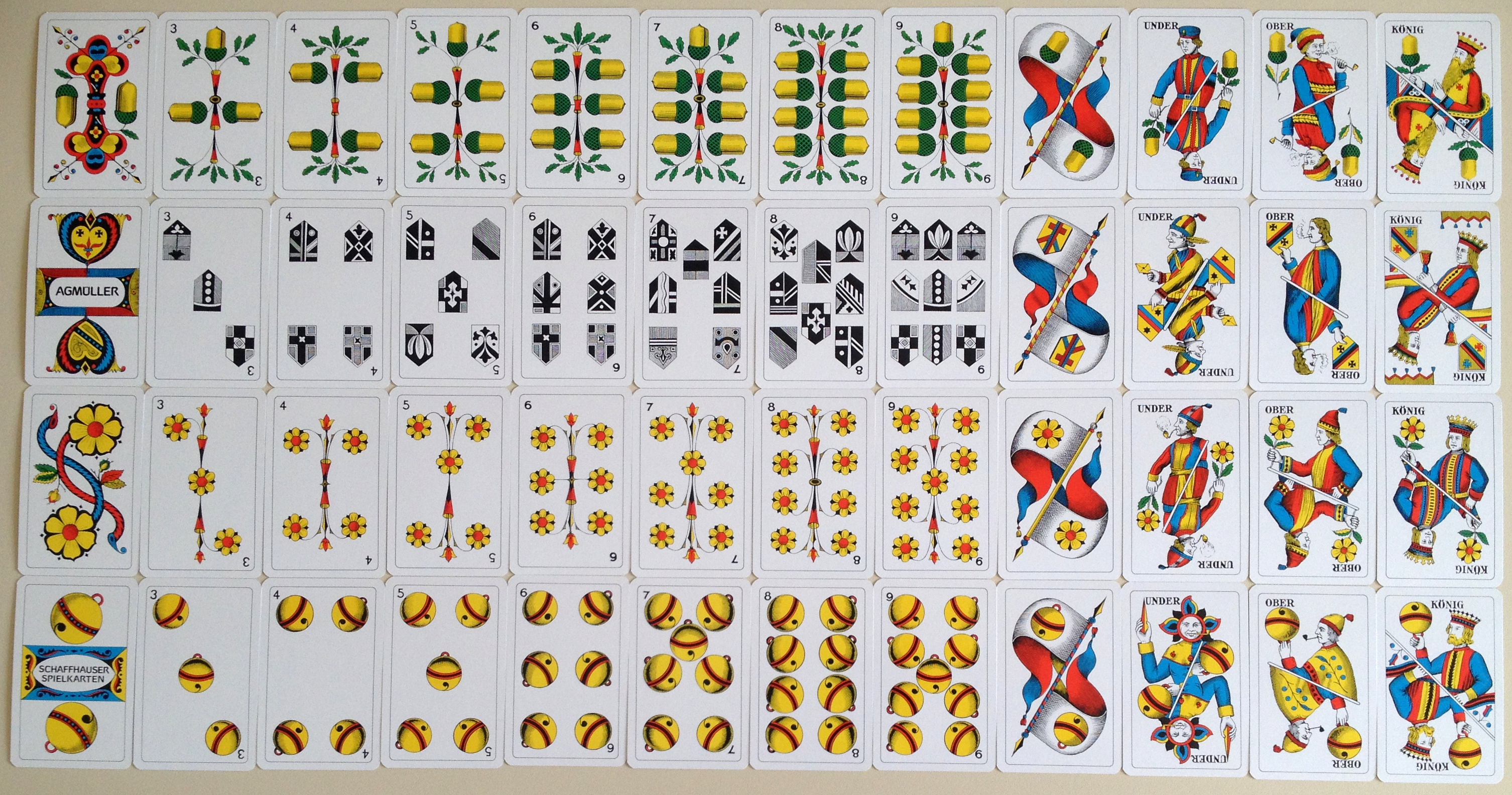
- The card deck for Kaiserspiel
- Origin: Switzerland
- Type: Trick-taking
- Players: 2, 4, 6
- Cards: 40 or 48
- Deck: Swiss deck (Kaiserspiel variant)
- Play: Anticlockwise

Related games
- Karnöffel • Knüffeln • Watten
- One chosen suit

Kaiserspiel, also called Kaisern or Cheisärä, is a card game, usually for 4 or 6 players, that is played in parts of Switzerland using a variant of the standard pack of Swiss playing cards with 40 or 48 cards. It is a descendant of Karnöffel, one of the oldest card games known. It is sometimes misleadingly called Kaiserjass, although it has nothing to do with the Jass family of games popular in Switzerland.

== Cards ==
The Kaiserspiel pack comprises four suits: Shields, Flowers, Bells and Acorns, each of ten cards ranked: King, Ober, Unter, Banner, (9), (8), 7, 6, 5, 4, 3, 2 (Deuce). The four Banners are normally part of the trump suit and are known as Kaisers, hence the name of the game. In the 40-card variants, the 8s and 9s are removed. There are no aces.

== The game ==
Kaiserspiel is a trick-taking game.
