= Bruus =

German card game

- Once Hamburg's national game
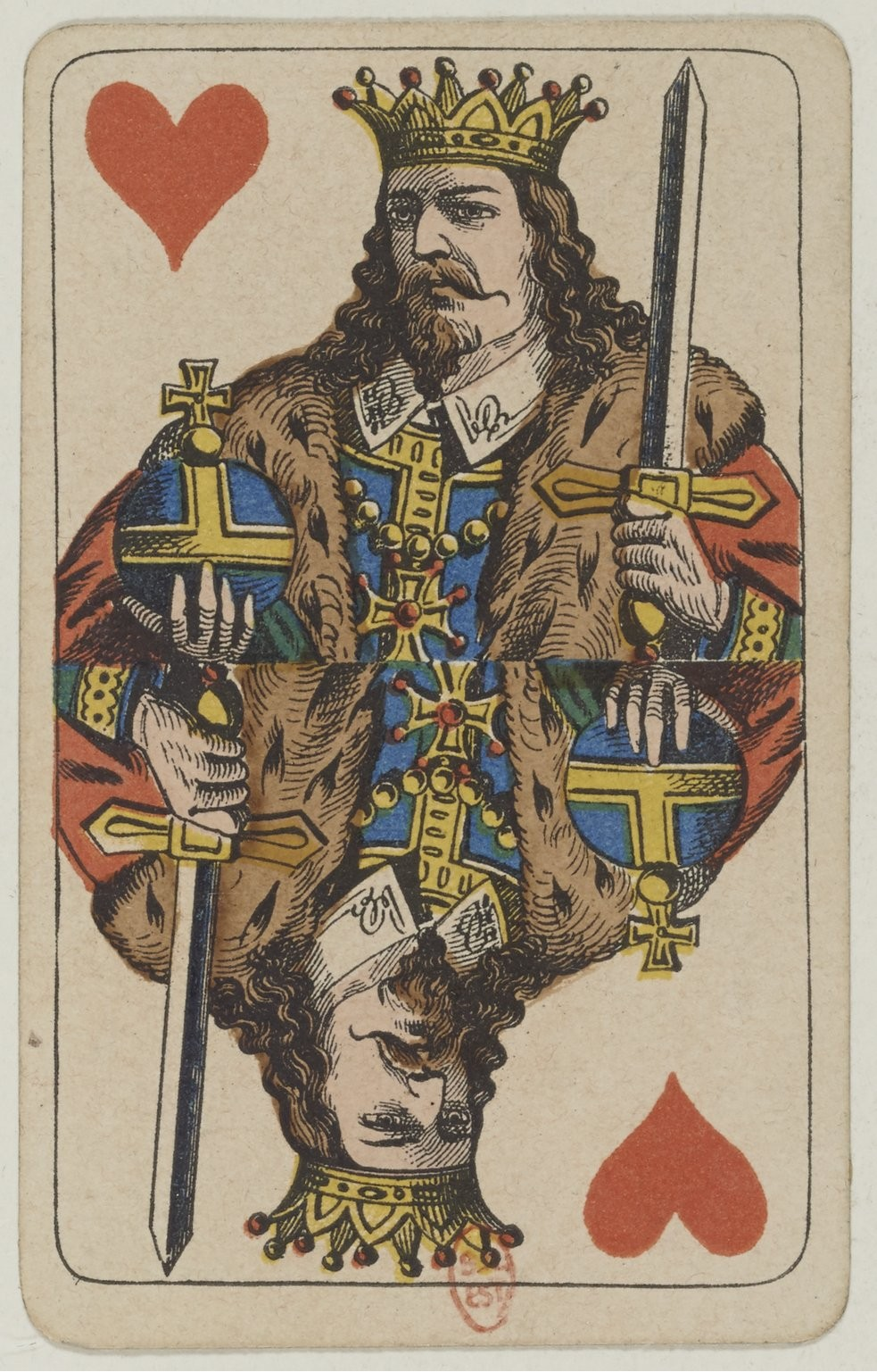
- The eponymous Bruus
- Origin: North Germany
- Type: Plain-trick game
- Family: Karnöffel group
- Players: 4 or 6 (4 best)
- Cards: 32 or 36
- Deck: French pack
- Rank (high→low): ♣J ♥K ♠8 9 A J 7s & 'duds' (K Q 10)
- Play: Clockwise

Related games
- Bräus • Brus • Brús • Drużbart • Voormsi
- Features 'daring' and 'tormenting'; double and triple tricks; Sevens with special powers.

Bruus, formerly Brausebart or Brusbart, is a north German card game for four players in two teams of two. It was once highly popular but has since died out except for a few pockets in the state of Schleswig-Holstein. As Brusbart, it was the ancestor of a family of similar games in northern Europe, including Swedish Bräus and Danish Brus which are still played today. Bruus features 'daring and tormenting' which has been said to give the game a certain charm. Once considered the national game of Hamburg, Bruus is a descendant of Karnöffel, the oldest identifiable European card game in the history of playing cards with a continuous tradition of play down to the present day. The game is named after the Bruus or Brusbart, once its top card, but now its second-highest trump.

== History ==
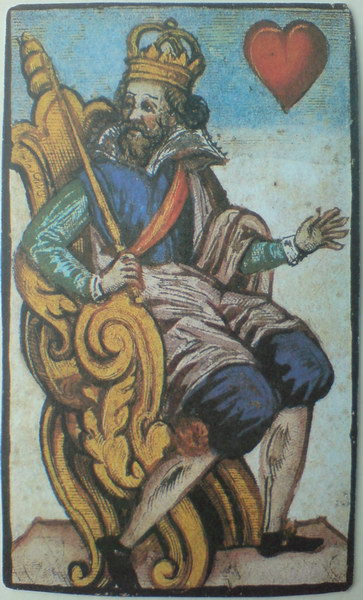
The bearded Brusbart

The game of Brusbart or Brausebart goes back at least to the first half of the 18th century, Amelung even suggesting that this "old German game" may have emerged as early as 1650. By the mid-18th century it had spread to most of northern mainland Europe, including Poland, Livonia and Russia. Earliest references to the game, appear in the 1770s, by when it was familiar enough for a character in a north German stage play to announce that "my leevtes Spill is Bruusbaart” ("my favourite game is Brusbart"). The game contains a number of features that clearly point to its being a descendant of Karnöffel, Europe's oldest card game with a continuous tradition of play down to the present day. These include the wild ranking of the cards, the unusual powers of the Sevens and, historically, the use of signalling between partners using gestures, known as winken.

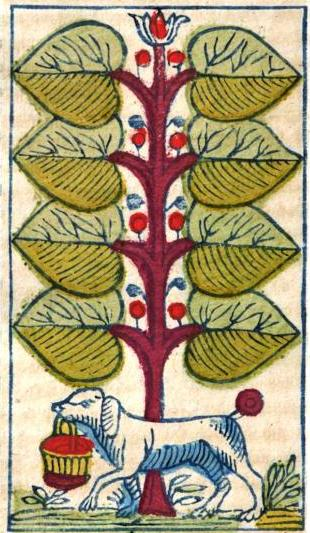
An Eight of Leaves depicting a dog. From a Schwerterkarte c. 1830.

Around 1800, "Bruus'baart" was the best known card game in the north German city port of Hamburg, so much so that it was described in 1804 as "Hamburg's national game" and a song was written in honour of it that conveys something of the rowdy atmosphere of the game and confirms that signalling was an integral part of it. In the 1830s and 1840s it was played in the town of Schleswig and in the 1870s in Eckernförde. It is also recorded in Bergedorf and the state of Mecklenburg.

The game faded quickly, being described in 1865 as a "formerly" very popular game among the lower classes, and, by 1900, it was virtually forgotten in Hamburg. Nevertheless, it clung on in the north, being recorded in 1911 in the Anglian peninsula, at Wallsbüll near Flensburg and also in central Schleswig along the Danish-German language boundary. By 1927, it was thought to be extinct having once been "very popular through Schleswig (specifically in Anglia)" and also played in Holstein in Dithmarschen, Hademarschen and Hohenwestedt. It had been especially popular with women.

The name of the game appears to have come from the nickname for the King of Hearts (illustrated) which was top card until the 19th century when it was gradually overtaken by the Spitz, the Jack of Clubs. The name 'Brusbart' means "shaggy beard" and may be derived from early German-suited playing cards where the King of Hearts was the only King with a bushy beard. The Spitz was also called Spitzkopf. The Toller Hund means "mad dog" and may likewise be derived from the depiction of a dog on the Eight of Leaves in such cards. The Low German word bruusen meant 'to play Brusbart' and appears as early as 1800 both as a verb and as a noun (se speelt bruusen). Nevertheless, the name Brusbart, variously spelt, continued to hold sway until the second decade of the 20th century when it was finally superseded by the term Bruus.

Today the game is still played are in Schleswig in the region east of the port of Husum, in the villages of Schwesing, Treia and nearby Oster-Ohrstedt. Regular Bruus tournaments are held during the winter months in Schwesing and Oster-Ohrstedt. In March 2020, an 'International Open' tournament was held in Schwesing, in which an English player was placed second.

== Related games ==
The original game of Brusbart developed into a family of closely related games as it spread across Europe. These include the historical games of Estonian Brus, Livonian Brusbart, Russian Bruzbart or Dulya and Polish Drużbart, as well as the games of Danish Brus, Swedish Bräus, Icelandic Brús, Greenlandic Voormsi and Bruus itself, which have survived into the 21st century. More distant cousins include Faroese Stýrivolt and Schleswig Knüffeln.

== Rules ==
The rules have changed over the years with new features being added, such as double and triple tricks, but the old signalling scheme and lively communication between partners, including bluffing and blustering, has gone. The latter very much features in the Brausebart song of 1800, which is the earliest description of play and was interpreted by Feit in 1907.

The following gives an outline of the earliest known rules from 1885, followed by early 20th century and modern rules as played in Schwesing and Treia.

== Brusbart (1885) ==
The earliest rule set is recorded by Zahn in 1885 in the Korrespondenzblatt des Vereins für niederdeutsche Sprachforschung (Magazine of the Society for Low German Language Research). We are told that "Brusbart" was a game played among four players in two teams of two with the partners sitting opposite one another. Signalling, known as winken (the same term used in the game of Gaigel) is recorded as late as 1865, but appears to have dropped out by this point and there is no mention, yet, of double and triple tricks. The King of Hearts, Brusbart, reported as being the highest card as late as 1860, has now fallen to second place.

=== Cards ===
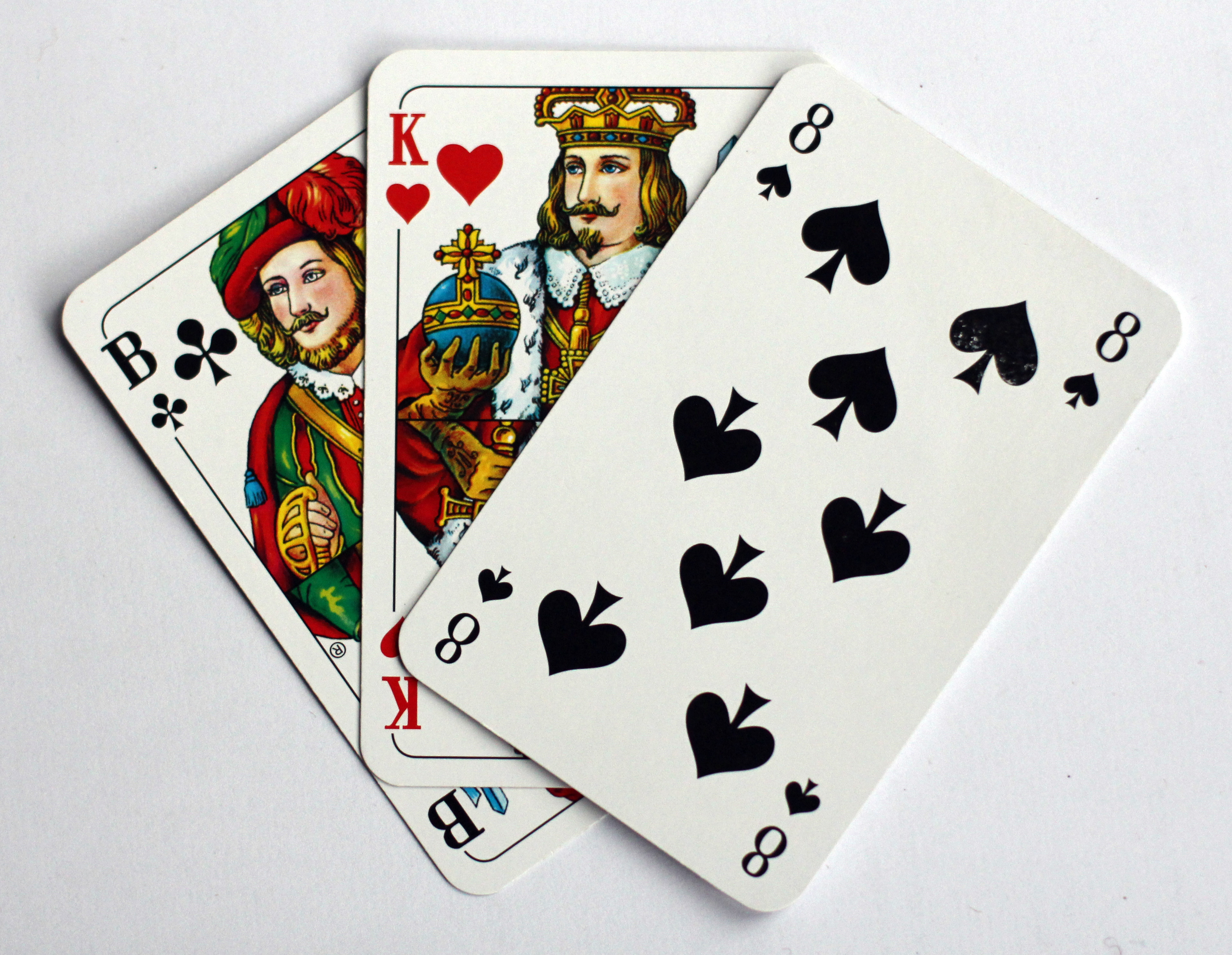
The three top trumps in Bruus

A French-suited pack of 36 cards is employed. The aim is to win the majority of the nine tricks. There are three matadors (Note: Matador is shorthand for 'permanent top trump'. The sources do not use this term.) which are (highest first):

♣J, known as Spitzkopf or Spitze ("rascal" or "point")
♥K known as Brusbart or Brus ("shaggy beard" or "old grumpy")
♠8 known as Toller Hund ("mad dog")

Next come the remaining beaters (Wertkarten, lit. valuable cards) which beat each other in rank and then suit order as follows:

♣9 ♠9 ♥9 ♦9
♣A ♠A ♥A ♦A
♣6 ♠6 ♥6 ♦6

Thus the ♥A beats the ♦A and any Sixes, but is beaten by any Nine and by the ♣A and ♠A. With the exception of the matadors, the remaining cards (Eights, Tens, Jacks, Queens and Kings) are duds (wertlose Karten) and have no power except among cards of the same rank, where they beat each other in suit order. So, for example, a led ♦8 may be beaten by the ♣8 or ♥8, but not by any other dud.

Sevens are free cards when led, i.e. they are unbeatable by any other card, even another Seven. Otherwise they are duds i.e. a Seven played by second, third or fourth hand is worthless.

=== Play ===
Players are dealt three cards each and the rest are placed face down to form the stock (Haufen). It is likely that play is clockwise and that forehand leads to the first trick, but Zahn is silent on these points. He does confirm that the trick winner leads to the next, and that players replenish their hands after each trick, the trick winner taking the top card from the Haufen and the others following in turn.

Daring and whacking

A player who has the Toller Hund, may play it, saying "I dare" (ich wage), and the team earn a bonus if the dare is successful i.e. it is not beaten by Brusbart, but concede a bonus if it is 'whacked' (gekloppt) by Brusbart. Likewise Brusbart may be dared and is successful if not whacked by Spitzkopf. Daring is only legal if a) the next higher card has not already been played, b) the darer does not hold it, c) the darer is not fourth hand (i.e. last to play to the trick) and d) the Haufen is not exhausted.

=== Scoring ===
Scoring is recorded in the traditional way by chalking tally marks in the form of lines or strokes (Striche) on a slate. A team that takes at least five tricks chalks up 1 line. If they win the first five in a row, this is a jann and their opponents are 'licked' or 'thrashed' (gejaunt or gejannt) and the winners score 2 lines. A successful dare of the Toller Hund is worth 1 line and of Brusbart is worth 2 lines. If a dare fails, Zahn merely says that the points "naturally fall to the other team". Game is eight lines and the first to record that collects the winnings, either in money, Boltjes ("sweets") or the like.

== Bruus (1911) ==
In 1911, a certain E. Schnack from the Anglian region of north Germany published an account of the game, now called Bruus for the first time. Apart from some different terminology, the main changes are that the Jacks replace the Sixes as beaters and that double and triple tricks are introduced for the first time. In his account, he describes the culture surrounding the game in rural Anglia. The villagers in the local dairy cooperative gather at their local pub where the "dairy money" is paid out. They stay on and chat and then eventually turn to playing Bruus. The landlord hands out a pack of cards, a slate and chalk.

=== Cards ===
Schnack gives the nicknames of the matadors as Spitz ("top"), Bruus ("grumbler") and Duller Hund ("mad dog"). (Note: Duller or Doller are the Low German equivalent of Toller, which means "mad" in this context.) The remaining beaters are the same as before, except that the Jacks now rank immediately below the Aces and the Sixes are not mentioned at all. So either the Sixes are worthless duds or there are only 32 cards in the pack. (Note: The fact that a team winning 5–0 scores double suggests there are nine tricks and thus 36 cards, but Schnack also says the first team to take 4 tricks wins which implies only eight tricks and 32 cards.) The duds are known as 'Fosi' (Fosen, an historical Germanic tribe in the area of Lower Saxony) and now have no trick-taking power whatsoever, even among cards of the same rank. Meanwhile, the Sevens retain their unbeatability when led, but may now beat one another in the usual suit order: Clubs, Spades, Hearts and Diamonds.

=== Preliminaries ===
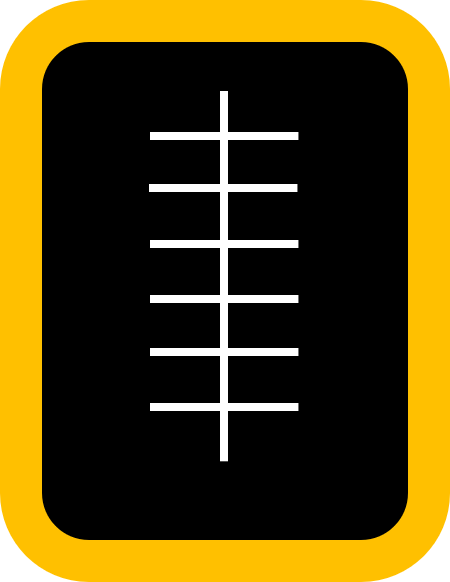
Bruus scoring slate

Players decide who will partner whom and the partners (Magger) in each team sit opposite one another. One player is nominated as the scribe and chalks up a 'ladder' on a slate consisting of six horizontal lines (Striche) divided in half by a vertical line. Each half represents the six lines that a team aims to erase first. The dealer now deals 3 cards, one by one, to each player and places the rest down as a Block (stock) in the middle of the table.

=== Play ===
Any card may be led to a trick and players may also follow with any card. The highest card wins the trick and the trick winner leads to the next. Beginning with the trick winner, players replenish their cards by drawing from the stock as many as they played to the trick.

Double and triple tricks

For the first time, a player may also lead two or three cards to a trick provided they are of the same rank e.g. two Aces or three Kings.

Daring and tormenting

As before, the three matadors have a special role in daring and 'tormenting', as it is now called: Bruus and Duller Hund may be 'dared' (gewagt), while Spitz and Bruus may 'torment' (plagen). Teams erase one line for a successful dare; two lines for a successful torment. Schnack says that up to four lines may be erased if the three cards are suitably distributed. (Note: This suggest a 'daring and striking' scoring scheme very much like the modern day game.) Schnack tells us that "it is this 'daring and tormenting' in particular that... gives the game a certain charm."

=== Scoring ===
Players combine their scores. The first team to take five tricks (Note: Schnack actually says "four tricks" but then talks about a team winning 5–0. That suggests he meant to say "five tricks".) wins the deal and erases a line. If they take five tricks before their opponents get one, they may erase two lines. The first team to erase six lines wins the round and their opponents score a blob (Null) on the slate. Once a team has four blobs, the slate is wiped clean, the losers pay for the next round and scoring starts again.

== Mensing (1927) ==
Mensing's Schleswig-Holstein dictionary of 1927 gives a passable description of Bruus. The usual matadors are called the Spitz, Bruus or Bruusbart and the Doll Hund. The game is normally played with 36 cards, but an option with 32 cards is mentioned. The beaters rank 9–A–J–6, Jacks being implied, and presumably the 32-card game lacked any 6s. The Sevens are as in Schnack. The stock is called the barg and the four suits are called, in the Low German dialect, Klewer, Piek, Harten and Ruten.

The game was mostly played for fun, not money. Scoring used a ladder with eight rungs or comb with 8 prongs and chalked on the table; a line (prong or rung) being erased for each point. In Eiderstedt, they drew a cat's head, line-by-line, on the table. Daring was announced with e.g. "Bruus dares" (Bruus waag!) or "I'll dare him" (ik waag em) and striking with e.g. "Spitz strikes!" (Spitz slaag!) or "I'll strike him" (ik slaag em). The team that had been struck had "a pair of spectacles" (de Brill) and the opponent erased two lines. A successful dare entitled one line to be erased. Daring the Dullhund [sic] was not universal, but permitted in "some areas".

If one team was 'licked' (gejannt) by losing 5–0 in tricks, this entitled three lines to be erased (as opposed to the usual two). If, when playing with 32 cards, a draw (bock) resulted (4 tricks apiece), a point was carried forward to the next game.

== Bruus (2020) ==
Schwesing, a small village near the North Sea fishing port of Husum, holds regular Bruus tournaments during the winter months. The game is usually played by four, but the rules mention the possibility of six players without, however, clarifying the changes needed to accommodate the extra players. There are always two teams and 36 cards are used (from Ace down to Six). Players agree who is to shuffle and deal first.

=== Cards ===
The matadors are called Spitz, Bruus and Toller Hund, but this time the beaters include both Jacks and Sixes as well as Nines and Aces. (Note: In Oster-Ohrstedt the Toller Hund is the Dulle.) Thus the cards rank as follows:

Card ranking in Bruus
Matadors (Note: In Schwesing they are just called the highest trumps.)
♣J ♥K ♠8
Beaters (Note: In Schwesing just called trumps even though this is technically incorrect.)
♣9 ♠9 ♥9 ♦9 ♣A ♠A ♥A ♦A ♠J ♥J ♦J ♣6 ♠6 ♥6 ♦6
Free cards
♣7 ♠7 ♥7 ♦7
Duds
♣K ♠K ♦K ♣Q ♠Q ♥Q ♦Q ♣10 ♠10 ♥10 ♦10 ♣8 ♥8 ♦8

The duds (Luschen) are worthless and have no ranking among themselves. Thus a dud which is led to a trick can only be beaten by a counter (i.e. at least ♦6), not by any other dud. The Sevens follow the 1885 rules, being unbeatable when led, except by a Seven of a higher suit, but otherwise worthless.

=== Play ===
Deal and play are clockwise. Each player is dealt three cards, either individually or en bloc, the dealer receiving cards last. The cutter must examine the cut card and show it to the dealer; the dealer must complete the cut and examine the bottom card, showing it likewise to the cutter. If either card is a matador, the cards are reshuffled. Forehand (left of dealer) leads any card and subsequent players may, in turn, also play a card of their choice. Suit does not have to be followed. The highest card wins the trick and the trick winner draws a new card from the Stapel (stock), the other players replenishing their cards likewise and in turn. The trick winner leads to the next trick.

Double and triple tricks

If a player has two cards of the same value (2 x A, 2 x Q, etc.) they may be simultaneously led. A subsequent player must beat both in order to win the double trick, albeit not necessarily with cards of the same rank. If only one card can be beaten, it does not count. If a player has three equal-ranking cards, all three may be led even if the player is not on lead. Supposing, for example, Anne wins a trick and is on lead, but Berti now has three 9s, Berti takes over the right to lead to the trick and plays his three cards. Unless another player can beat each 9 separately (which can only be done with the three matadors), Berti wins the triple trick. Beginning with the trick winner, players replenish their hands as many cards as were played i.e. the winner of a double trick draws the top 2 cards from the stock, followed by the others in turn. If there are not enough cards to do this, the players only take their share of the remaining stock.

Daring and striking

The feature of 'daring and tormenting' has been retained, but is now called 'daring and striking'. Only the Toller Hund and the Bruus may be dared (wagt). The Toller can be only be 'struck' (geschlagen) by Bruus and Bruus can only be struck by Spitz. Of course, if the Toller is dared, the trick can be won Spitz, but this is not considered a strike and so the dare stands. If the Toller is struck by Bruus, Bruus may be dared at the same time; this is known as schlagen und weiter wagen ("strike and dare onwards"). If Bruus is dared onwards and struck by Spitz, this is a 'counterstrike' (Generalschlag). Daring and striking are valid even if a Seven is led, but of course the trick is won by the Seven. Daring and striking are also possible in a double or triple trick and are scored regardless of who wins the trick. The usual rules apply i.e. daring is only allowed if:

- There is still a stock
- The next higher trump has not been played
- The darer doesn't have the next higher trump in hand
- There is at least one player (opponent) to follow

Likewise striking or counterstriking is only possible:

- With the next higher card
- By an opponent

=== Scoring ===
Each team aims to be first to take five tricks, each trick always comprising four cards. One player on each team collects the tricks for that team. Matchsticks are used for points, each team receiving one matchstick per point. Scoring is as follows:

- Winning with five tricks – 1
- Winning with five tricks to nil – 2
- Successful dare of ♠8 or ♥K – 1
- Successful strike of ♠8 by ♥K or of ♥K by ♣J – 2
- Successful strike of ♠8 by ♥K and onward dare of ♥K – 3
- Successful counterstrike of ♥K by ♣J after ♥K has been dared onwards – 4

Game is 12 matchsticks, even if this is achieved in the middle of a game by daring or striking.

== Bruus (2020) - Treia variant ==
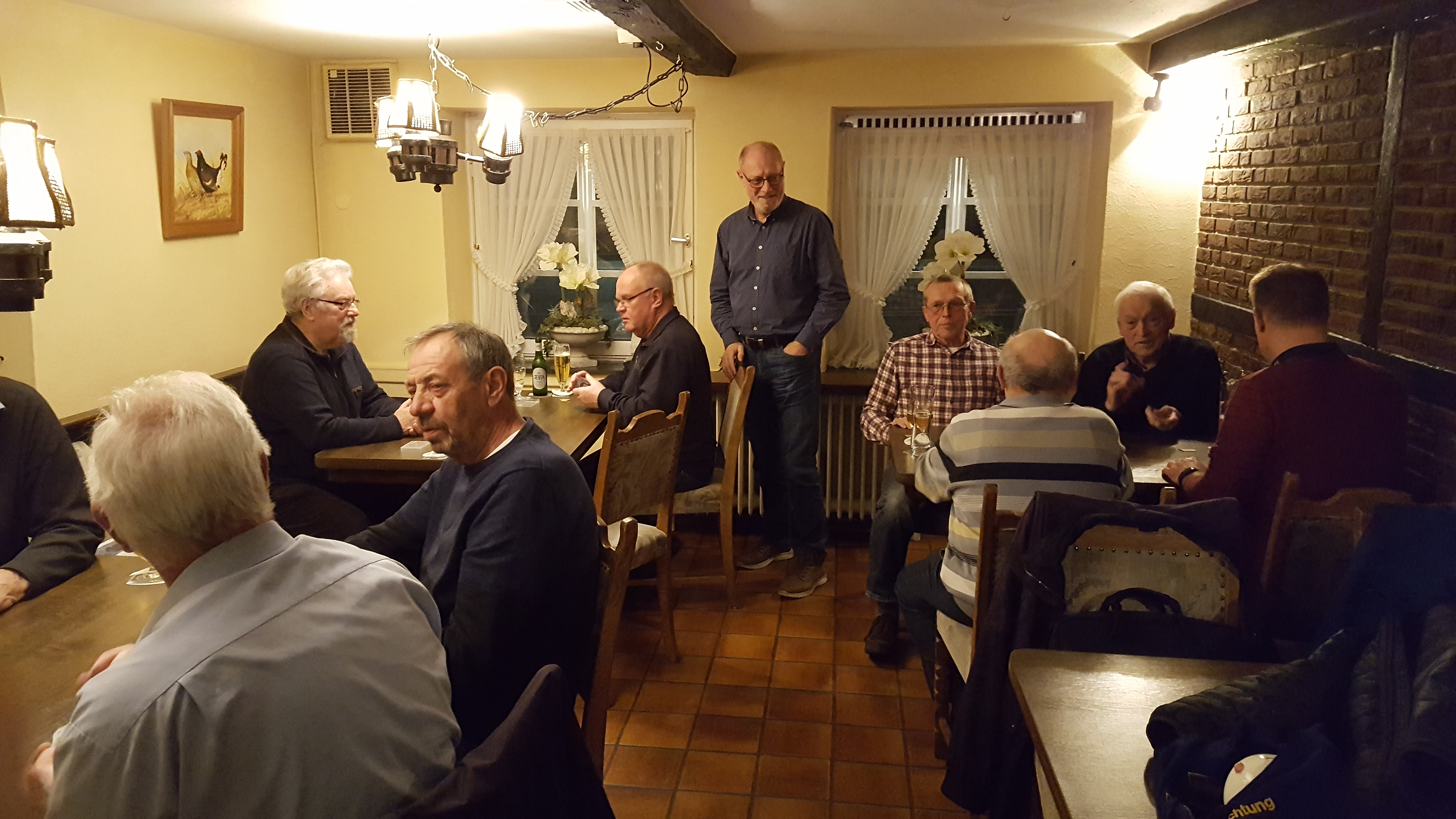
Men of the Treia male voice choir at Bruus after choir practice (March 2020).

The Männergesangverein "Frohsinn" von 1881, a male voice choir in Treia in German Schleswig, who had played Bruus after choir practice since their formation in 1881, used slightly different rules from those employed in Schwesing. A 32-card Skat pack was used which meant that there were no Sixes and only eight tricks per deal. The duds were known as Schiet or Schietkarten (worthless or 'rubbish' cards) and the stock was called the Bunk. (Note: In the Oster-Ohrstedt rules the stock is the Bunker.) Cards were always dealt in one packet of three. If both teams took four tricks, it was a Bock and the point was carried forward to the next deal. Matchsticks were used to keep score; teams started with ten and one was discarded for each point won.

There were certain rituals, the infringement of which incurred a penalty. For example, the cutter had to examine the bottom card of the cut and show it to an opponent; the dealer had to look at the bottom of the pack and show it to an opponent. If either card turned out to be a matador, the pack was reshuffled. If either forgot to check, the cards were reshuffled and the infringer had to buy a round of schnaps. If a team won 10 points while their opponents scored nil or their score was only made up of bonuses for daring and striking, the winning team won double.

After their final public performance in St. Nicholas Church, Treia, on 27 November 2022, the choir was disbanded due to a lack of younger members.

== Sources ==
- _ (1800). Neues gesellschafliches Liederbuch. 4 volumes. Hamburg: H. C. Zimmer.
- _ (1804). "Mosje Christians Briefe über Hamburg", 2nd letter, in Hamburg und Altona, Vol. III-1.
- _ (1907). Korrespondenzblatt des Vereins für niederdeutsche Sprachforschung, Volumes 28–33. Hamburg.
- _ (1961). Jahrbuch des Vereins für niederdeutsche Sprachforschung, Volumes 84–87. Verein für niederdeutsche Sprachforschung, Hamburg.
- Amelung, F. (1906). "Karten" in Düna-Zeitung No. 131, 19th Year, 1906. 10 (23) June.
- Detlefsen, U. (2020). Die Bruus-Spielregeln. Rules of the game for the Männergesangverein "Frohsinn" von 1881 e.V. as at 2020.
- Dummett, Michael (1978). Reviews of "Der Nidwaldener Kaiserjass Und Seine Geschichte" and "Der Kaiserjass, Wie Er Heute in Nidwalden Gespielt Wird" in The Playing Card, Vol. 9, No. 4, May 1981.
- Eaton, Paul (2019). "Bruus: the Karnöffel of Schleswig. Part 1" in The Playing-Card, the Journal of the International Playing-Card Society, Vol. 48, No. 2, Oct–Dec 2019, pp. 61–67.
- Eaton, Paul (2020). "Bruus: the Karnöffel of Schleswig. Part 2" in The Playing-Card, the Journal of the International Playing-Card Society, Vol. 48, No. 4, Apr–Jun 2020, pp. 126–133.
- Feit, P. (1907). "Erklärung des Brausbartlieds (XXVIII, 23)." In Korrespondenzblatt des Vereins für Niederdeutsche Sprachforschung. Vol. 28. Soltau, Hamburg, Norden and Leipzig: Diedr.
- Frischbier, Hermann (1865). Preußische Sprichwörter und volksthümliche Redensarten, Volume 1. Adolph Enslin, Berlin.
- Gaederk, Karl Theodor (2011). Das niederdeutsche Schauspiel. Vol. 1: Drama. Europäischer Literatur.
- Grimm, Jacob (1860). Deutsches Wörterbuch. Vol 2. Leipzig: Hirzel.
- Mensing, Otto, ed. (1973) [1927]. "Bruus". Schleswig-Holsteinisches Wörterbuch. A bis E (in German). Vol. 1. Neumünster: Wachholtz Verlag. pp. 542–543.
- Schnack, E (1911). "Bruus, ein Kartenspiel" in Die Heimat (Monthly magazine of the Society for Natural History and Regional Culture in Schleswig-Holstein, Hamburg, Lübeck and the Principality of Lübeck. 21st Year, No. 11. November 1911. AF Jensen, Kiel.
- Schoon, Dietrich (2020). Bruus. Rules of the 1st International Open Schwesing Bruus Tournament, 4 Mar 2020.
- Schütze, Johann Friedrich (1800). Holsteinisches Idiotikon. Vol 1. Hamburg: Heinrich Ludwig Villaume.
- Walter, W. (1912). "Bruus" in Die Heimat, No. 5, May 1912.
- Zahn, W. (1885). "Niederdeutsche Namen der Spielkarten" in Korrespondenzblatt des Vereins für niederdeutsche Sprachforschung, Vol 10, pp. 69–70.
