= Stýrivolt =

Old Danish card game from the Faroe Islands

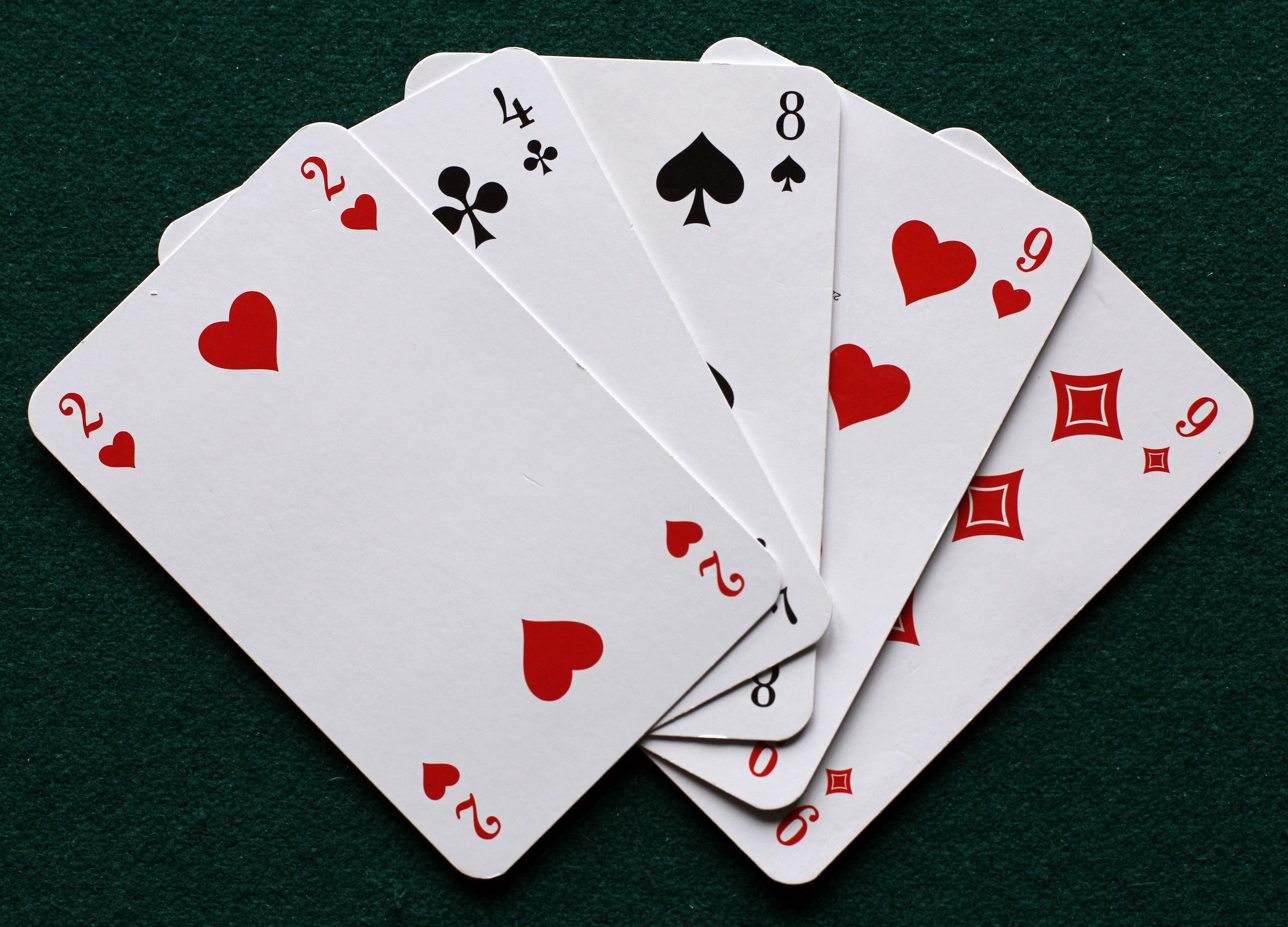
- The matadors
- Origin: Denmark
- Type: Plain-trick game
- Family: Karnöffel group
- Players: 4
- Cards: 48
- Deck: French pack
- Rank (high→low): ♥2 ♣4 ♠8 ♥9 ♦9 Trumps:A J 6 8/9 2 3 4 K Q 5 Side suits: A K Q J 9–2
- Play: Clockwise

Related games
- Knüffeln, Karnöffel, Karniffel
- Two chosen suits

Stýrivolt (Faroese pronunciation: [ˈstʊirɪ.vɔlt]) or Stýrvolt (Danish: styrvolt, from the Low German stürewold = "wild, unruly person") is an old Scandinavian card game, that appears to be extinct today except on the Faroe Islands.

Stýrivolt is closely related to Knüffeln and both are descended from the German game of Karnöffel, the oldest European card game with a continuous tradition of play. Styrivolt probably evolved from Karnöffel during the early 17th century and must have quickly spread to Scandinavia for, in 1658 in Sweden, a game with the name stýr-wålt is mentioned in the poem, Hercules (Herkules), by Georg Stiernhielm along with other card games including Karniffel.

On the Faroes, the game has been played since the 18th century, being mentioned, for example, in Jens Christian Svabo's Indberetninger fra en Reise i Færöe, 1781 - 1782. As Styrvolt, the game is described in several Danish games compendia, the earliest being Politiske Spille Regler for de tilladelige og meest brugelige Spil i Vertshusene (1774), an example of which is in the Royal Danish Library in Copenhagen. From these sources it is clear that Stýrivolt has changed little over the last two centuries. Another early Danish reference is found in a 1798 book on the culture of North Zealand in which Styrvolt is mentioned three times, including as a game at which farmers play for money.

Stýrivolt is a game for four players in two teams of two. There are five permanent trumps and two chosen suits with cards that have different privileges as follows:

- Aces and Jacks - full trumps
- Sixes, Twos, Threes and Fours - partial trumps i.e. they can only beat certain cards in the unchosen suits,
- Sevens - unbeatable when led, otherwise worthless
- Eights and Nines - free cards, only beatable by trumps when led, otherwise worthless
- Kings and Queens - some privileges when led
- Fives - only useful for exchanging with a trump turnup

Several Faroese terms in Stýrivolt are derived directly from the German language. For example, the karniffil (from German Karnöffel) is the Jack and the pavstur (from the German Papst i.e. "Pope") is the Six.

Stýrivolt has become a rare pastime now on the Faroes. In 1975, an article in the cultural magazine, Varðin, said that it was threatened by extinction and had practically disappeared from Denmark. (Note: Historically Styrvolt meant a blank (i.e. worthless) playing card in Danish.) In the same article it was described as "a little complicated to understand", but also as "extremely entertaining" once one had first learnt the special terminology. This article was published in English in 1998 (see Literature) and described the rules as the game was played in Kvívík.

== Literature ==
- Bærentsen, Jógvan (1975). "Stýrivoltur" in Varðin, Vol. 43, Issue 3/4, (1975) pp. 162–168
- Junge, Joachim (1798). Den nordsiellandske Landalmues: Character, Skikke, Meeninger og Sprog ("The North Zealand Common Land: Character, Customs, Meaning and Language.") Popp, Copenhagen.
- McLeod, John (1998). "Stýrivolt" at www.pagat.com - English translation and revision.
- Parlett, David (2008). The Penguin Book of Card Games, Penguin, London. ISBN 978-0-141-03787-5
- Stiernhielm, Georg (1993). Trumpf på hand: en historia om svenska spelkort, Uddevalla.
