= Bells (suit) =

German playing card suit

- Symbol from Bavarian pattern
- Native name: German: Schellen
- Decks: German-suited playing cards; Swiss-suited playing cards
- Invented: 15th century

Bells (German: Schellen) is one of the four playing card suits in a deck of Swiss-suited and German-suited playing cards. Unlike the other German suits, this suit was not adapted by French card makers. In its place, there was initially a suit of red crescents until the suit of Diamonds was added to the French pack (known as tiles in France). The suit is usually known in German as Schellen, but is sometimes abbreviated to Schell. Cards are referred to as in a French deck e.g. the "9 of Bells", but in German as Schellen 9, or the "Unter of Bells" (Schellunter or Schell-Unter).

Bells are the lowest suit in Skat, Schafkopf and Doppelkopf, but the second highest in Préférence.

The suit of bells specifically depict hawk-bells which are used in falconry. As such, they are reminiscent of the falcon suit used in earlier German hunting decks such as the Ambraser Hofjagdspiel and Stuttgart pack.

The standard German-suited system of leaves, acorns, hearts, and bells appears in the majority of cards from 1460 onwards. There is no evidence for this system prior to this point.

Bells appear as one of four suits alongside feathers, hats, and shields in several incomplete packs made in Basel. The dates for these packs range from 1470 to about 1529. The 10-rank card utilizes pips rather than the characteristic banner.

Bells appear as one of four suits alongside crowns, shields, and acorns in a set of mutilated cards possibly made in Alsace in 1480.

The standard four Swiss-German suits of shields, acorns, hawkbells and flowers were found in playing cards inside a book cover (circa 1530) made in Basel. These cards feature the distinguishing banner replacing the 10-rank, and have the three court cards: King seated in a throne, Ober, and Unter. This Swiss-German suit system is believed to have developed earlier with the earliest example dated between 1433 and 1451, though only cards from the shields suit survived.

== Weli ==
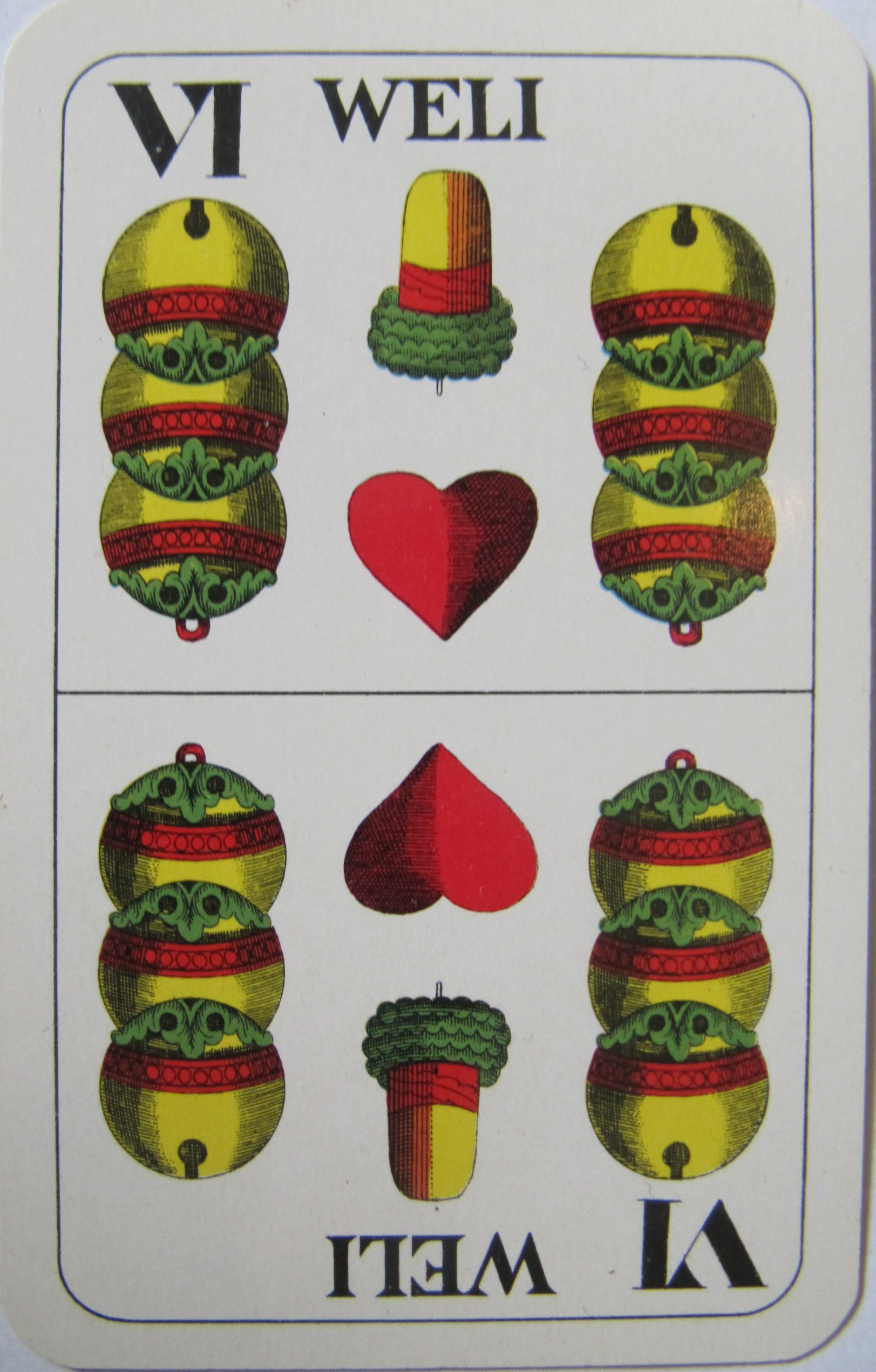
6 (Weli)

In a 32-card pack the lowest card is a 7; in 36-card packs it is a 6. In Austria, the 6 of Bells often has special powers, typically being wild, and is known as the Weli, Welli or Belle. In William Tell and Salzburg pattern cards, the Weli bears the additional suit symbols for Hearts and Acorns in recognition of this role. It may also be promoted to become a high trump card, for example, it is the second highest trump card in the popular Austrian game of Watten.

== Gallery ==
=== German pattern ===
The gallery below shows the suit of Bells from a German suited pack, Saxon pattern pack of 32 cards. This pattern was traditionally used in Saxony and is still made by ASS Altenburger.

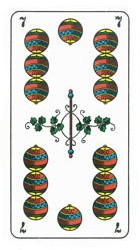
7

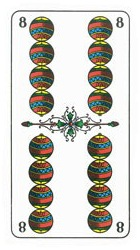
8

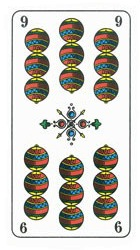
9

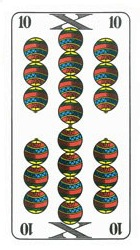
10

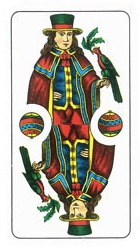
Unter

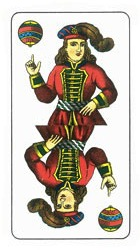
Ober

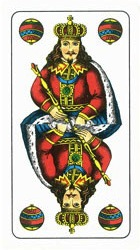
King

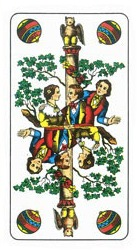
Deuce

=== Swiss-German pattern ===
The following images depict the suit of Bells from an 1850 Swiss-suited pack:

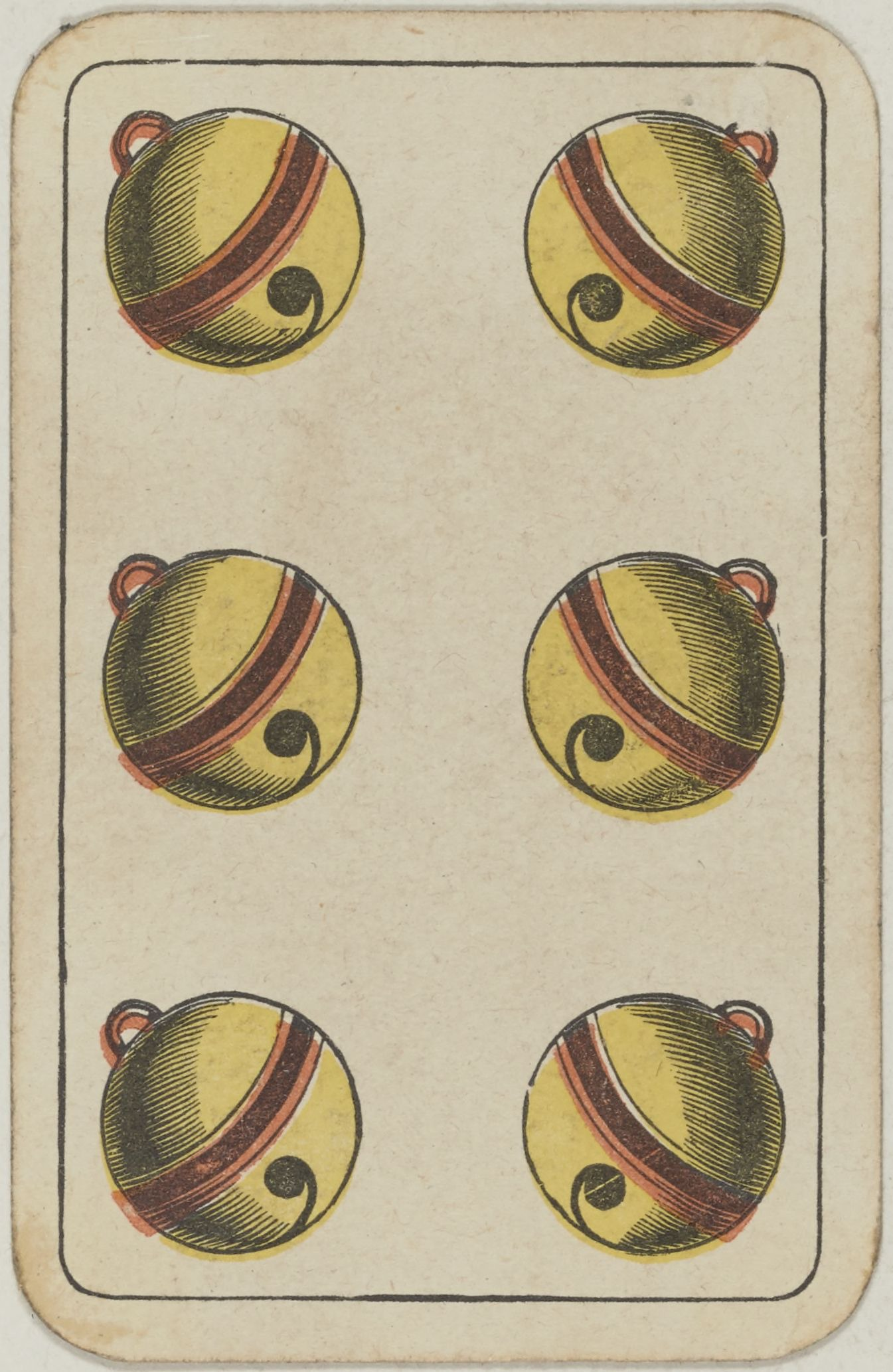
6

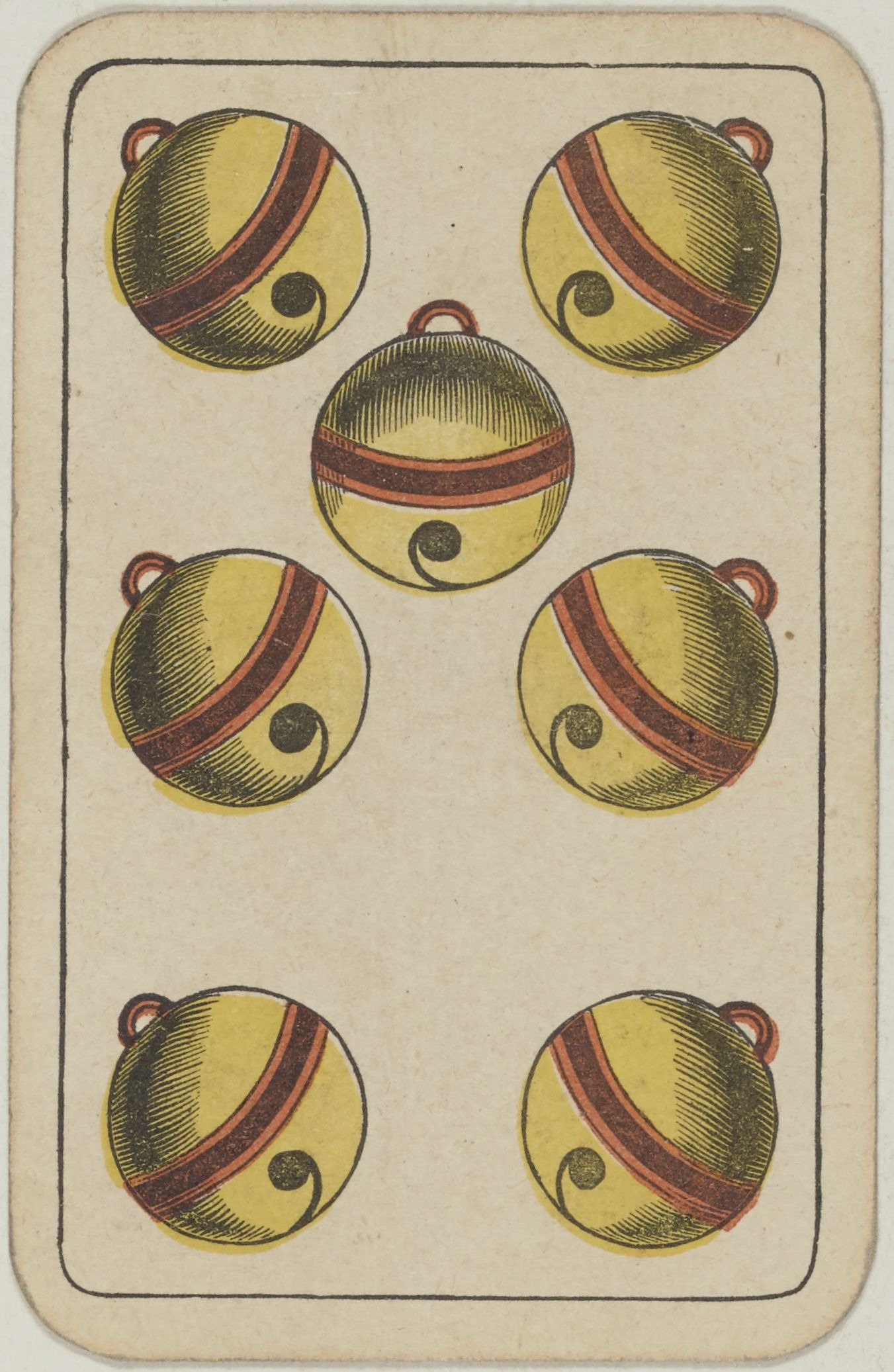
7

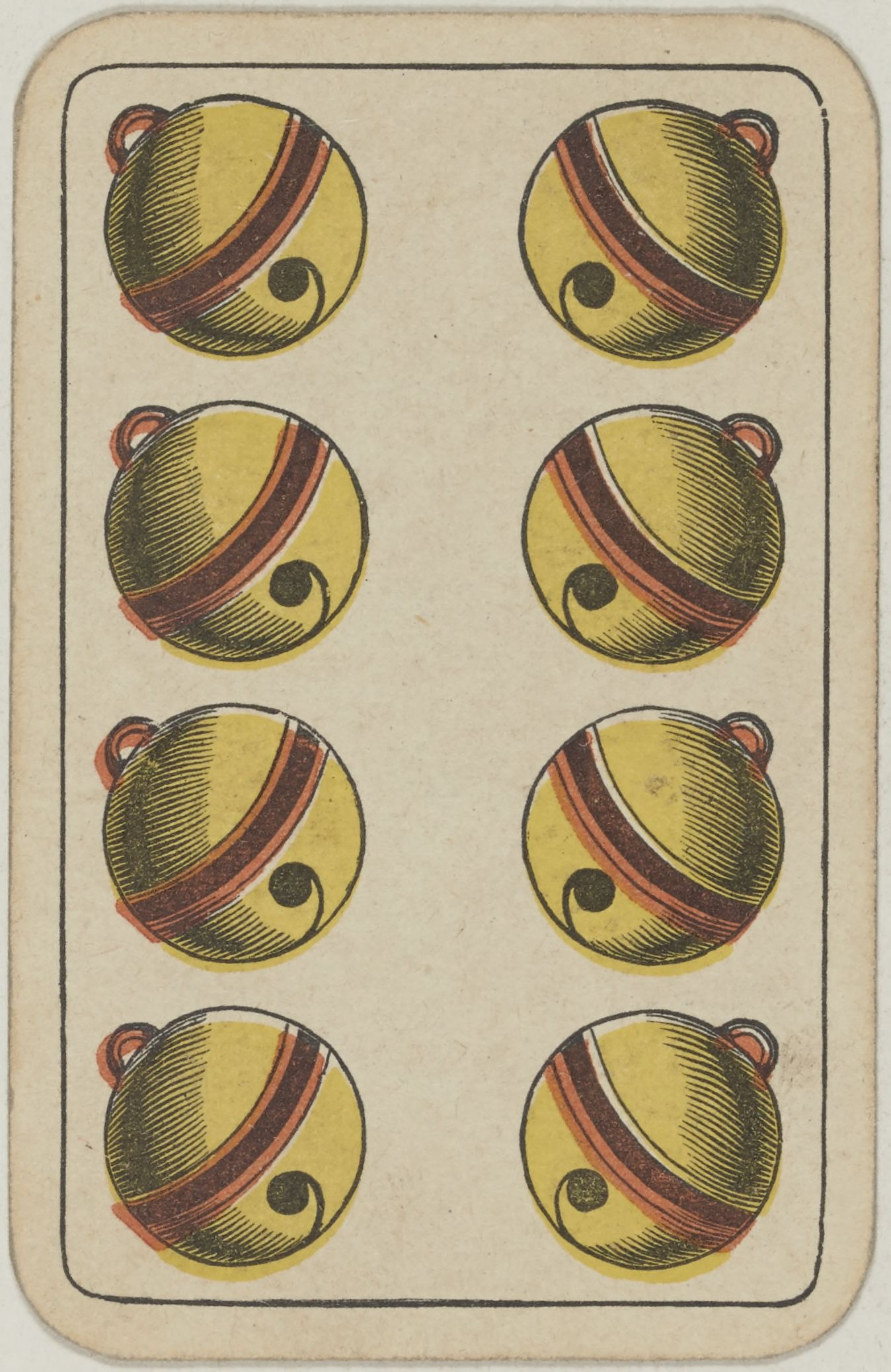
8

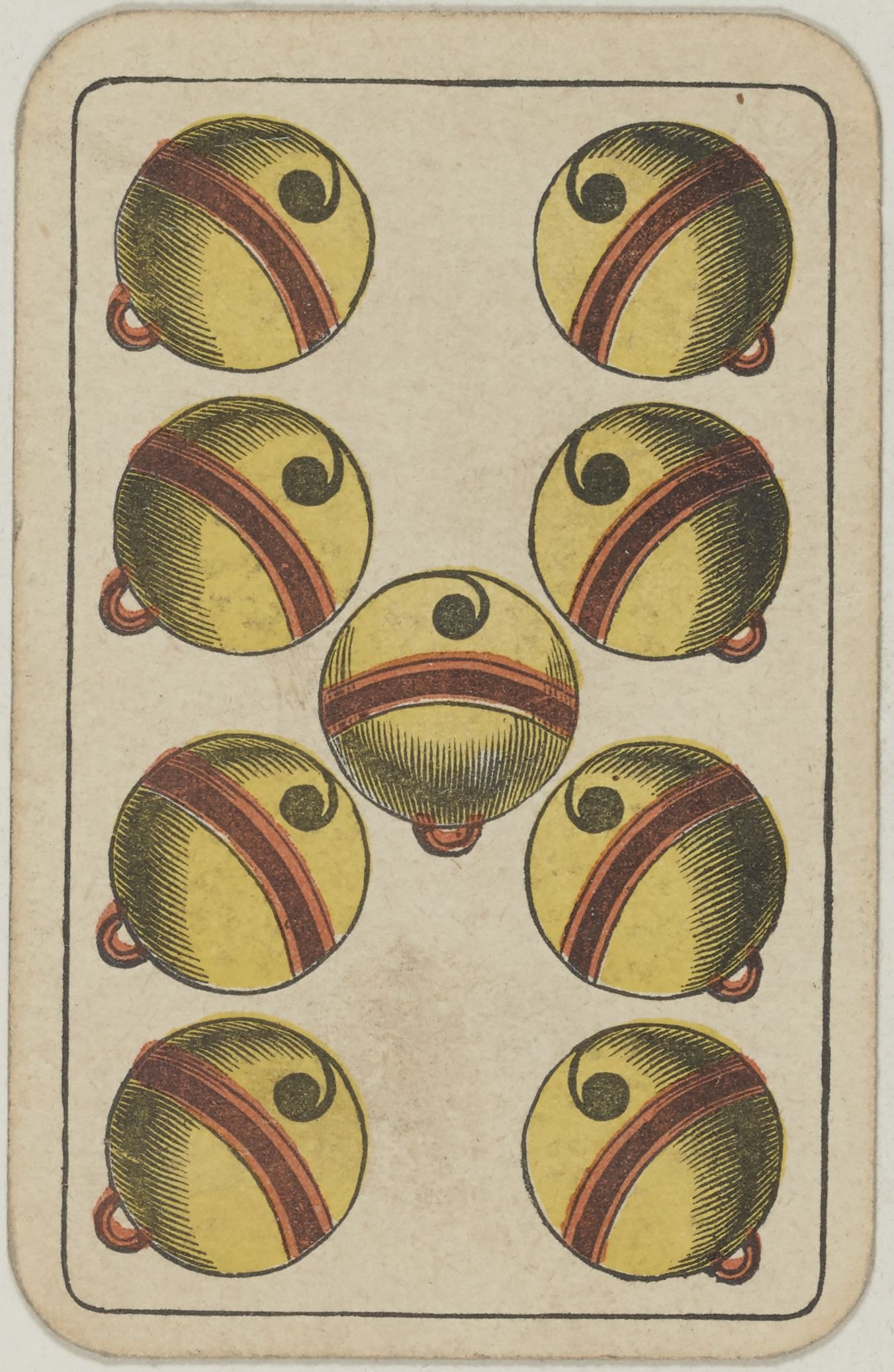
9

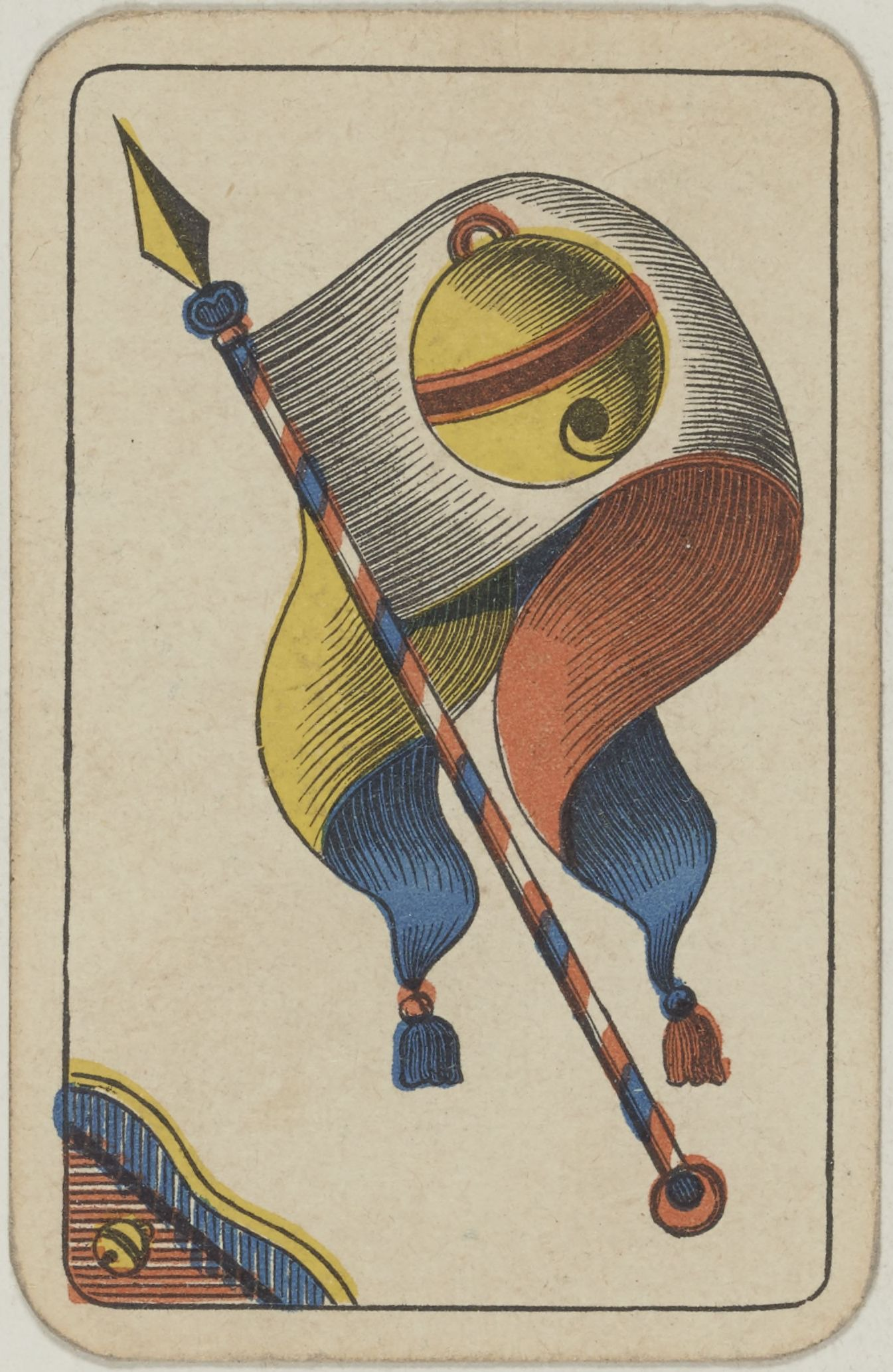
Banner

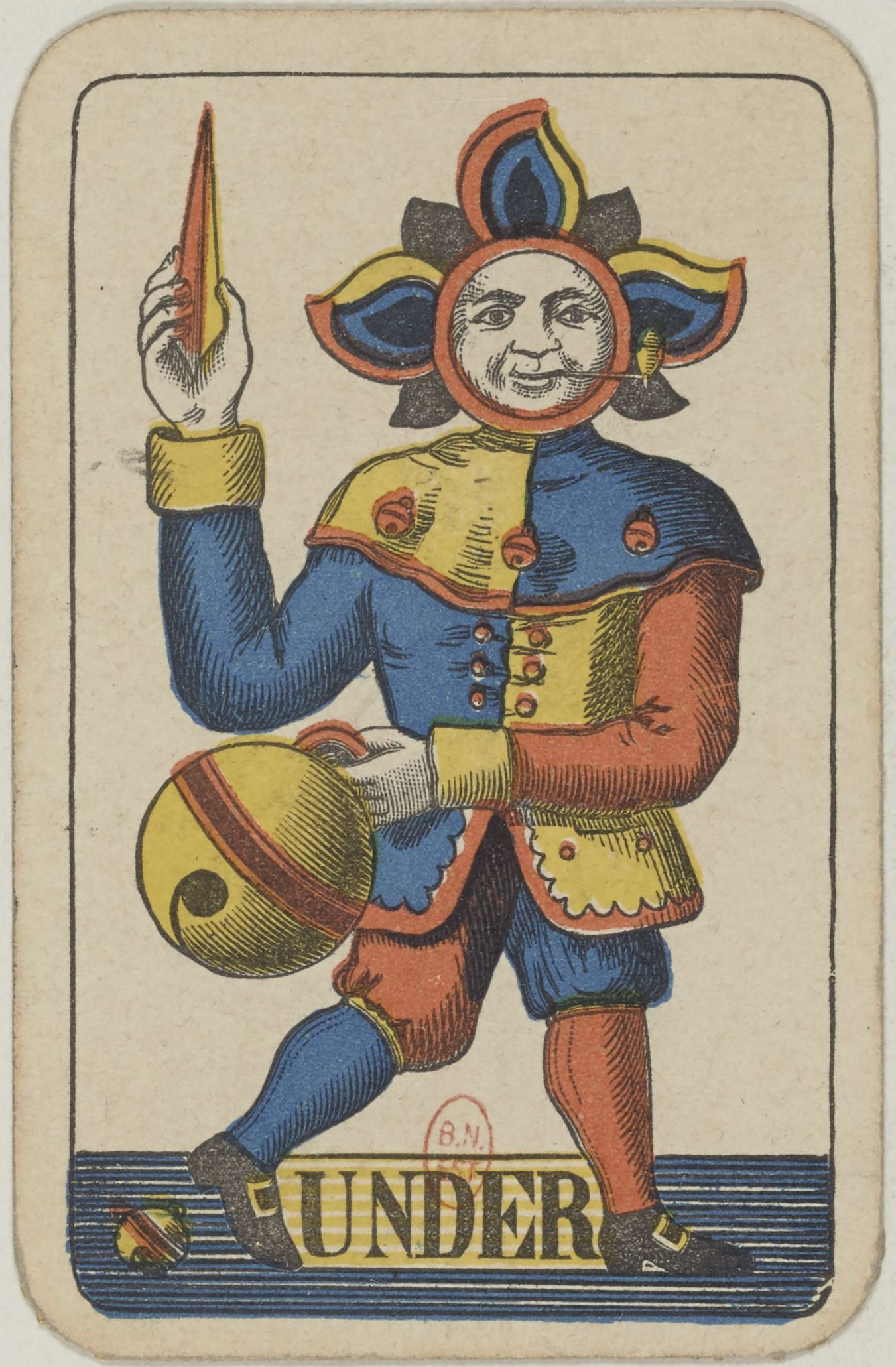
Unter

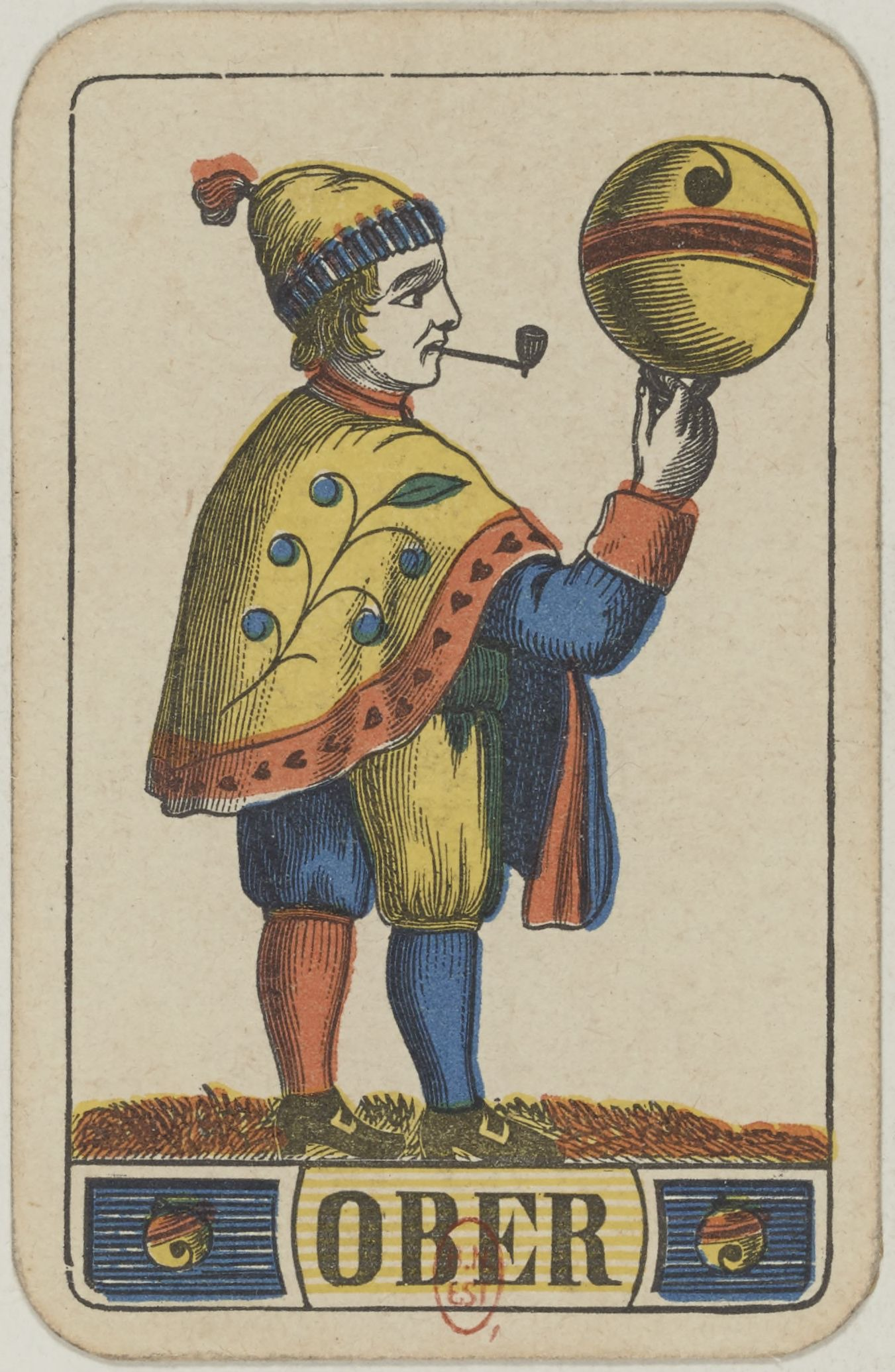
Ober

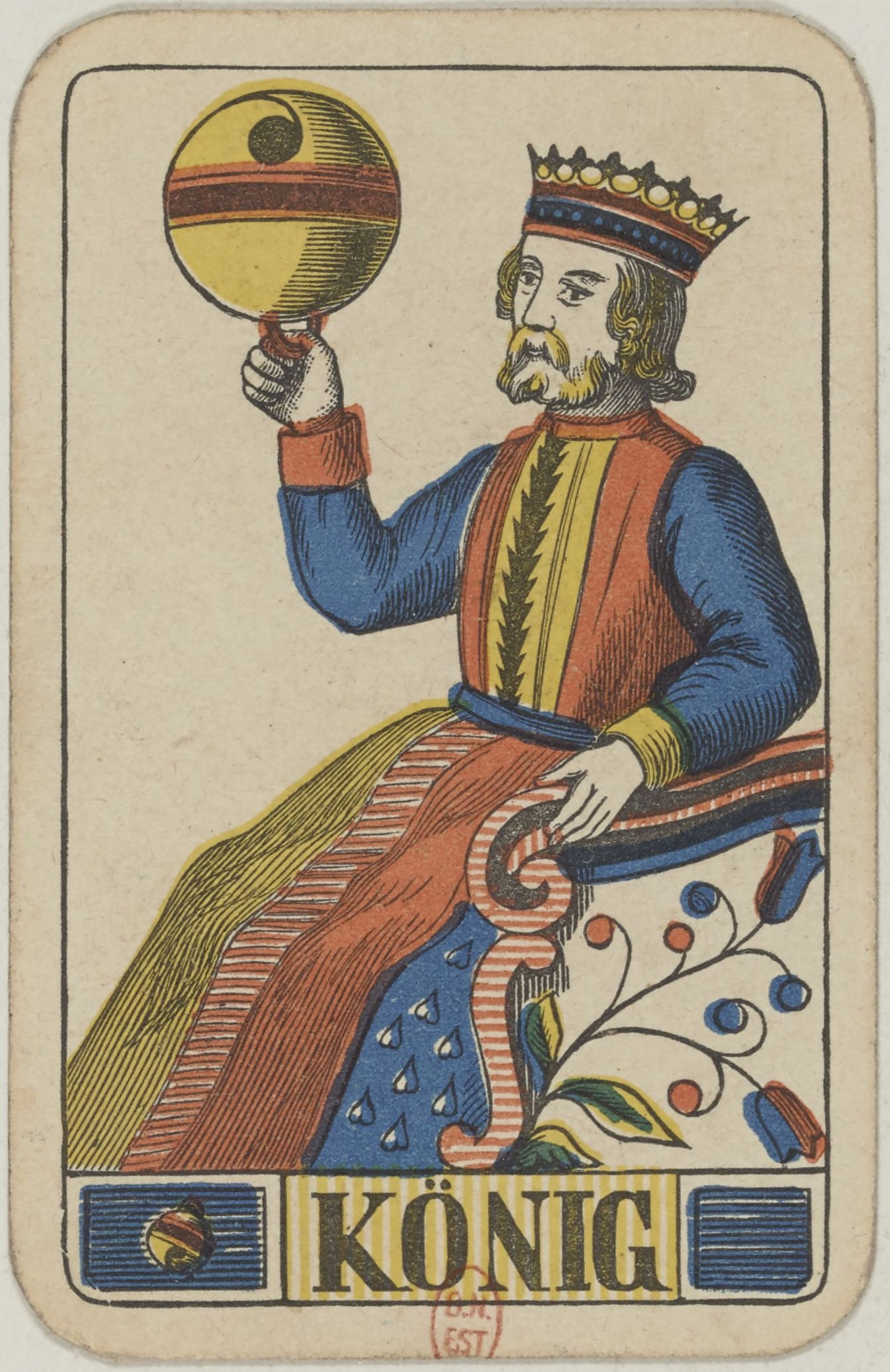
King

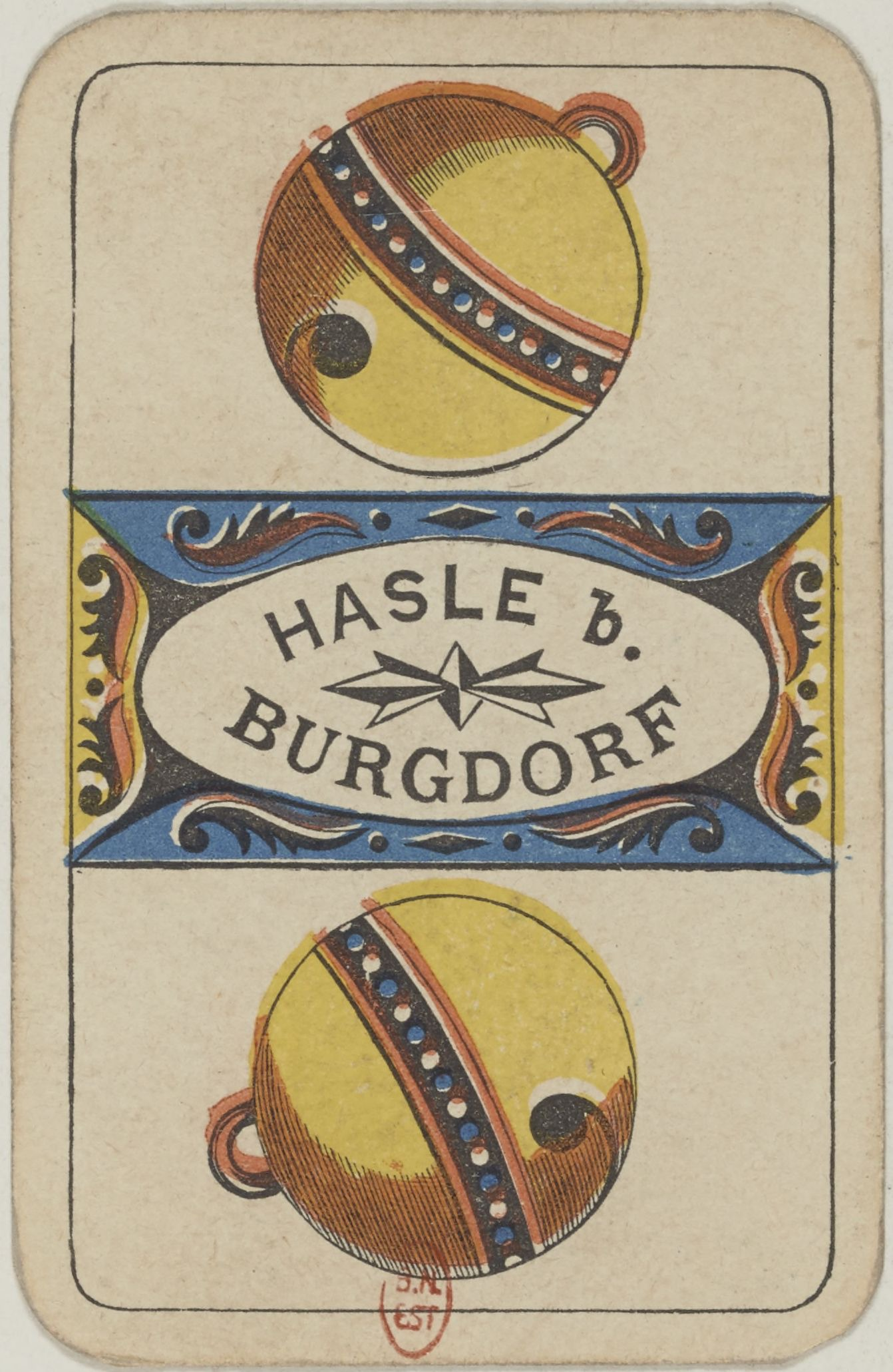
Deuce
