= Roses (suit) =

Suit in Swiss playing cards

- Native name: German: Rosen
- Deck: Swiss-suited playing cards
- Invented: 15th century

Roses or Flowers is one of the four playing card suits in a deck of Swiss-suited playing cards. This suit was invented in 15th century German speaking Switzerland and is a survivor from a large pool of experimental suit signs created to replace the Latin suits. It is equivalent to the Hearts suit in German and French decks. It is equivalent to the German Leaves (suit), as both the roses and leaves suits have a central stem on their pip patterns so that they can make a pair with the Swiss-German Acorns (suit). It may have derived from the floral patterns on the North-Italian Coins (suit).

== Characteristics ==
The rose is represented by a stylised yellow flower, with six leaves and an orange pistil.

In German, the suit is called Rosen.

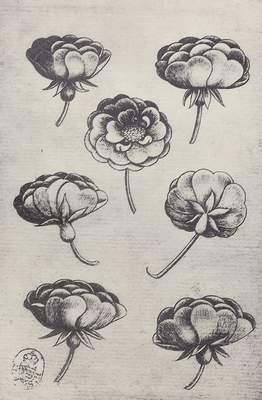
7 of Flowers by the Master of the Playing Cards

Flowers appear as one of five suits alongside birds, deer, beasts of prey, and wild men in a deck (circa 1455) created by the Master of the Playing Cards, making it one of the first suits created via copperplate engravings. The single flower suit features both Cyclamens and Roses. The ranks appear to go from 1 to 9 with three or four court cards: King, Queen, Ober and/or Unter. As flowers were a common motif for manuscripts at the time (see fleuron), it was easy to reuse existing plates to design new compositions for the different medium.

Flowers appear as three out of five suits alongside hares and parrots in a deck of circular cards (circa 1500). The name of the artist is unknown, but is said to be "Master P.W." after their monogram. The three flower suits are Carnations, Columbines, and Roses. The ranks go from 1 through 10 with four court cards: King, Queen, Ober, and Unter. Additionally, there are two special cards: one honoring Cologne and the other is a Death card. The total number of cards is 72.

Roses appear as one of four suits alongside pomegranates (Note: The pomegranates suit appeared earlier in a 1496 modified Spanish-suited pack made by a south German engraver where the pomegranates replaced the coins suit. It possibly alludes to the kingdom of Granada.) and the familiar leaves and acorns in a pack of cards (circa 1523) created by Hans Sebald Beham. The ranks go from 2 through 10 with three court cards: King seated on a horse, Ober, and Unter. Roman numerals are indexed at the top of the cards while Arabic numerals are indexed at the bottom. Notably, all the pip cards have a central stem and there is a sow on the three of acorns; which later would migrate to the deuce when the 3-rank was dropped in later packs.

The standard four Swiss-German suits of shields, acorns, hawkbells and flowers were found in playing cards inside a book cover (circa 1530) made in Basel. These cards feature the distinguishing banner replacing the 10-rank, and have the three court cards: King seated in a throne, Ober, and Unter. This Swiss-German suit system is believed to have developed earlier with the earliest example dated between 1433 and 1451, though only cards from the shields suit survived.

== Cards ==
The following images depict the suit of Roses from an 1850 Swiss-suited pack:

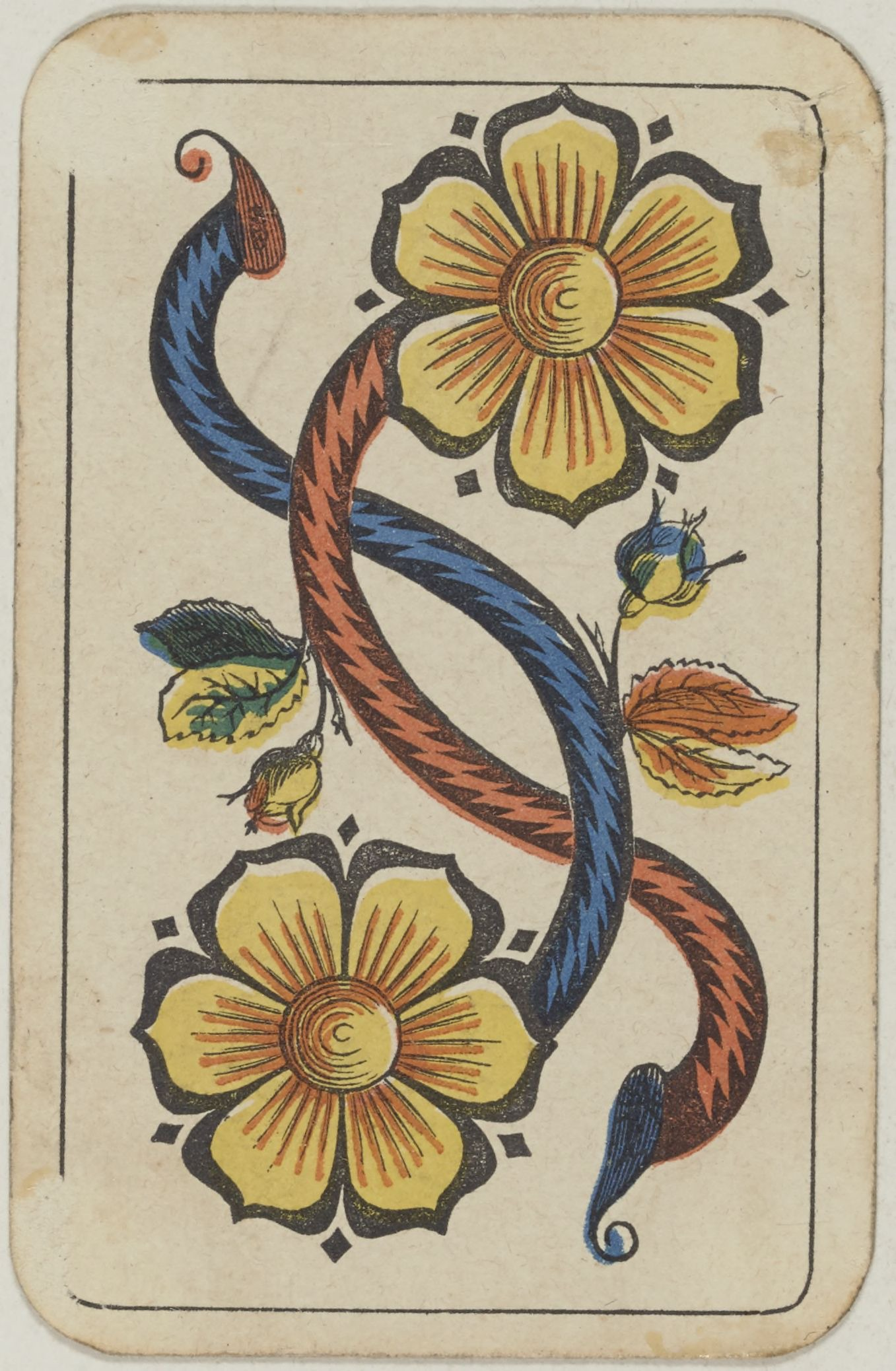
Deuce

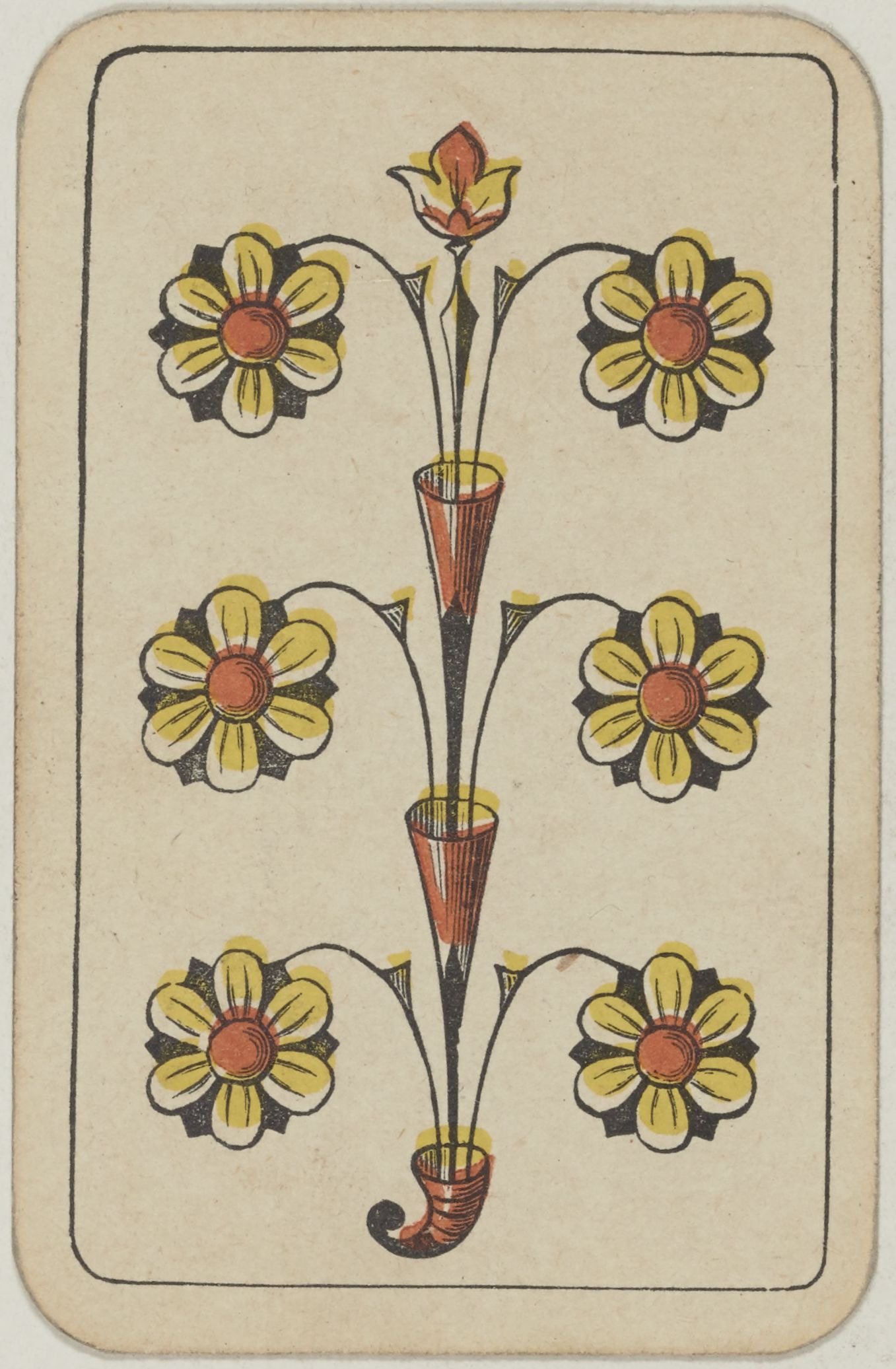
6

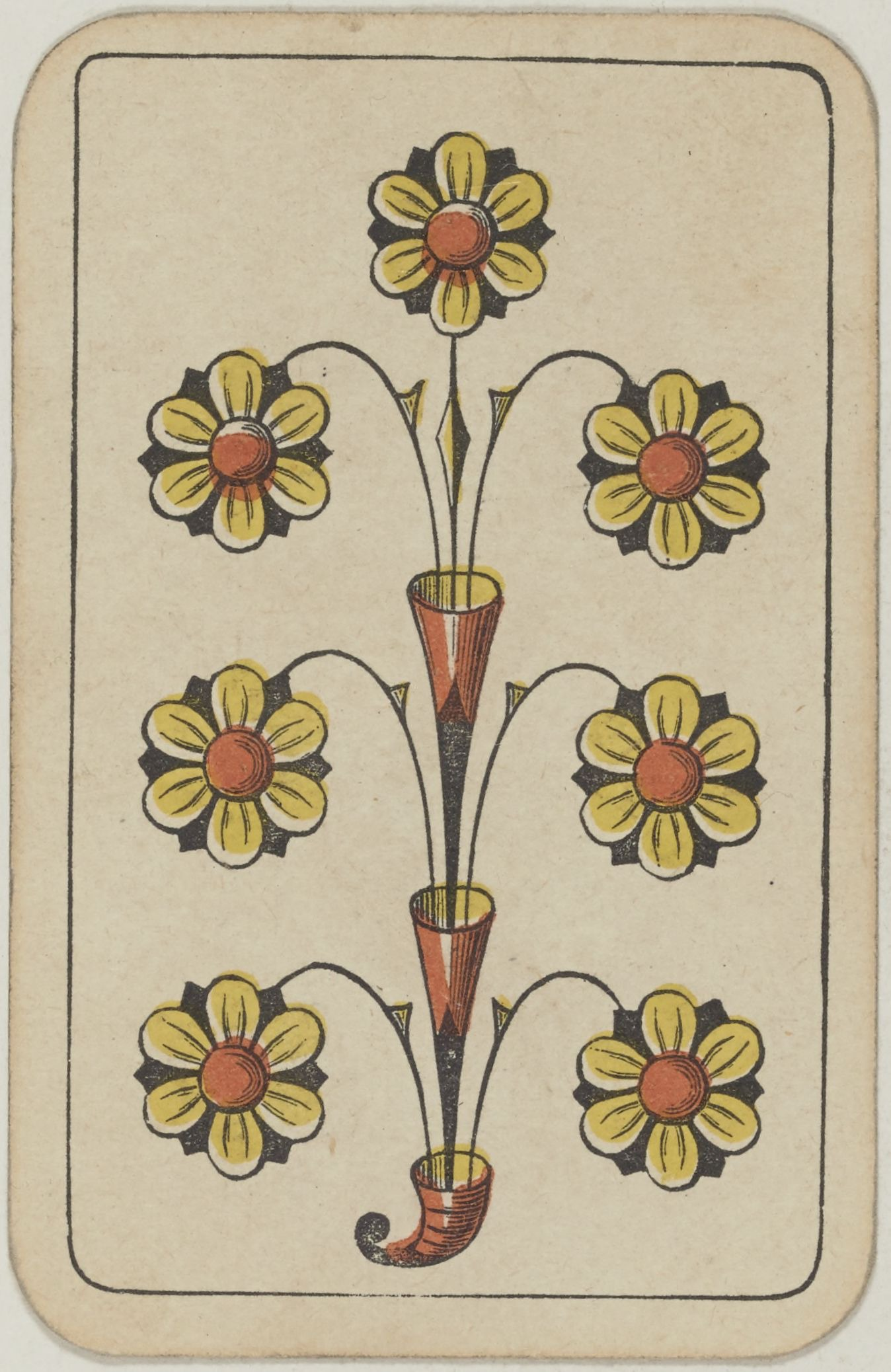
7

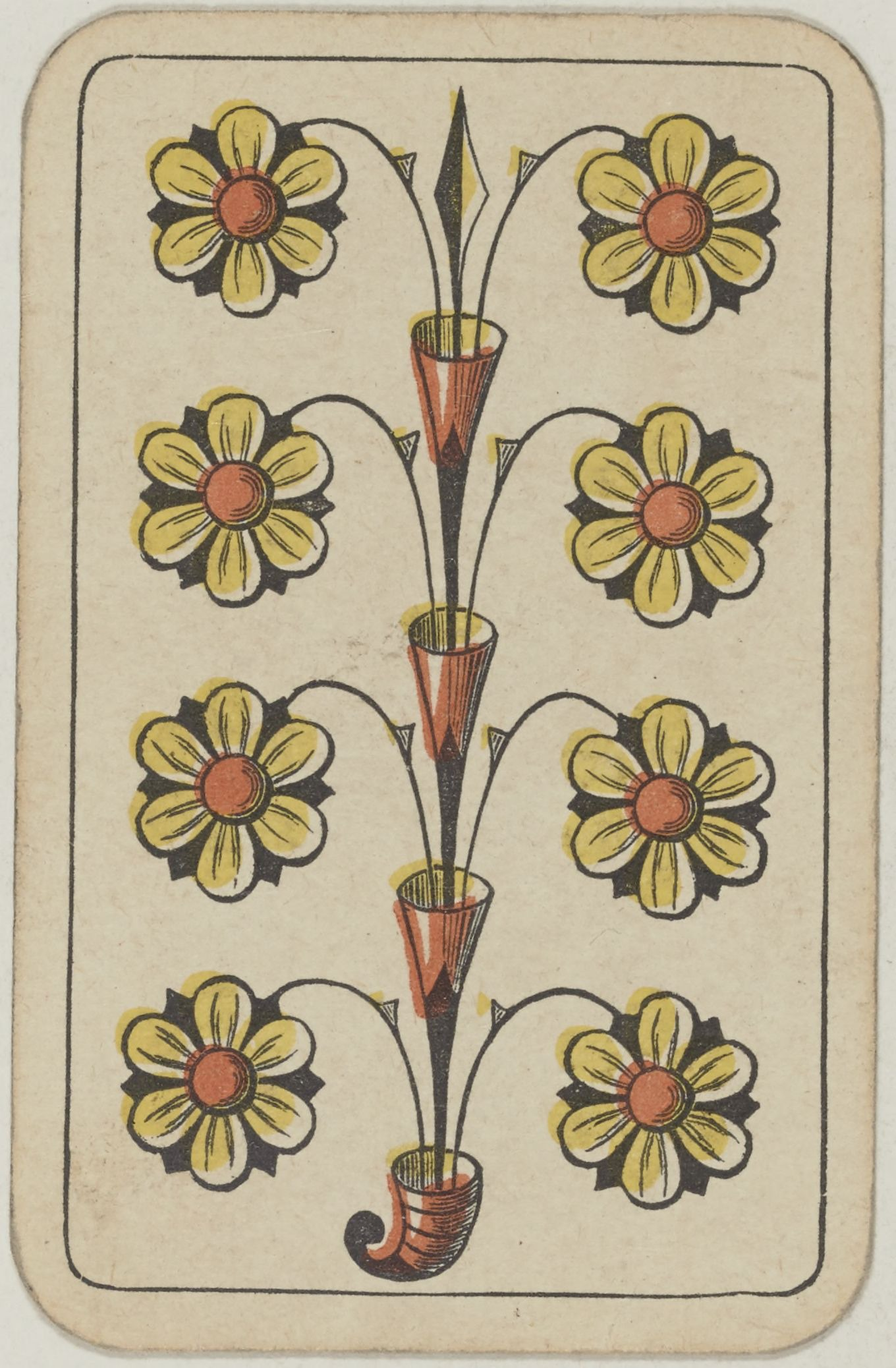
8

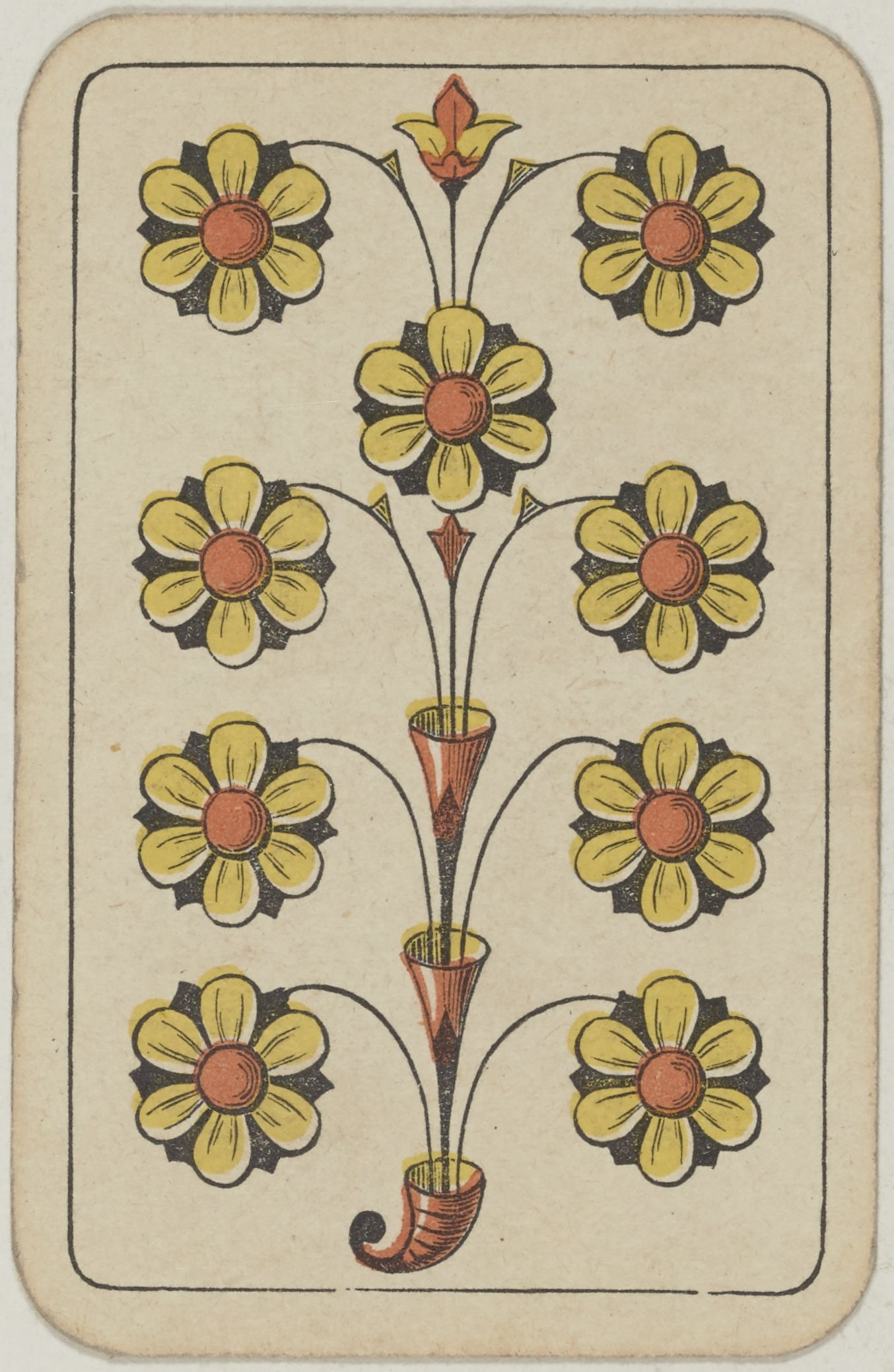
9

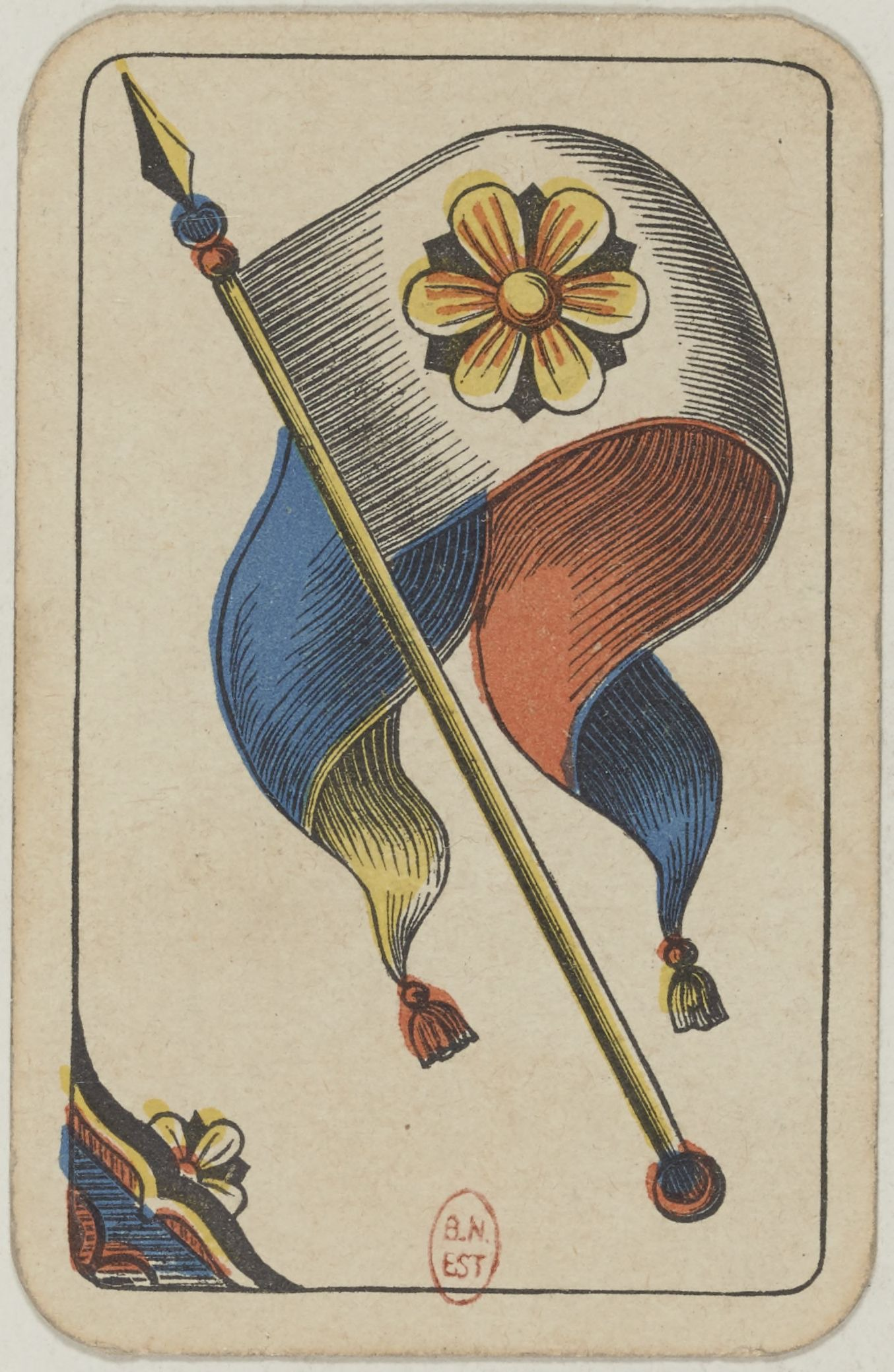
Banner

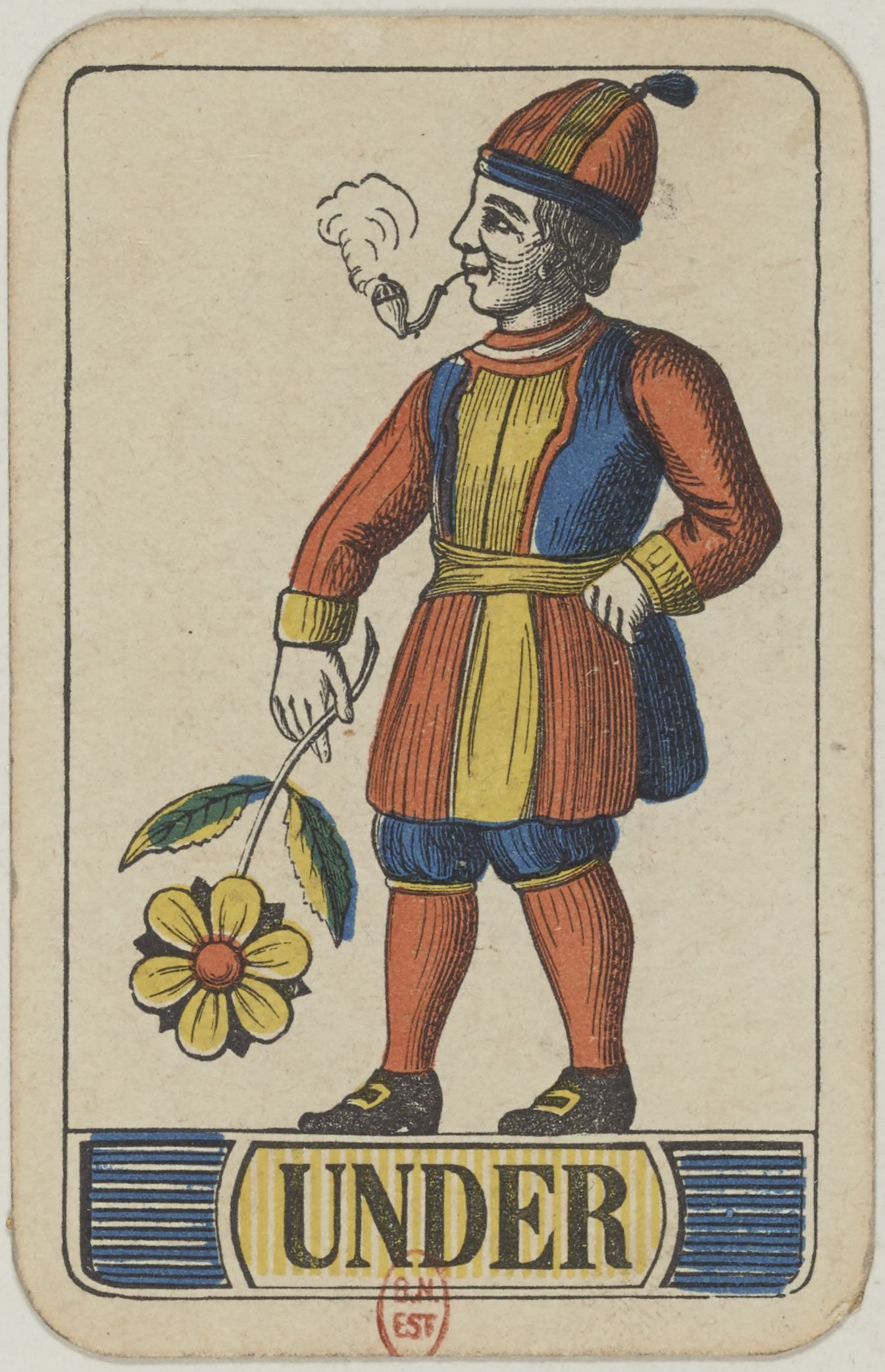
Unter

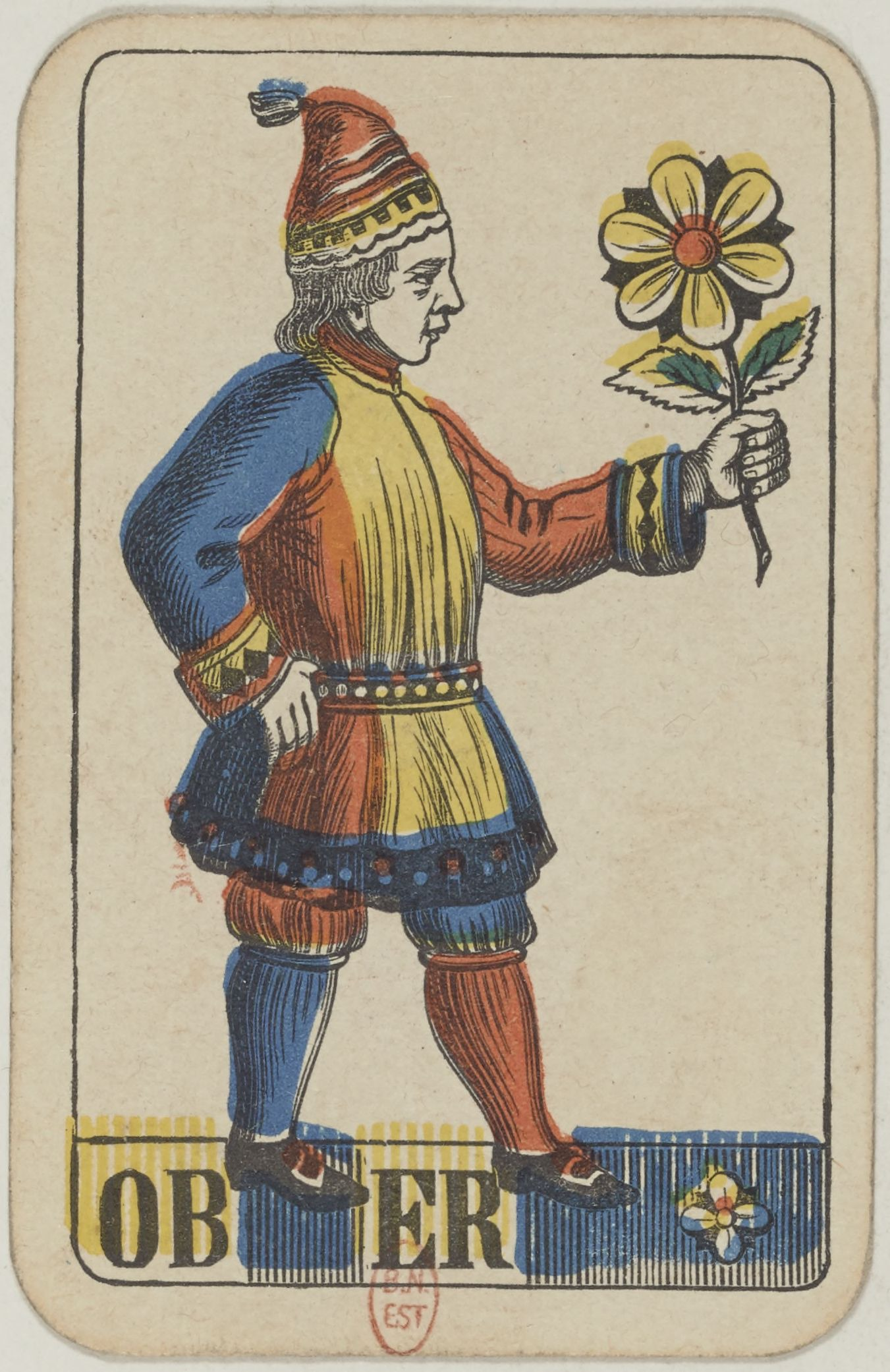
Ober

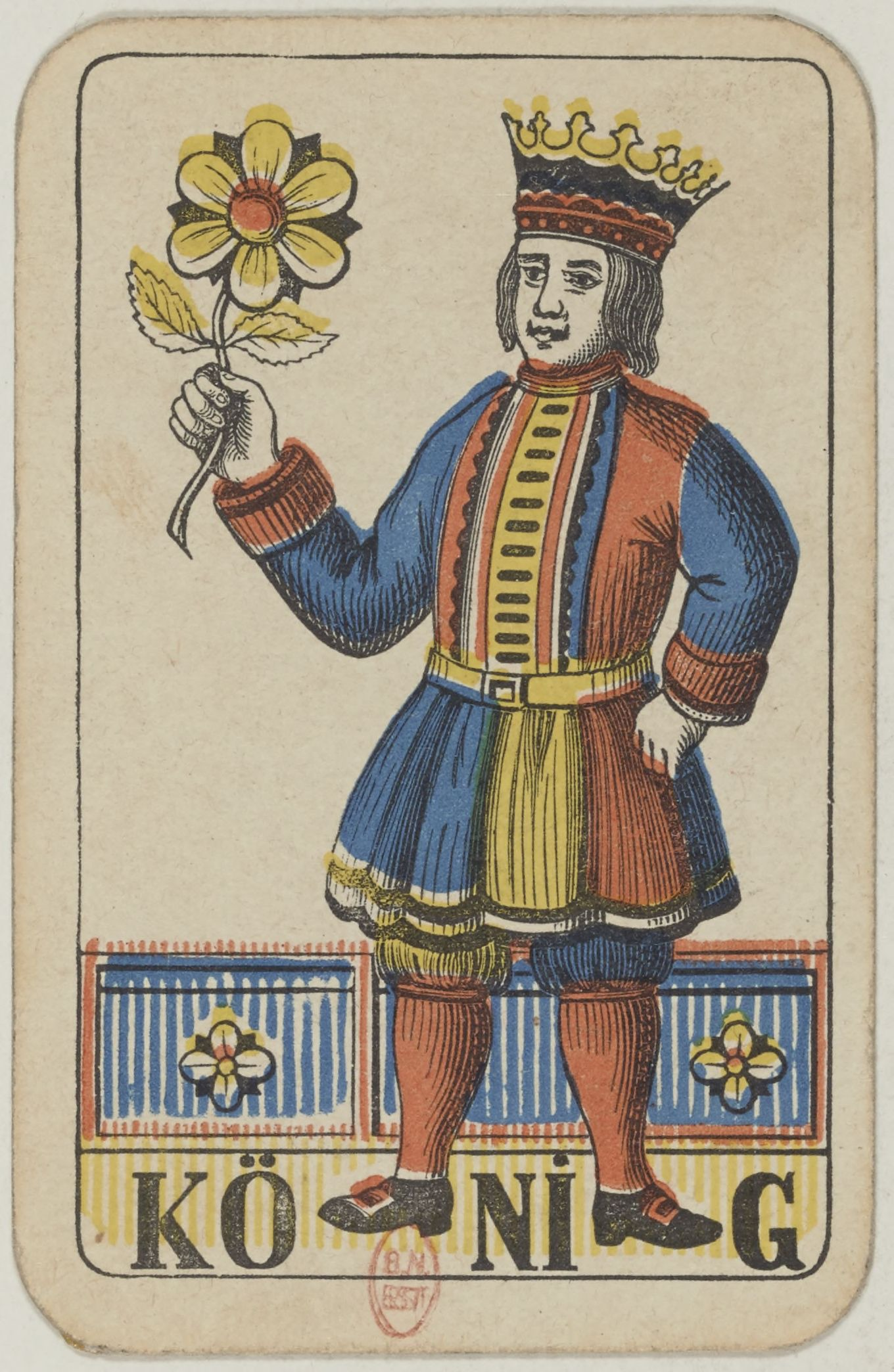
King

== Coding ==
The roses or flowers suit is not explicitly defined in Unicode. It is recommended to use stylistic fonts for regional variations of the French suits. However, fleurons can also be used in its place. For example:

Character information
Preview	✿		❀	
Unicode name	BLACK FLORETTE		WHITE FLORETTE	
Encodings	decimal	hex	dec	hex
Unicode	10047	U+273F	10048	U+2740
UTF-8	226 156 191	E2 9C BF	226 157 128	E2 9D 80
Numeric character reference	&#10047;	&#x273F;	&#10048;	&#x2740;

== See also ==
- Hanafuda (literally flower cards) - Japanese playing cards which are unrelated to the roses suit, but coincidentally have only of flower-based suits
