= Banner (playing card) =

Playing card in Swiss-suited decks

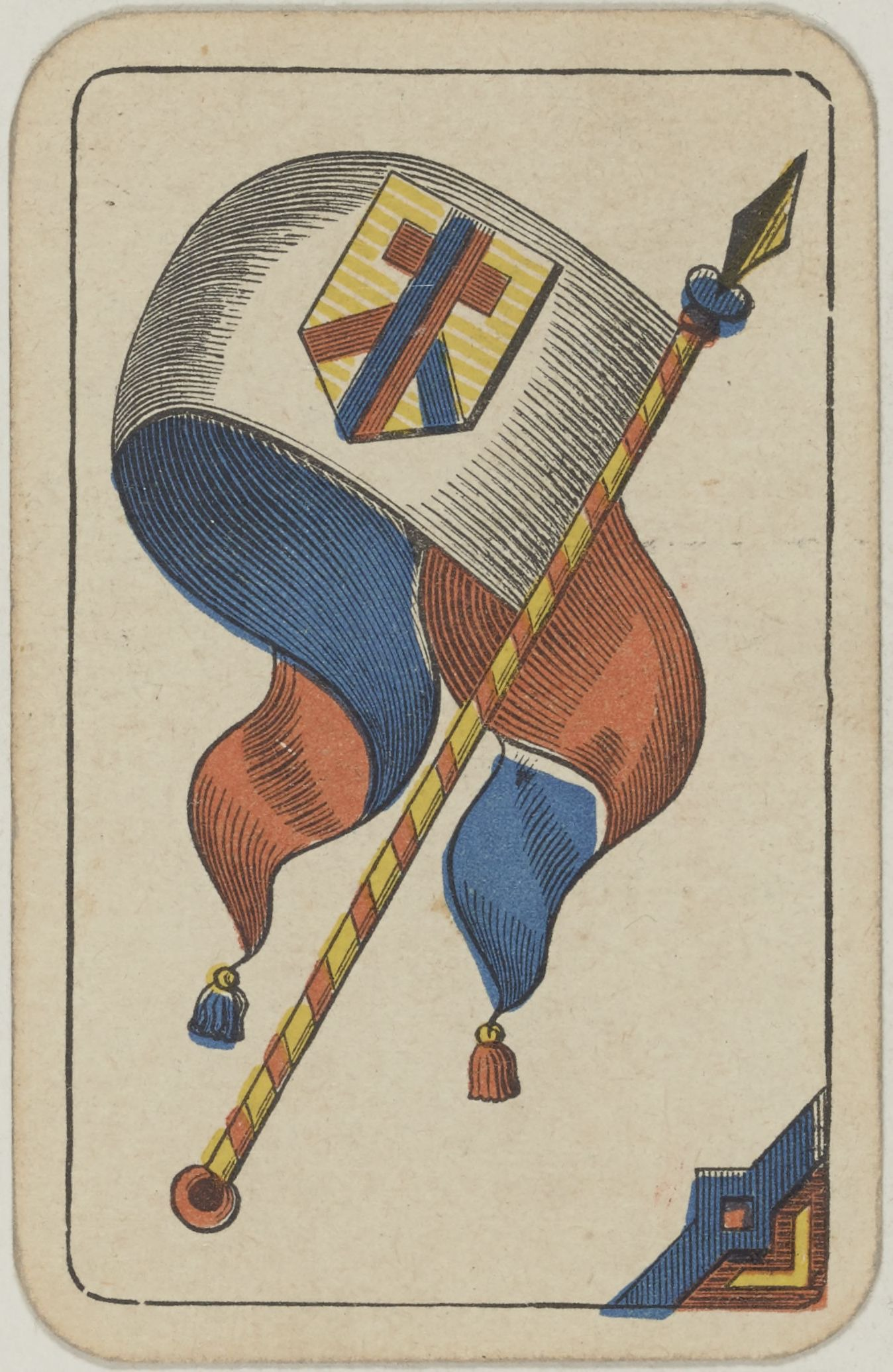
The Banner of Shields from an 1850 Swiss pack

The Banner is a playing card used in Swiss-suited cards and which historically formed part of the standard 36- or 48-card German-suited packs. It is equivalent to a 10, being ranked between a 9 and an Unter (or Under in Swiss German).

== Name ==
In German, Banner means “flag” or “banner” and is pronounced /ˈbanɐ/. It is grammatically neuter and its plural is the same: Banner. Historically it was also spelt Panier.

== Characteristics ==
In German-speaking Switzerland, to the east of the Brünig-Napf-Reuss line (the German-speaking part of Switzerland corresponding to the centre and east of the country), the most popular card deck is a pack of 36 cards with the Swiss suit symbols of Acorns, Bells, Roses and Shields and numbered as follows: 6, 7, 8, 9, 10 or Banner, Unter, Ober, King and Deuce.

While the pip cards 6 to 9 display a number of suit symbols corresponding to the number of the card, the 10 follows a different scheme. It has only one example of the suit symbol, much larger than on the other cards, depicted on a banner floating in the wind, which gives the card its name. Like the court cards, the Banners are double-ended in modern packs, and the image begins repeated symmetrically about a diagonal line through the card, represented by the flagpole. Older patterns are sometimes single-ended.

== History ==
The Swiss Banner may be derived from old card games from the German-speaking regions of Europe which were based on a hunting theme, where cards worth ten points were also represented by a banner such as the Ambraser Hofjagdspiel (c. 1440–1445) and Stuttgarter Kartenspiel (c. 1430).

In the mid-19th century, the obscure Mysore Chad Ganjifa seems to have independently developed the Dhwaja (flag or banner) card, which ranks higher than the twelve pip cards, but lower than the other five court cards.

== Gallery ==
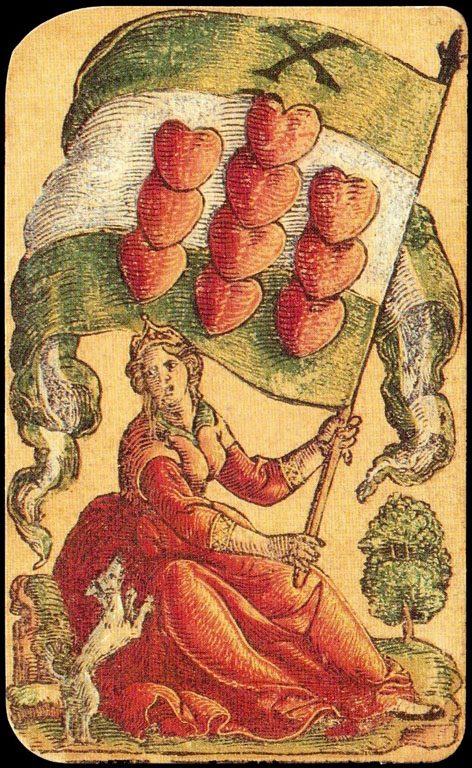
Banner of Hearts from a 48-card, German-suited, German pattern pack dating to c. 1545

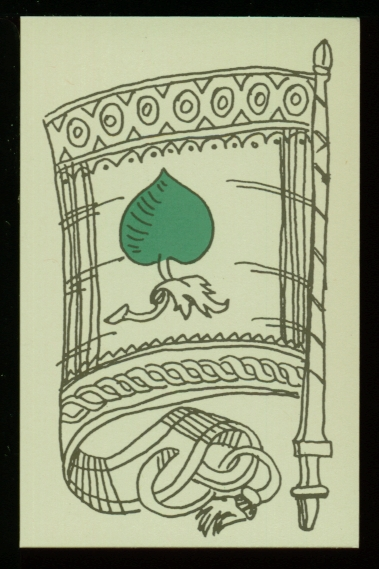
Banner of Leaves from a 48-card, German-suited, Polish pattern pack dating to 1537

== See also ==
- Playing card
- Jass
- Deuce
- Ober
- Unter
