= Stuttgart pack =

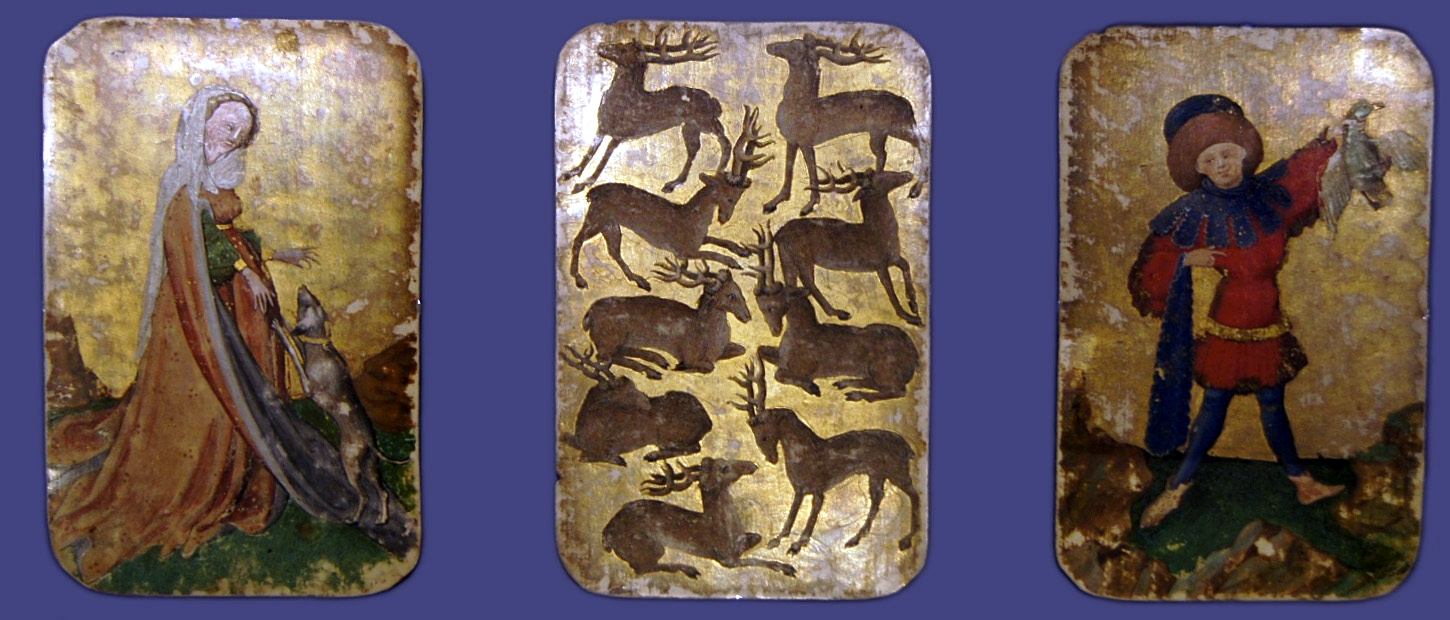
Three cards from the deck

The Stuttgart pack or Stuttgart Cards (German: Stuttgarter Kartenspiel) is one of the most valuable collections of the Landesmuseum Württemberg. It is a hunting-themed deck of playing cards painted on gilded pasteboard dating to around 1430. They are thus among the earliest surviving packs of playing cards.

== Description ==
49 of the original 52 cards survive. The cards are divided into four suits of thirteen ranks. The suits of stags and hounds are led by female face cards (Queen, female Ober, female Unter) while the suits of ducks and falcons are led by men (King, male Ober, male Unter). The 10 of each suit is represented with a banner like in Swiss playing cards. The backs are uniformly painted with red lead.

== Facsimiles ==
A limited edition facsimile of the cards was produced as a boxed set with accompanying booklet in German and English by an unknown manufacturer with the claim that the original cards are the oldest surviving pack in Europe. (Note: See, for example, at glueckshaendler.de.)

== See also ==
- Ambraser Hofjagdspiel, another 15th-century hunting deck
- Flemish Hunting Deck, another 15th-century hunting deck
- Hofämterspiel, a deck found together with the Hofjagdspiel in Ambras Castle
