= Leaves (suit) =

German playing card suit

- Symbol from Bavarian pattern
- Native names: German: Laub, Blatt, Schippen, Gras or Grün
- Deck: German-suited playing cards
- Invented: 15th century

Leaves (German: Laub) is one of the four playing card suits in a deck of German-suited playing cards. This suit was invented in 15th century Germany and is a survivor from a large pool of experimental suit signs created to replace the Latin suits. Around 1480, French card makers adapted this sign into Spades in the French pack (known as pikes in France).

As its name suggests, the leaf is represented by a stylized green leaf. The left half is lighter than the right half; it can sometimes be yellow. Veins are visible and there is usually a petiole. There may also be smaller leaves.

The standard German-suited system of leaves, acorns, hearts, and bells appears in the majority of cards from 1460 onwards. There is no evidence for this system prior to this point.

== Names ==
They are usually known in German as Laub ("foliage"), but also as Gras ("grass"), Blatt ("leaf") or 'Grün ("green"). Cards are referred to as in a French pack e.g. the "King of Leaves", but in German as Laub-König or Grün-König i.e. "Leaf King". It is the second-highest suit in the games of Skat, Schafkopf and Doppelkopf, and the second lowest in Préférence.

== Gallery ==
Today the suit of leaves is still produced as part of the following patterns: Bavarian (Types M and S), Bohemian, East German, Franconian, Saxonian and William Tell. The gallery below shows a suit of Leaves from a German-suited playing cards of 32 cards. The pack is of the Saxonian pattern:

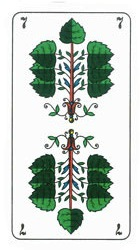
7

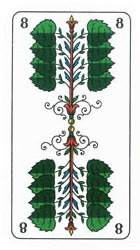
8

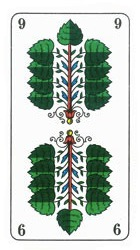
9

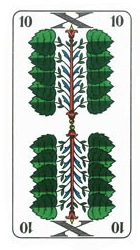
10

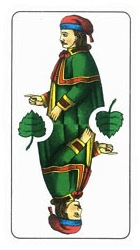
Unter

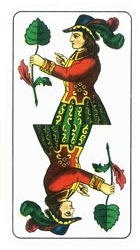
Ober

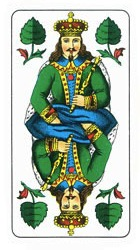
King

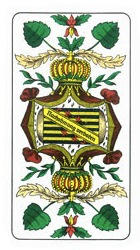
Deuce

== Swiss cards ==
In Swiss-suited playing cards, the equivalent suit is Shields, typically with the following suit symbol:.
