= Hofämterspiel =

Playing card deck

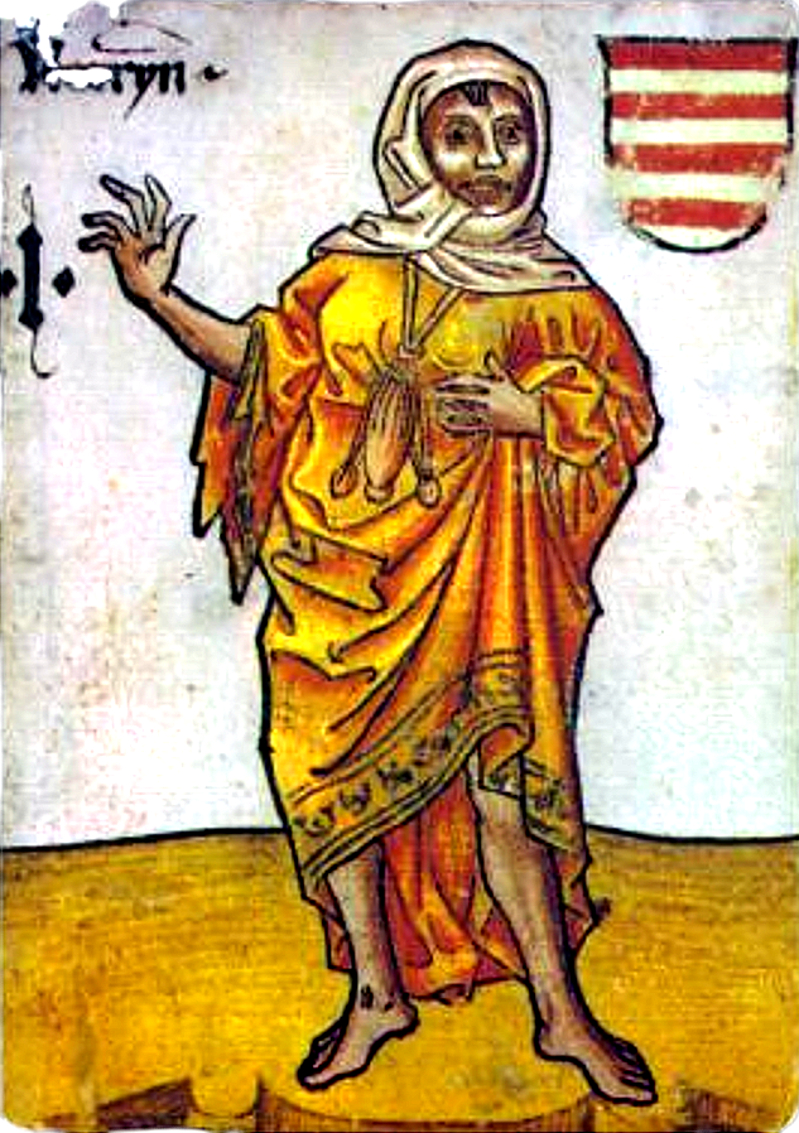
Die Nerryn ("The Fool")

Hofämterspiel ("Courtly Household Cards"), one of the earliest packs of playing cards on record preserved in its entirety with all 48 cards intact, is a major 15th-century medieval handmade deck commissioned by Ladislaus the Posthumous, King of Hungary and Bohemia and Duke of Austria from 1453 to 1457. It was found among the great collection of art treasures of Archduke Ferdinand II of Tyrol in Castle Ambras, Austria, together with another called Ambraser Hofjagdspiel. Their heraldic suits represent, to an extent, "the political and dynastic relationships in Central Europe in middle of the 15th century" and are "of a quality unsurpassed at this early date."

== Illustrations ==
The 48 cards of the deck, measuring c. 97 mm x 140 mm (3¾ in x 5½ in), are decorated with bright-colored tempera paint bear details in silver and gold leaf. The four suits of this set depicting court functions are represented by means of four heraldic colours. Each suit sign carries the coats of arms of four kingdoms: France, Germany, Bohemia and Hungary, so that, accordingly, each card carries the title of the function depicted and the respective Roman number in relation to the suit sign it represents.

The illustrations, with their names written in archaic German, depict the precedence of different court functions during the late Middle Ages, together with the values of the cards, numbered 1 - 10 in Roman numerals, except for the king and queen which have no number and are also the only two subjects that do not state the character's occupation.

In all four suits the I features a fool, Narr, or its female equivalent Narryn, and the two highest cards next to the king and queen are the master of the household, Hofmeister X, who was in charge of the court during the ruler's absence, and the marshal, Marschalk IX, in charge of any duty that involved the use of horses or carriages. With the exception of two subjects, the Jungfrawe, card VI in all suits, and the Trometer, card IIII in Germany and Hungary, all other personages are individual and don’t appear in any other suit.

The social rank of each one of the personages may be easily understood, according to the higher or lower value of the relevant card. For instance, the Doctor, Artzt, in Bohemia suit, would have shared more or less the same social rank as a Chaplain, Capplan, in Germany suit, or of a Chancellor, Kanzler, in Hungary suit, or of a Household Mistress of a queen or a princess, Hofmeistryn, in France suit, so all these subjects are featured on the eighth, VIII, card of different suits.

== Meaning ==
The Hofämterspiel takes its name from the positions held by most of the characters which the cards depict, positions which appear to have been standard feature of a princely court during the Middle Ages. The standard names by which the court positions are known to us today tell us simply what their bearers' duties originally were on a country estate. The word "marshal", for instance, is derived from the original designation for the servant in charge of horses, whose duties involved him in any activities where horses played the major role - in the course of journeys and campaigns, whenever quarters had to be found for the king and his entourage. With the growing importance of cavalry in times of war, the marshal's military duties were extended and in the field he became the field marshal.

However, unlike other known decks of the same age belonging to German culture, such as the Hofjagdspiel ("court hunting deck"), the Flemish Hunting Deck, and the Stuttgarter Kartenspiel ("Stuttgart deck"), the important is that the Hofämterspiel reflects the political relationships in Central Europe in the mid-15th century and was basically inspired by the standard social structure of royal courts during the late Middle Ages. Therefore, what makes these cards so interesting is the fact that not only their intrinsic value for the early history of playing cards are shown, but also the evidence they provide for the understanding of the social hierarchy and everyday life in late medieval courts.

The Hofämterspiel may not be the only deck of its kind. In the earliest known description of playing cards, there is a similar 60-card deck. Written by John of Rheinfelden in Freiburg im Breisgau in 1377, each of the four suits contained five court cards: king, queen, ober marshal, maid, and unter marshal. The ten numbered cards depicted various professions like baker, butcher, miller, and farmers. The so-called Mantegna Tarocchi from Italy, c.1465, also has a similar approach in ranking professions in a hierarchy or social order however it was used for educational purposes and not for a game.

The Hofämsterspiel contains a card called Küchenmeister, which might be the prototype of Franz Kafka's Oberköchin, or Head Cook in his novel "Amerika". Although a Küchenmeister is a master chef and not a head cook, their possible connection should not be disregarded.

=== Personages in the Hofämsterspiel ===
Note: Names that are not found in all four suits are highlighted in brown.

NUMBER OF THE CARD	THE SUIT OF BOHEMIA	THE SUIT OF FRANCE	THE SUIT OF GERMANY	THE SUIT OF HUNGARY
... (King)	König	König	König	König
... (Queen)	Königin	Königin	Königin	Königin
X (Household Master)	Hofmeister	Hofmeister	Hofmeister	Hofmeister
IX (Marshal)	Marschalk	Marschalk	Marschalk	Marschalk
VIII	Artzt (Physician)	Hofmeistryn (Household Mistress)	Capplan (Chaplain)	Kantzler (Chancellor)
VII	Kammermeister (Chamberlain)	Schenk (Cup bearer)	Truchseß (Steward)	Kuchenmeister (Master Chef)
VI (Lady-in-waiting)	Jungfrawe	Jungfrawe	Jungfrawe	Jungfrawe
V	Valkner (Falconer)	Koch (Cook)	Kellner (Wine Butler)	Schütze (Archer)
IIII	Trometer (Trumpeter)	Marstaler (Stable Master)	Barbier (Barber)	Trometer
III	Herold (Herald)	Hofschneider (Tailor)	Renner (Runner)	Fischer (Fishmonger)
II	Hefneryn (Potter)	Jeger (Hunter)	Bote (Messenger)	Pfister (Baker)
I (Fool)	Narr (Fool)	Nerryn	Narr	Nerryn

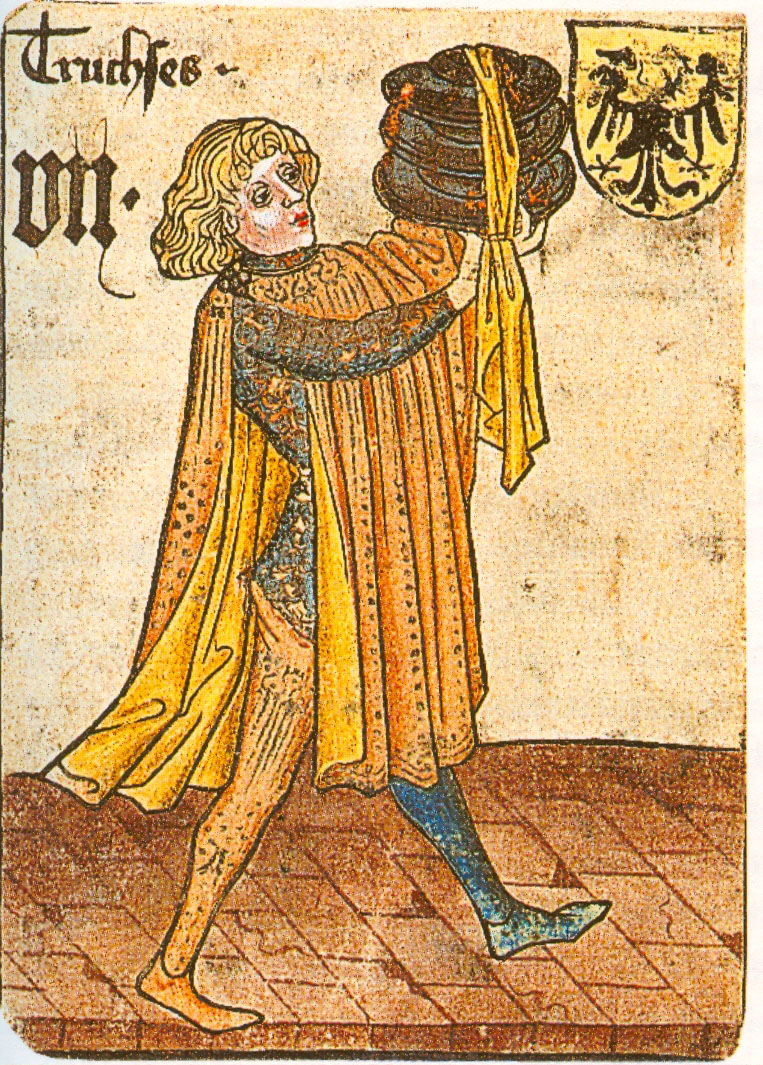
Der Truchseß

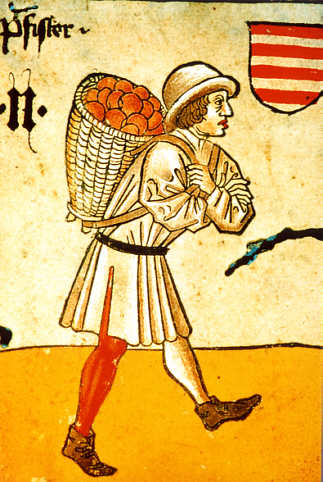
Der Pfister

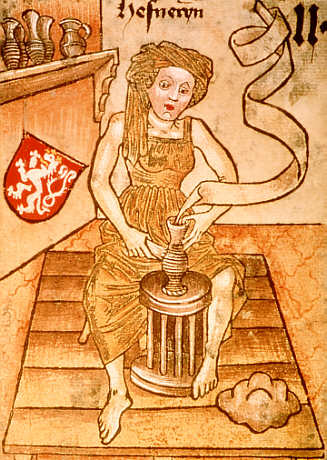
Die Hefnneryn

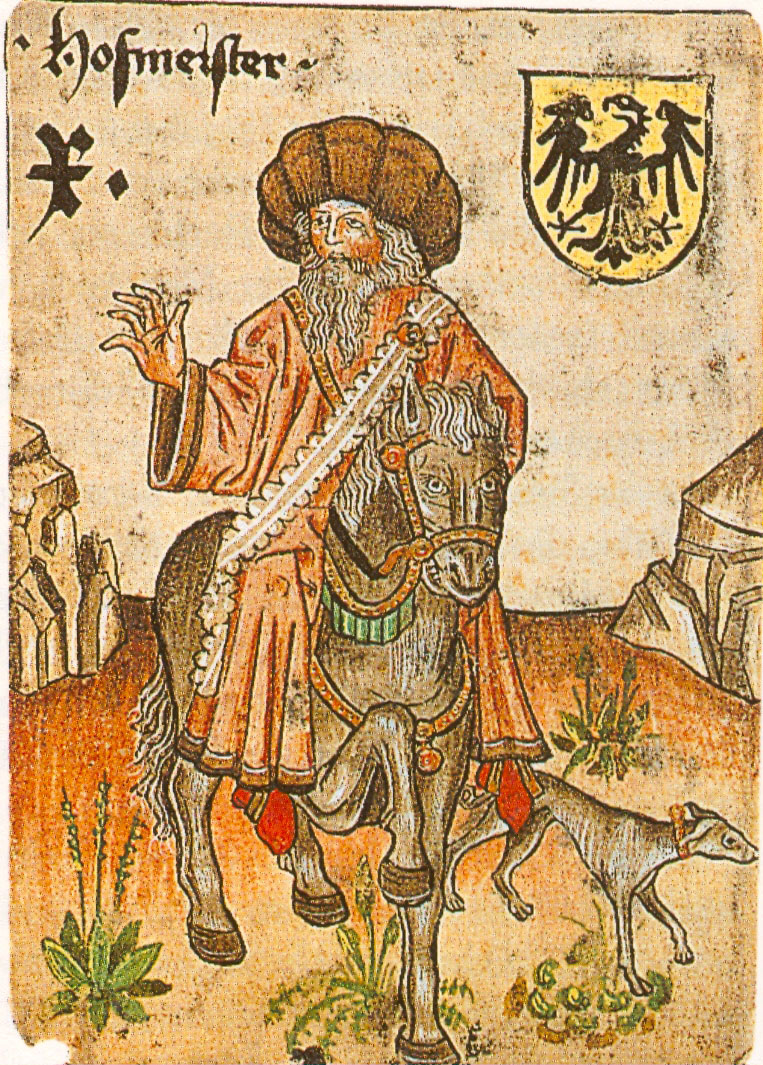
Der Hofmeister

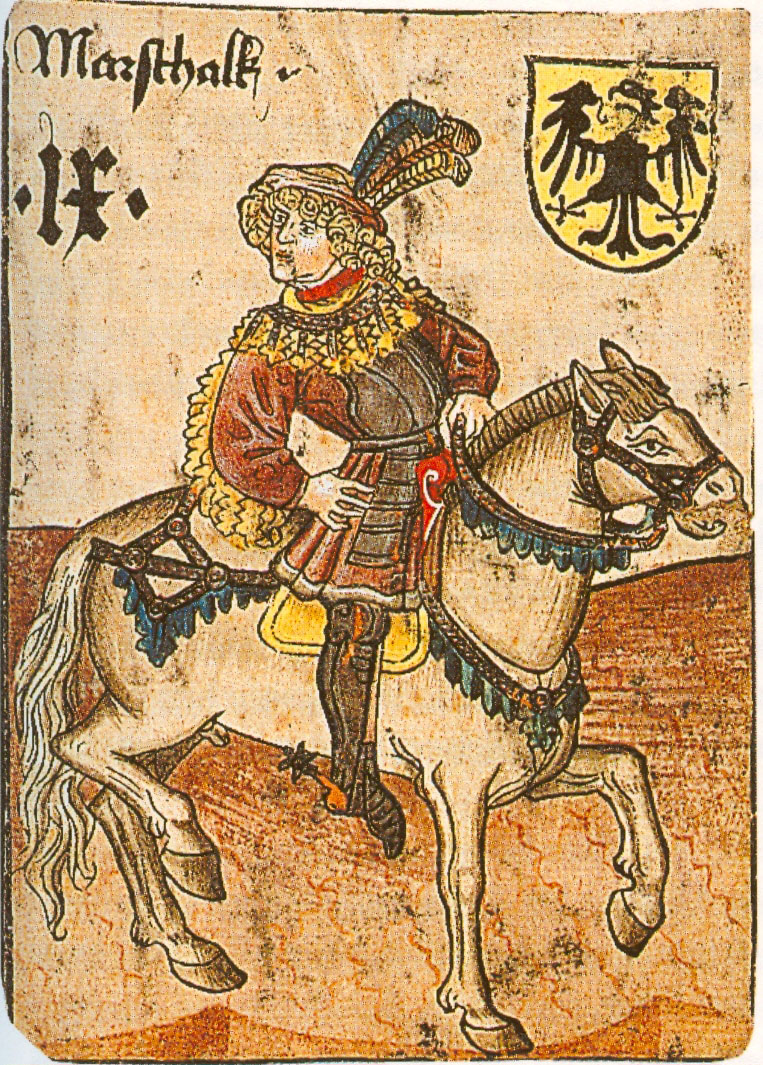
Der Marschall

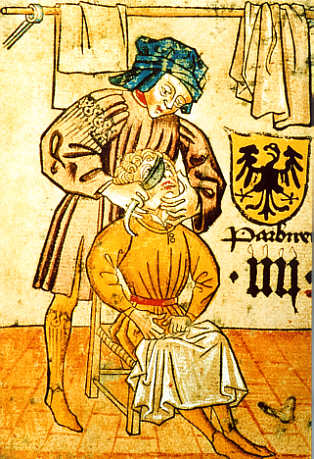
Der Barbier

== Use ==
Which game or games the Hofämterspiel was devised for is virtually impossible to tell, as no other source mentions the deck or its use, except the catalogue entry that describes Ferdinand of Tirol's belongings. The very fine quality of the cards, as well as the particular ranking scheme, suggest that the Hofämterspiel was likely used for playing a trick-taking game, in which the Narr and Narryn might have acted as jokers.

== Facsimiles ==
In 1976, Piatnik, in conjunction with the Kunsthistorisches Museum produced a limited edition facsimile of the pack as a boxed set of 48 cards and an accompanying booklet with commentaries by notable researchers.

== See also ==
- Flemish Hunting Deck, another 15th-century hunting pack
- Stuttgarter Kartenspiel, another 15th-century hunting pack
- Hofjagdspiel, a pack found together with the Hofämterspiel in Ambras Castle
- Karnöffel
- Ganjifa
- Tarot

== Literature ==
- Husband, Timothy B. (2015). The World in Play: Luxury Cards 1430–1540. New Haven and London: Yale University Press. pp. 49–70.
