= Ambraser Hofjagdspiel =

15th century Swiss set of playing cards

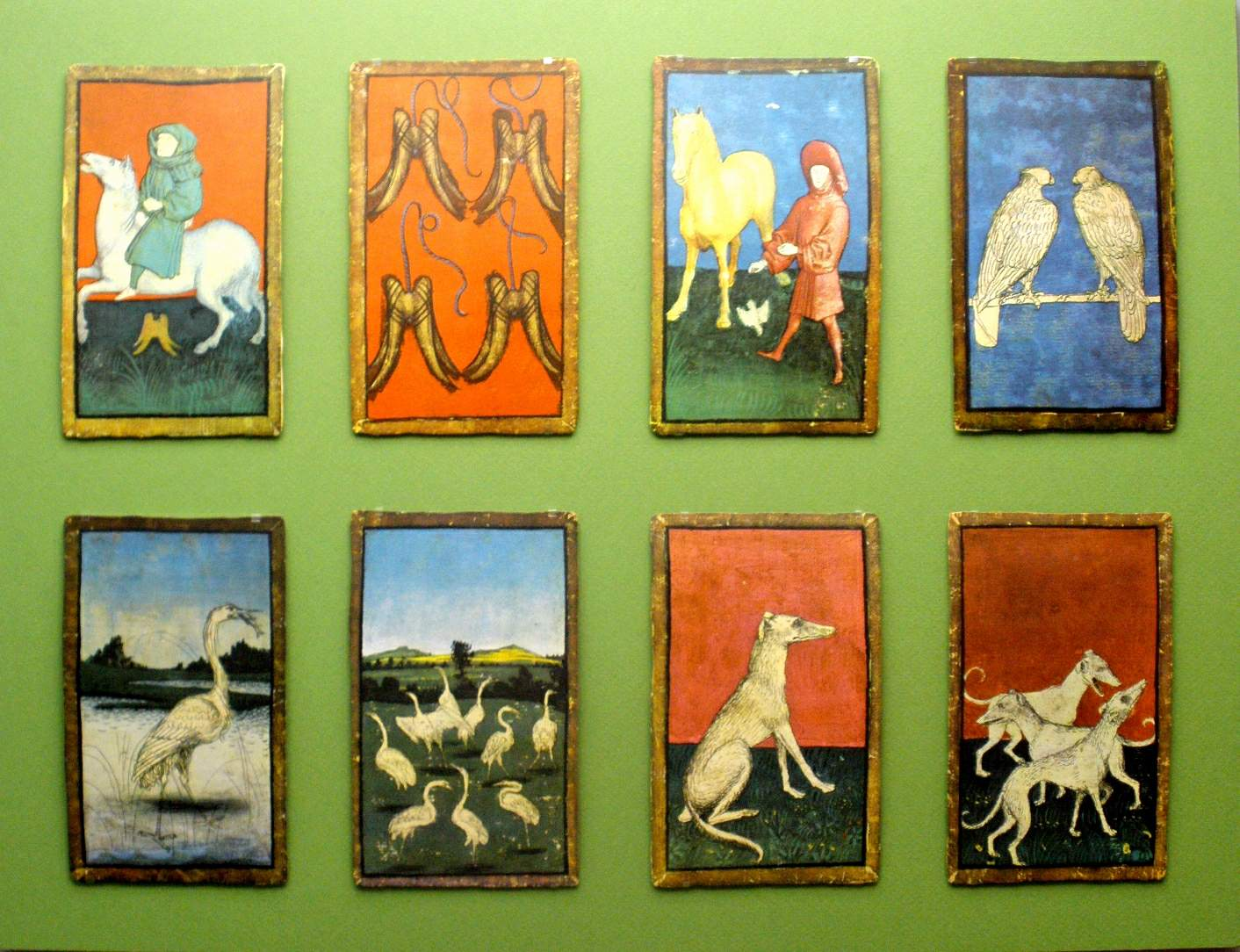
Facsimiles displayed in the Museum of Fournier de Naipes

The Ambraser Hofjagdspiel (Court Hunting Pack of Ambras; sometimes the Ambras falconer cards or the Courtly Hunt Cards) is a pack of cards painted around 1440–1445 and attributed to the engraver Konrad Witz from Basel, Switzerland. It originally consisted of fifty-six cards from which only 54 survive, all distributed in four suits, falcons, lures, hounds and herons, symbols related to hunting. Each suit contained ten pip cards with the 10s being represented by a banner like many old German playing cards and modern Swiss playing cards. There are four face cards per suit: the Unter, Ober, Queen, and King. It was found in a collection at the Ambras Castle, in Innsbruck, Austria, in the 16th century, and now figures as a precious item in the collection of cards of the Kunsthistorisches Museum (Museum of Art History) in Vienna.

== Facsimile ==
A facsimile of the pack was produced as a boxed set in 1995 by Piatnik in conjunction with the Kunsthistorisches Museum. It does not attempt to reproduce the missing two cards of the original pack.

== See also ==
- Flemish Hunting Deck, another 15th-century hunting deck
- Stuttgarter Kartenspiel, another 15th-century hunting deck
- Hofämterspiel, a deck found together with the Hofjagdspiel in Ambras Castle
