= Swiss-suited playing cards =

Card deck used in Switzerland

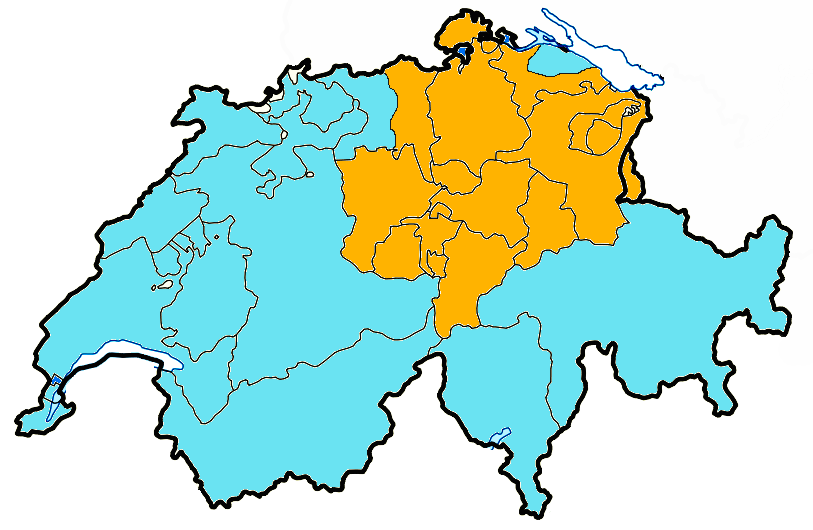
Distribution of French (blue) and Swiss (orange) playing cards in Switzerland and Liechtenstein

Parts of Swiss German speaking Switzerland have their own deck of playing cards referred to as Swiss-suited playing cards or Swiss-suited cards. They are mostly used for Jass, the "national card game" of Switzerland. The deck is related to the various German playing cards. Within Switzerland, these decks are called German or Swiss German cards.

Distribution of the Swiss deck is roughly east of the Brünig-Napf-Reuss line, in Schaffhausen, St. Gallen (and in adjacent Liechtenstein), Appenzell, Thurgau, Glarus, Zürich, all of Central Switzerland and the eastern part of Aargau. Unlike standard French-suited cards, the Swiss deck uses the suits of roses, bells, acorns, and shields, giving it a distinctive visual identity rooted in Switzerland’s regional card-playing tradition.

== Cards ==
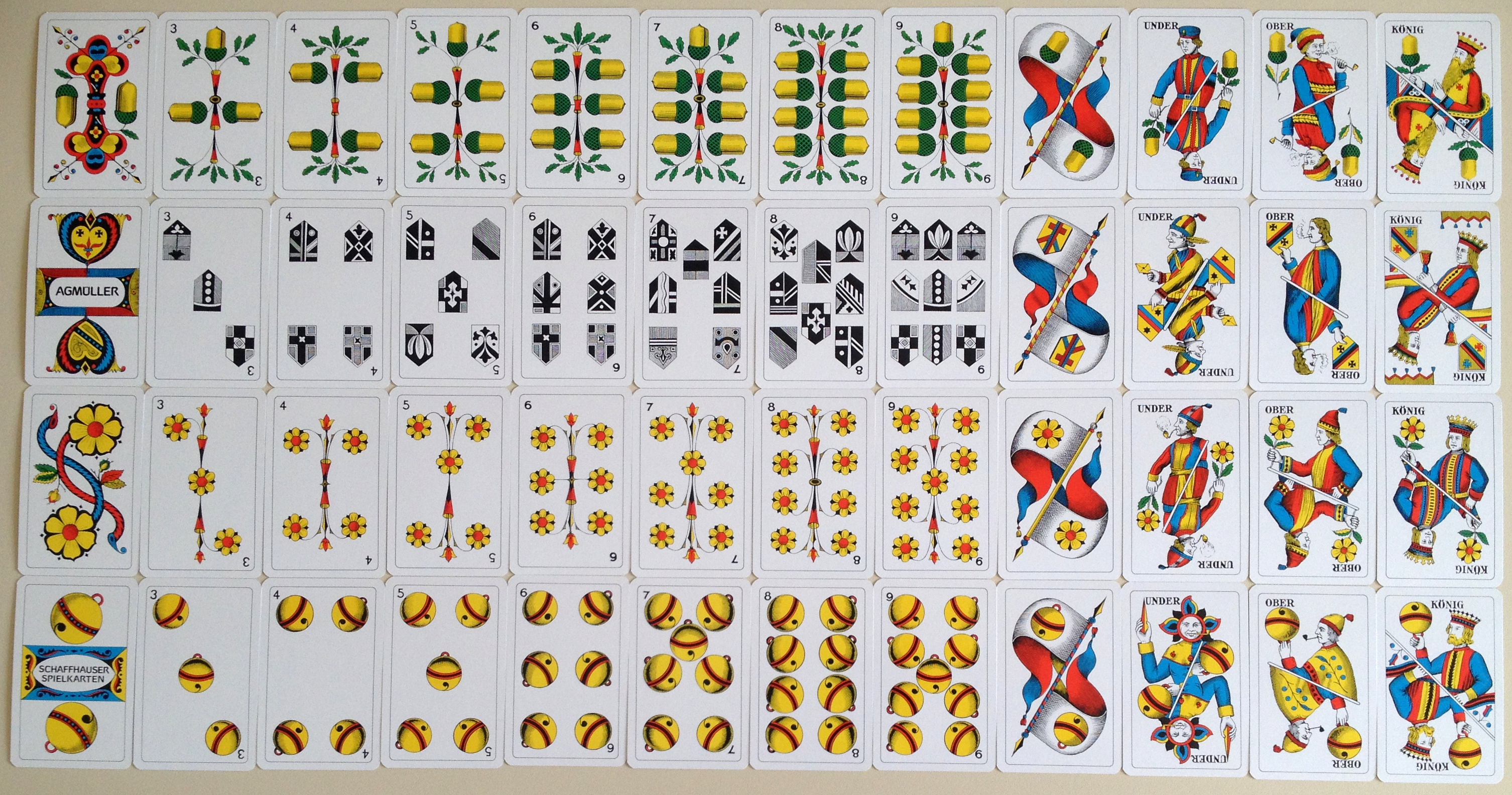
Kaiserspiel deck with all 48 cards

The suits are as follows:

Bells; Schellen	Shields; Schilten	Roses; Rosen	Acorns; Eicheln

The most common deck has 36 cards, nine of each suit. The card values are, in ascending order,

six, seven, eight, nine, Banner (ten), Under, Ober, König, As.

For the purposes of Jass, the numbered cards (six to nine) have no point value, the banner has a value of ten points, the picture-cards Under, Ober, König have values of two, three and four points, respectively, and the As has eleven points. The reduction to 36 cards (eliminating card values two to five) and the use of a male Ober instead of the "Queen" (perhaps related to the "Knight") is not unique to the Swiss deck but also found in a variety of German decks. Both "acorn" and "bells" are suits also found in German decks, while "shields" and "roses" seem to be unique to Switzerland.

A less common deck is the 48 card set containing the 3s, 4s, and 5s and is used to play the Karnöffel variant Kaiserspiel. The 36-card deck remains the standard format for Jass, Switzerland’s best-known traditional card game. The larger 48-card set preserves ranks that disappeared from the standard Jass deck, reflecting an older form of Swiss card play.

=== Face cards ===
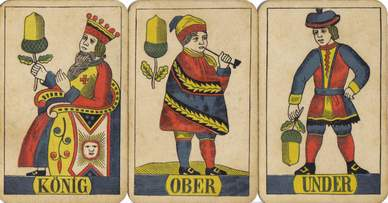
Early form of the "single image" variant of the deck, printed c. 1880 by J. Müller Cie, here showing the three face cards of Eicheln (acorns). The 1920s "double image" design which is now standard was directly based on this one.

The Under corresponds to the Jack or Knave. The Under of trumps becoming the highest card in the game can be traced to the 15th-century game Karnöffel. The face cards in the 1920s Müller design show twelve individual characters, which have remained unchanged since. The sequence Under, Ober, König depicts social stratification, the Under characters are working class, depicted as a fool or jester (Schellen), a messenger or scribe (Schilten), a peasant (Rosen) and a soldier or page/servant, while the Ober characters are shown as clerks or overseers/officers, while the kings are crowned monarchs (three of them seated, the king of Rosen is shown standing). The four Under characters hold their suit symbol facing downward, the Ober and König characters hold it facing upward (with the exception of Eicheln Ober and Schilten König, whose suit symbols are hovering in the top left corner without their holding it as they are holding a pipe and a cup instead, respectively). The distinctive orientation of the suit symbols helps visually distinguish the Under from the higher-ranking Ober and König figures.

Five characters are shown as smoking. All but three characters are shown with "blonde" (yellow) hair, the exceptions being Schilten Under, Schellen Ober (both with "grey" hair) and Schellen Under (hair not visible due to his fool's cap).

	Schellen	Schilten	Rosen	Eicheln
Under	A "fool" character facing the viewer, smoking a pipe. Schellen-Under also came to be used as a term for a "cripple", or for scary Fasnacht characters in Lucerne dialect.	Left profile, a messenger wearing a tasseled cap and holding an envelope, with a quill pen tucked behind his ear	Left profile, smoking a pipe, wearing a tasseled cap	Left semi-profile, wearing a beret cap
Ober	Left profile, wearing a tasseled cap, smoking a pipe	Left profile, the only bare-headed character, wearing a cloak and smoking a cigarillo or cigarette	Left profile, tasseled cap	Right semi-profile, tasseled cap, holding his pipe in his hand while exhaling smoke
König	Left semi-profile, forked beard	Left semi-profile, beardless, holding a cup	Left semi-profile, beardless	Left semi-profile, long beard

== History of production ==
The earliest references for playing cards in Switzerland date back to the late 1370s when they were sweeping through Western Europe. In 1377, the Dominican friar John of Rheinfelden wrote the earliest description of playing cards in Europe. He described the most common deck as consisting of four suits each with 13 ranks with the top three depicting a seated king, an upper-marshal who holds his suit symbol up, and an under-marshal who held it down which corresponds to the current court cards. Aces must have disappeared very early since there are no surviving aces with Swiss suit marks. It was far easier to print a 48-card deck with two woodblocks than one with 52 cards. The Deuce was promoted above the king around the late 15th-century to become the new ace. The current suit-system emerged during the 15th-century around the same time as the German suit-system after much experimentation such as feathers and hats instead of acorns and roses. Unlike the Germans, the Swiss have maintained the Banner 10 after the mid-16th century. During the 17-century, ranks 3 to 5 disappeared from most decks save for those used to play Kaiserspiel. The reduction to 36 cards created the standard deck still used for most forms of Swiss Jass today.

Basel was an early center for manufacturing packs. Two identical decks from around 1530 were independently discovered in 1998 and 2011. This predecessor went through various stages of evolution during the following centuries. Johannes I Müller of Diessenhofen printed an early such deck in 1840. His successor Johannes II Müller was the owner of the Müller company in Schaffhausen which printed a "single image" variant of the deck in c. 1880, from which it derived the "double image" design which is now standard in c. 1920.

Since the introduction of this deck, the various manufacturers of this deck can only be distinguished in minor design details, and in some cases by the company name printed on the aces of Schellen and Schilten. In this design, a central rectangle on the aces of Schellen and Schilten were used for the text "Schaffhausen & Hasle" (the location of the presses) and "Spielkartenfabrik", respectively. Also in the 1920s, a nearly identical design was produced by Hächler und Söhne of Zürich, indicated as "HASO" on the ace of Schellen. In designs derived from the 1920s Schaffhausen one, the ace of Schellen is still used to attribute the design to the original design, while the ace of Schilten is used to indicate the present manufacturer. The "single image" version survived into the 1950s, but became increasingly rare after 1920.

From the 1930s onward, the number of manufacturers increased. There was Walter Scharff Co. ("WASCO", Ennetbaden), 1930; "Bernina, Dauer-Jasskarten" (Otto Hauser-Steiger, 1939–1946), and others. The Swiss discounter Migros began selling playing cards in the 1940s. Their cards were only identified by an image of a crossbow on the ace of Schellen. Since they are otherwise identical to the Hächler Söhne ones, it is likely that this company produced for Migros.

More recently, cards were produced by Fotorotar (1985), Grolimund (Coloroffset R. Grolimund, Bern. M. Rhyn, Laupen), SwissCard (Toffen near Berne, 1997), Carlit (Carlit + Ravensburger AG, Würenlos, 2000s), Grob Druck AG (Amriswil, "www.jasskarten.com"), among others. Swiss AGMüller, the company continuing the original "J. Müller Cie" which came up with the 1920s design, was acquired by Belgian company Cartamundi in 1999. A number of German producers also made Swiss German decks for the Swiss market (Berliner Spielkarten, Nürnberger Spielkarten, VASS Leinfelden), as did the Italian company Dal Negro of Treviso.

There have repeatedly been novelty designs of the traditional deck, but all of these were short-lived, and intended as humorous or designed for a special purpose. There have been "feminist" designs which show all the face cards as women (Frauezogg, designs by Elsi Jegen and Susan Csomor), and there have been numerous novelty decks made for marketing purposes where certain cards had an altered design showing a logo or mascot of the company in question; an early "special edition" of the Swiss deck was a "military" version printed in 1915 on the occasion of the World War I mobilization; the suits became "cavalry, artillery, infantry, engineers". Swiss cartoonist Fredy Sigg designed a "cartoon" variant of the deck in 1978. In the 2000s, Austrian and German card producers also came up with "face-lifted", modernized designs for the Swiss deck, but these were not widely sold in Switzerland. AG Müller since its acquisition by Cartamundi in 2000 also came up with various "modernized" variants, sold under the name "Jass Plus". "Playing Cards R Us, Inc" of Orlando, Florida produced a "non-smoking" deck with 52 cards and two Jokers (copied from Csomor's feminist deck) in a very limited run of 50 decks in 2006. Since 2007, AG Müller has been selling Swiss suited poker sets with 52 cards plus three Jokers. These cards are wider than Jass ones and the pip cards are different; roses and acorns are no longer connected by vines and the shields are uniformly the same. They also use English corner indices for the face cards which meant giving the Queen index "Q" for the male Obers.

== See also ==
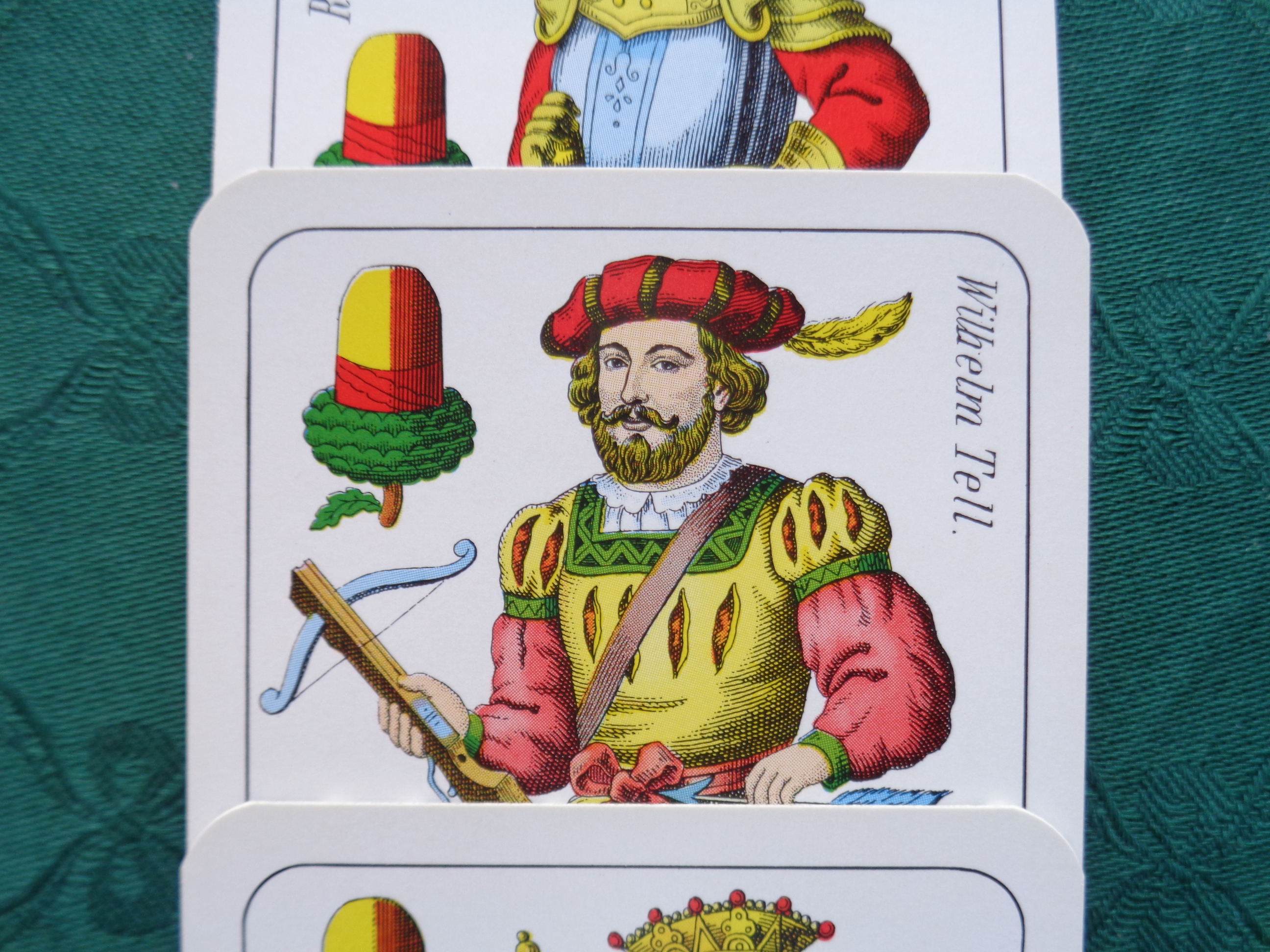
William Tell as the Eichel-Ober (Acorn Ober)

- German-suited William Tell cards - A "Swiss themed" deck, with cards depicting characters from Friedrich Schiller's Wilhelm Tell, designed as a means to express resentment against Habsburg Austrian rule. This deck is today known throughout the former Austro-Hungarian empire but it is not in use in Switzerland.
- Italian-suited Swiss Tarot - A 78-card tarot set used in pockets of Switzerland by the Romansh to play Troccas and by German Swiss to play Troggu.
