= Ober (playing card) =

Court card in German/Swiss playing cards

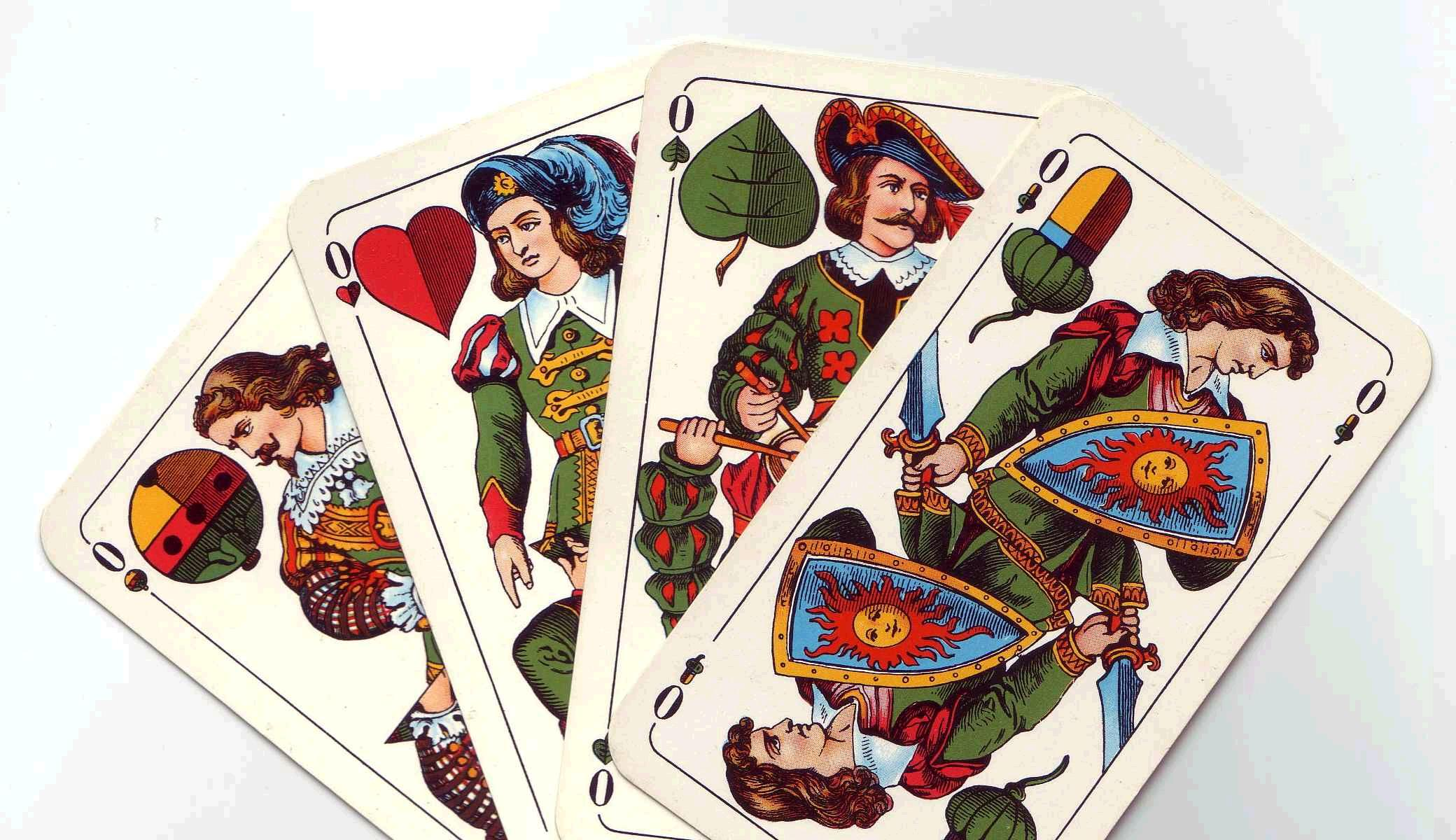
The four Obers in a German pack of cards (Bavarian pattern, Stralsund type)

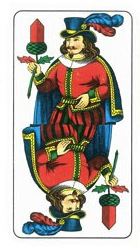
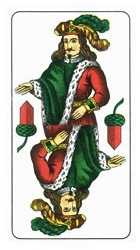
Ober and Unter of Acorns in a Saxon pattern pack

The Ober, formerly Obermann, in Austrian also called the Manderl, is the court card in the German and Swiss styles of playing cards that corresponds in rank to the Queen in French packs. The name Ober (lit.: "over") is an abbreviation of the former name for these cards, Obermann, which meant something like 'superior' or 'lord'. Van der Linde argues that the King, Ober and Unter in a pack of German cards represented the military ranks of general, officer (Oberofficier) and sergeant (Unterofficier), while the pip cards represented the common soldier.

The figure depicted on an Ober is usually a nobleman or officer. It is distinguished from the lowest court card, the Unter (lit. "under", formerly Untermann or "vassal", "subject", "subordinate"), by the figure's suit sign located in the upper range of the card. In the Württemberg pattern the Ober appears on horseback, as they were inspired by Cego packs whose face cards included a Knight or Cavalier as well as the Jack, Queen and King.

The earliest description of playing cards in Europe comes from John of Rheinfelden in 1377. He describes the recent introduction of cards in his region. For packs he regards as common, beneath the seated King were two marshals (cavalry commanders), with one holding his suit sign up while the other held his hanging down. This corresponds with modern Obers and Unters with the exception that they are no longer mounted on horseback.

Card packs that contain four Obers are used, for example, in Skat, Mau Mau, Bavarian Tarock and Schafkopf. By contrast, the packs used to play Gaigel and Doppelkopf have eight Obers. In Schafkopf, the four Obers are the highest trump cards, in Doppelkopf the eight Obers are the highest trump cards after the two tens of hearts. In the Bavarian card game, Grasobern, tricks that contain the 'Grass Ober' (i.e. Ober of Leaves) are to be avoided.

== Literature ==
- Campe, Joachim Heinrich (1811). "Der Untermann". Woerterbuch der Deutschen Sprache. Vol. 5. Brunswick.
- Dummett, Michael (1980). The game of Tarot : from Ferrara to Salt Lake City. London: Duckworth. ISBN 0-7156-1014-7. OCLC 7275570.
- Mann, Sylvia (1990). All Cards on the Table. Leinfelden: Deutsches Spielkarten Museum.
- Van der Linde, Antonius (1874). Geschichte und Literatur des Schachspiels. Vol. 2. Berlin: Springer.
