= Unter (playing card) =

Court card in German/Swiss-suited decks

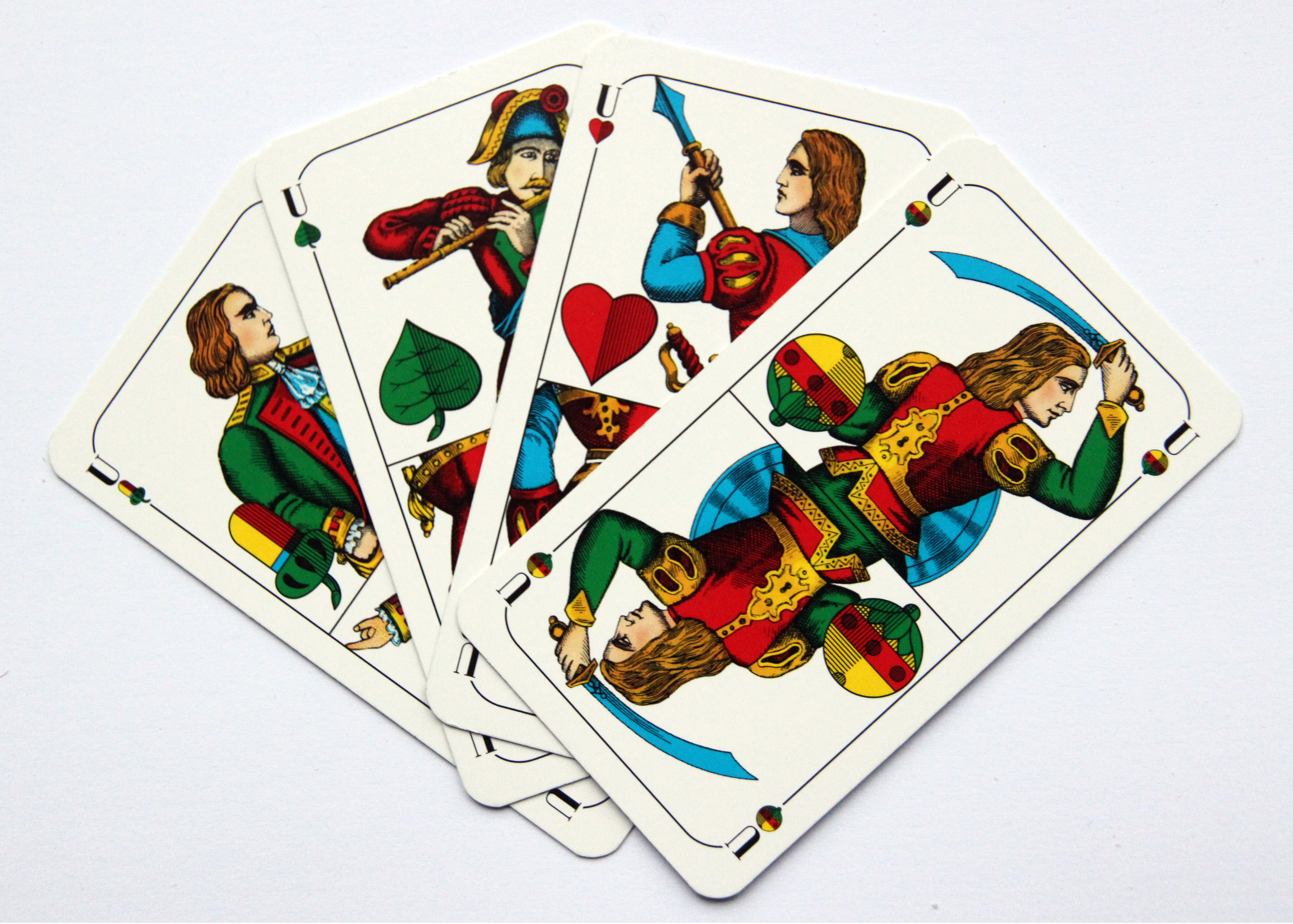
The four Unters in a German pack of cards (Bavarian pattern, Stralsund type)

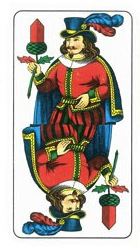
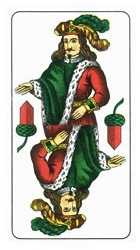
Ober and Unter of Acorns in a Saxon-pattern pack. Unlike the Ober, the Unter has the suit symbols in the middle.

The Unter, formerly Untermann, nicknamed the Wenzel, Wenz or Bauer, and (in Swiss) also called the Under, is the court card in German and Swiss-suited playing cards that corresponds to the Jack in French packs. The name Unter (lit.: "under") is an abbreviation of the former name for these cards, Untermann, which meant something like 'subordinate' or 'vassal'. Van der Linde argues that the King, Ober and Unter in a pack of German cards represented the military ranks of general, officer (Oberofficier) and sergeant (Unterofficier), while the pip cards represented the common soldier.

The Unter is distinguished from the Ober (lit. "over", formerly Obermann) by the fact that the suit sign is located in the lower part of the image on single-headed cards or in the centre of the image on double-headed cards. Unters or Untermänner were described soon after the introduction of playing cards in Europe. In 1377, John of Rheinfelden wrote that the lowest court card was a marshal (cavalry commander) who held his suit sign hanging down. It is likely that the horses were dropped to simplify production in the late 14th or early 15th centuries. In the Spanish pack, jacks are known as sota which also means "under", a vestigial remnant of their common origin.

The most common motifs used to depict the Unter are simple knights or even farmers. Packs with four Unters are used in card games such as Skat, Mau Mau, Bavarian Tarock and Schafkopf, while packs used in games such as Gaigel and Doppelkopf use eight Unters. In Skat games using the German style cards, and in German Schafkopf, the Unters are the highest trump cards.

The German nickname Bauer ("farmer") for the Unter has given rise to the name "Bower" for the Jack in certain English card games such as Euchre.

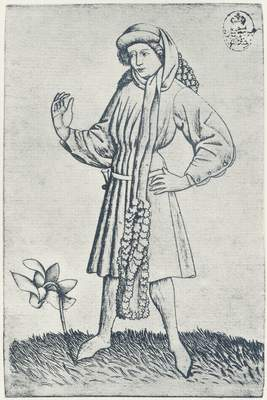
Early example: Unter with flower design, mid-15th century

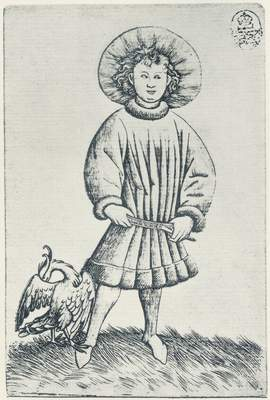
Early example: Unter with bird design, mid-15th century

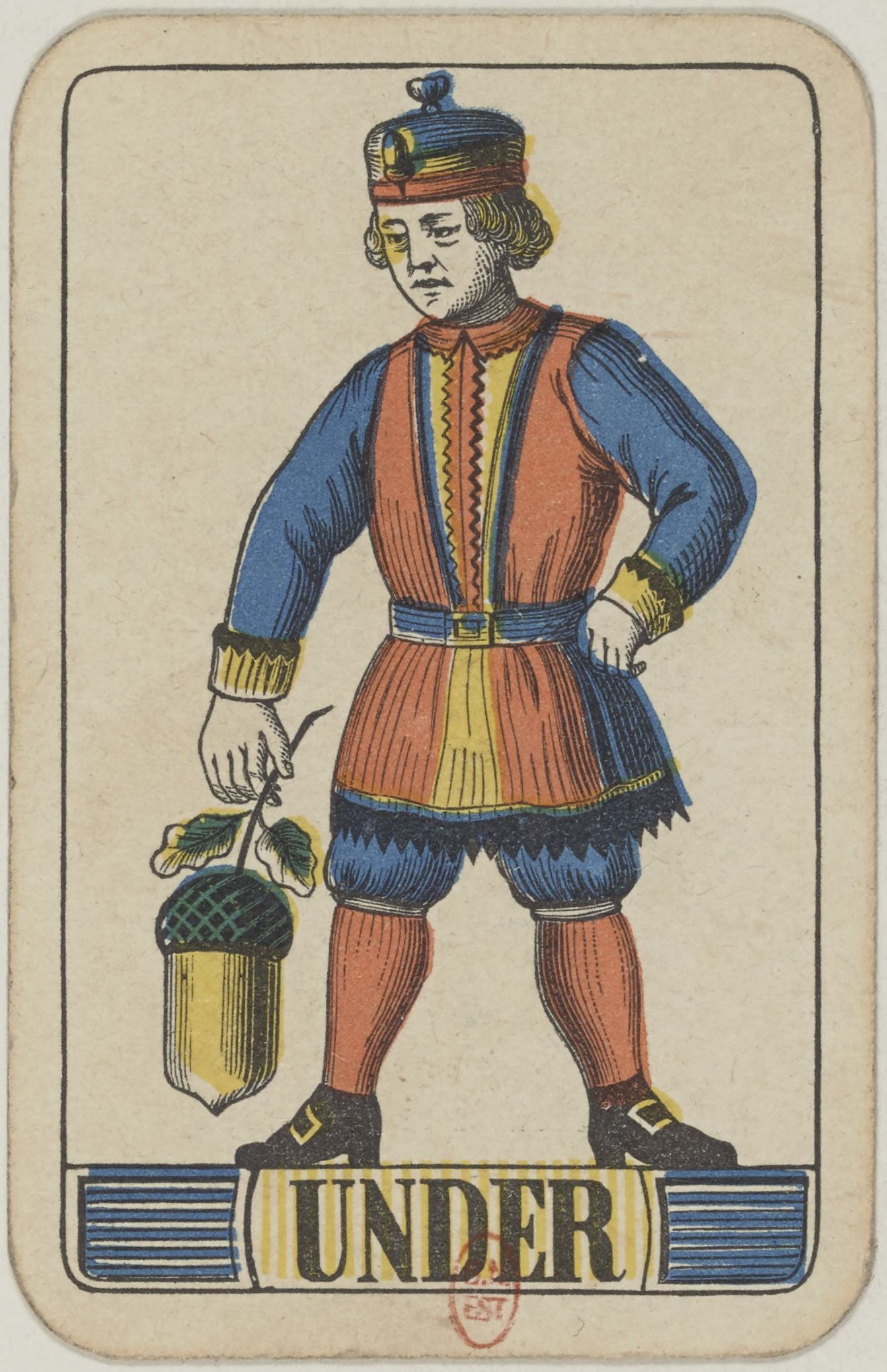
An Under of Acorns in a Swiss German pack, c. 1850, with the acorn near the bottom

== Literature ==
- Campe, Joachim Heinrich (1811). "Der Untermann". Woerterbuch der Deutschen Sprache. Vol. 5. Brunswick.
- Dummett, Michael (1980). The Game of Tarot. London: Duckworth.
- Van der Linde, Antonius (1874). Geschichte und Literatur des Schachspiels. Vol. 2. Berlin: Springer.
