= Polish bank =

Card game

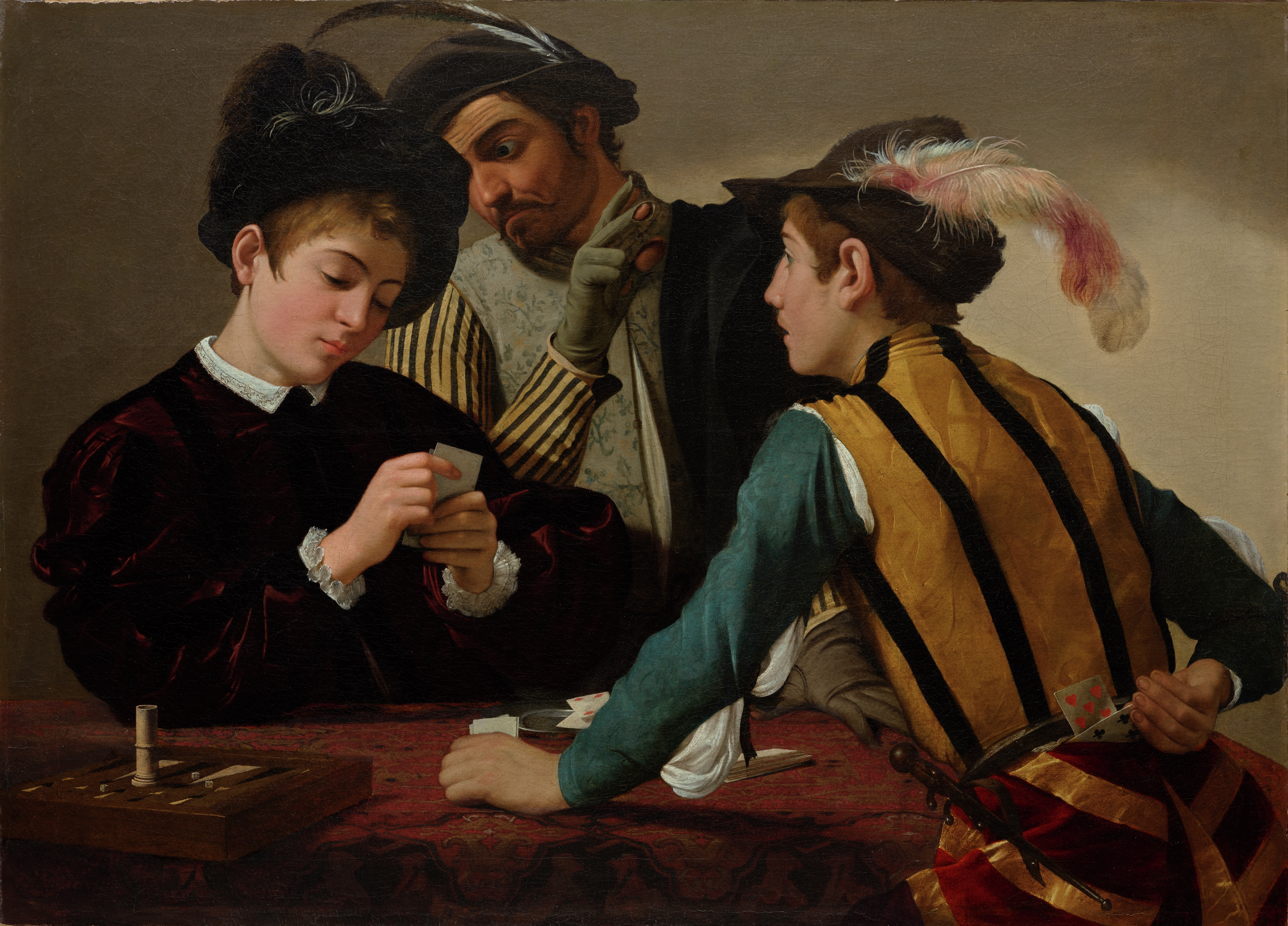
Michelangelo Merisi da Caravaggio: The Card Sharps (painting c. 1594)

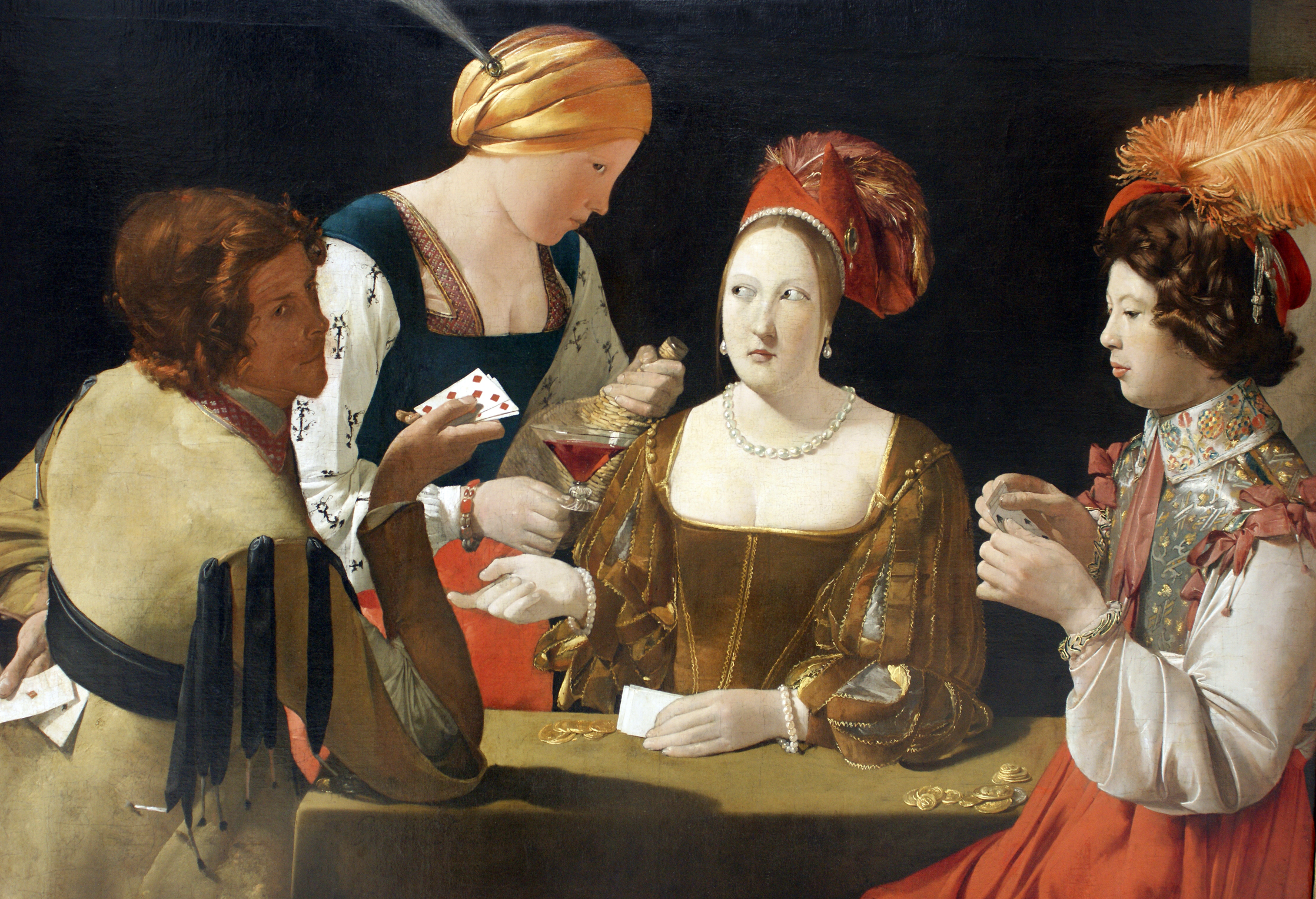
Georges de La Tour: The Card Sharp with the Ace of Dimaonds

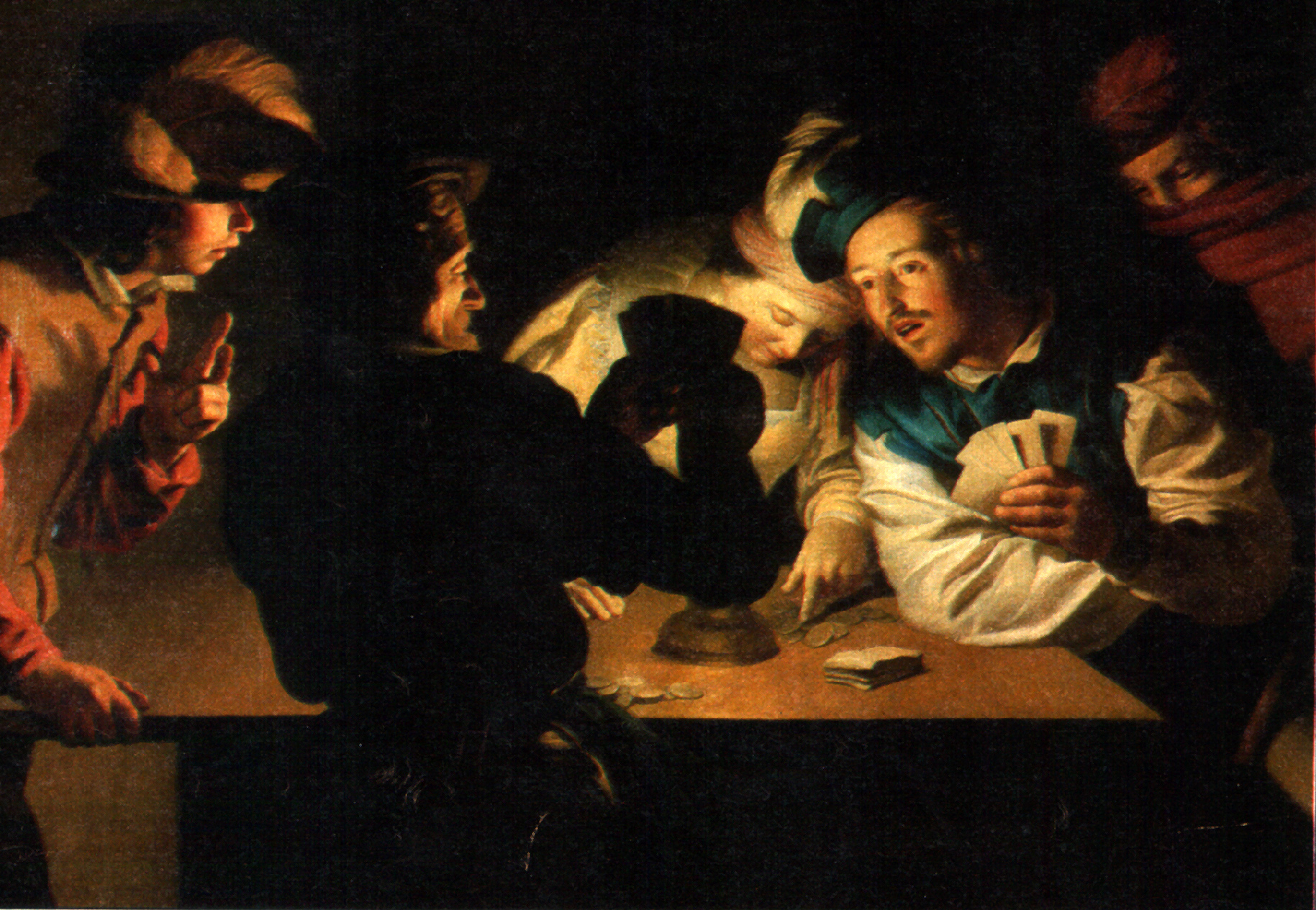
Gerrit van Honthorst: 'The Card Sharps

Polish bank (German: Polnische Bank), Polski pachuck, Grundehrlich, Polish red dog or stitch, is a gambling game using playing cards which resembles Häufeln and Mauscheln. The game is recorded as early as 1836 in the Austro-Hungarian Empire where it was banned on the grounds of being purely a game of chance or hazard.

== Rules ==
The game is played with a 52-card pack of French playing cards. The Ace is the highest card; the Two the lowest.

At the beginning of a game, the banker places an agreed fixed amount on the table in front of him. The other players now bet against it, but the sum of the opponents' bets must not exceed "half" the amount in the bank.

The banker shuffles, offers the pack for cutting and plays the first card face up to the table and then deals the next three cards are to the other players. If his opponents can beat the banker's card, i.e. if there is a card of the same suit and higher rank than the banker's among the three punters' cards, the opponents win in the ratio 2:1.

If the opponents cannot beat the banker's card, the banker collects the bets, thus increasing the bank total. The banker may not, however, take any winnings from the bank unless he surrenders the role of banker.

If the bank goes bust (gesprengt), i.e. there is no more money in the bank, the banker has to give the bank up and the player to his left becomes the next banker.

If the amount in the bank after a game is at least three times the original deposit, the banker may hold the bank for one last 'trick round'. After this game, the banker must hand over the bank to his left neighbour. If the bank is not bust after this round, the amount in the bank belongs, naturally, to the banker.

== Probabilities and bank advantage ==
The probability of a win for the punters is 30.38% and, for the banker, 69.62%. Due to the payout ratio of 2:1, this results in a bank advantage of 8.85%.

If a pack of 32 (Piquet pack or German-suited) cards is used instead of a 52-card pack, the probability of winning is 29.55% for the punters and 70.45% for the banker, increasing the bank advantage to 11.35%.

== See also ==
- Mauscheln
