= Bête (cards) =

Bête (from the French bête [bɛːt] = "beast", "dumb animal" or "brute"), Labet or the Germanised Bete and (Low German) Beet, is a term used in certain card games for a penalty payment e.g. for failing to take the minimum number of tricks, or for a stake or money which a player has lost.

In trick-taking game, such as Mistigri and Kauflabet, the player who has failed to win a single trick is "bête" or "the Bête". Likewise in Mauscheln, if the declarer, or Mauschler, fails to win a trick, he is called the Mauschlerbete.

The word is used with verbs in phrases that have further meanings:

- Bête sein ("to be [a] beast") – to have lost a game
- Bête machen ("to make [a] beast") - to bet or bid
- Bête ziehen – ("to draw [a] beast") - to win a card game
- Pott Beet - Low German for having lost badly e.g. without winning a single trick. (Note: This may refer to having to pay an extra penalty or Bête to the Pott i.e. pool or pot.)

The name is derived from the historical French card game of Bête where it referred to the stake and the penalty for losing. Labet is another name for the card game of Tippen and Bête also came to be a synonym for the card game of Mouche.

== See also ==
- List of German words of French origin
