= Kauflabet =

Historical German card game

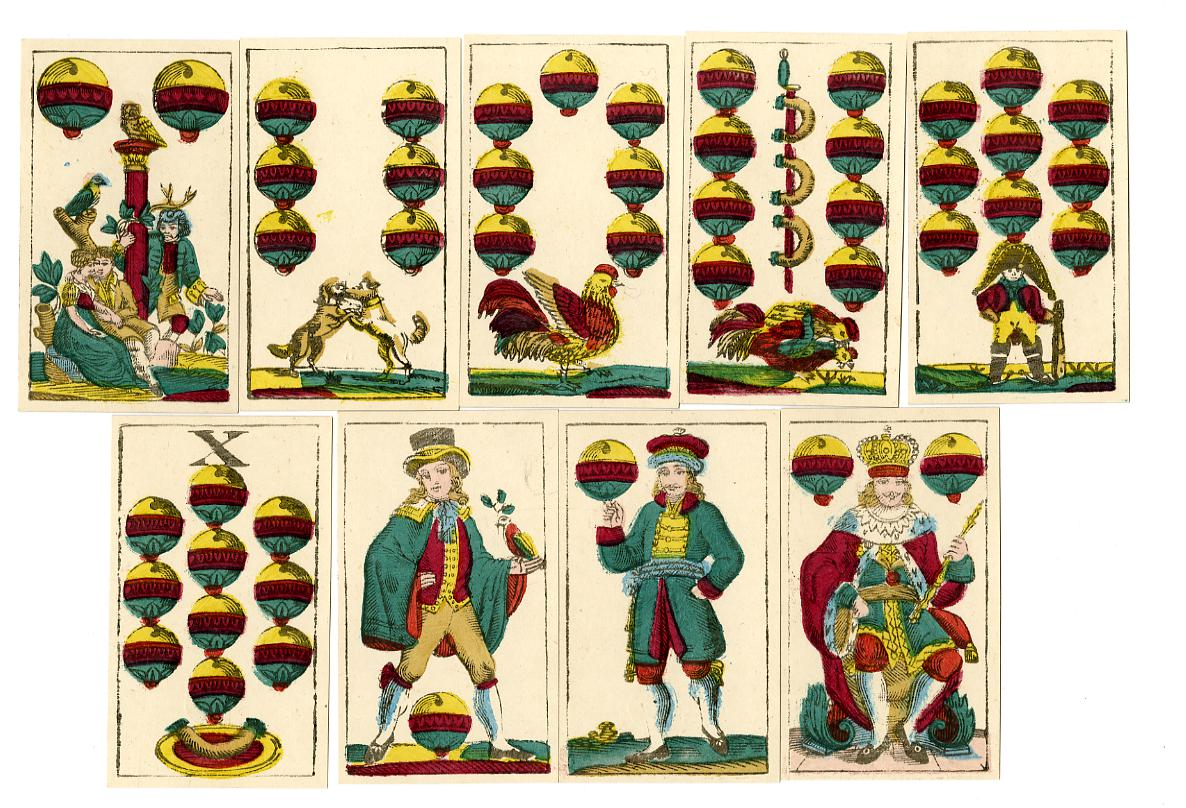
- Suit of Bells in old Saxon playing cards
- Origin: France
- Alternative names: Kauf-Labet
- Type: Plain-trick
- Family: Rams group
- Players: 3–5
- Age range: 12+
- Cards: 32
- Deck: Piquet
- Rank (high→low): K Q J A 10 9 8 7
- Play: Anticlockwise

Related games
- La Bête, Contraspiel, Rams
- Features: pot, 4 cards, exchanging, dropping out, 2 Jacks as top trumps

Kauflabet or Kauf-Labet is an historical German trick-taking card game for three to five players that was popular within women's circles.

== History ==
According to von Zwiedineck-Südenhorst, Kauf-Labet is recorded as early as 1684, and von Schnüffis mentions it in 1707, but its rules first appear in Corvinus in 1739. It was a simple gambling game, the name referring to the feature of exchanging or 'buying' (kaufen) cards and the penalty incurred for failing to take tricks (bête). Although it sounds as if it may be related to the old French game of La Bête, the latter had a different bidding process, no dropping out and more complex staking system.

We are told that it was a game played on holiday evenings alongside Hahnrey or Snip Snap Snorem. This classic version continues to be recorded during the 18th century, but in the mid-19th century a more elaborate description appears, akin to the Rams group in which players could drop out and in which the trump Jack is the commanding card and the Jack of the same colour is the second-highest trump. (Note: It is possible that these are one and the same game; the earlier description simply omitting the detail. However, the introduction of two Jacks in this fashion as the top cards appears first in Bester Bube and then not until 1802. This chimes with Parlett (2007).)

The game may have been prevalent in Swabia, Upper Saxony and the Ore Mountains as it is recorded in dialect dictionaries for those regions. It appears to have died out by the 20th century.

== Kauf-Labet (18th century) ==
The following rules are based on Corvinus' incomplete description of 1739, although there are several other very similar accounts:

Three or four players use a German-suited pack. (Note: German packs usually contained 32 cards at that time.) Each player receives four cards and the next is turned for trump. In turn, players now exchange as many cards from their hand as they wish with cards from the talon for as long as there are cards remaining. The trump upcard is picked up by the dealer. Once exchanging is complete, forehand leads to the first trick. The player with the most tricks sweeps the pot and any player who fails to take a trick pays a penalty either equivalent to the basic stake or to the amount in the pot.

== Kauflabet (19th-century) ==
The following rules are based on Meyer (1850):

The game is played by 2 to 5 players using a 32-card, French- or German-suited pack. Deal and play are anticlockwise. The dealer antes an agreed stake to the pot that must be divisible by four. He then deals four cards each and turns the next for trump. Beginning with forehand, players now announce in turn whether they will play or pass. If they pass, they lay away their cards and take no further part in the current deal. If they play, they may exchange their 'bad cards' (cartes fausses) with the dealer who replenishes their hands from the talon.

Forehand leads to the first trick and players must follow suit or, failing that, play a trump. A player who cannot follow must trump or overtrump if able. The trick is won by the highest trump or, if no trumps are played, the highest card of the led suit. The trick winner leads to the next until all four tricks are played. Cards rank in their natural order except that the trump Jack is the highest card and the Jack of the same colour is the second-highest. If German-suited cards are used, Acorns pair with Leaves and Hearts with Bells.

Each trick taken is worth a quarter of the stake or, if there are bêtes, a quarter of the pot. Anyone who fails to take a trick is Bête and pays a penalty equal to the stake or the contents of the pot and the next game is played for that plus the new stake.

== Bibliography ==
- Callenbach, Franz (1715). Puer centum annorum, sive, Heteroclitus repuerascentis mundi genius: Der vor Augen liegend- handel- und wandlenden Welt täglich anhaltendes Kinder-Spiehl.
- Corvinus, Gottlieb Siegmund (1739). Nutzbares, galantes und curiöses Frauenzimmer-Lexicon. Frankfurt and Leipzig: Joh. Friedrich Gleditschens seel. Sohn.
- Fischer, Hermann and Wilhelm Pfleiderer (1914). Schwäbisches Wörterbuch.
- Fraureuth, Karl-Müller (1914). Wörterbuch der obersächsischen und erzgebirgischen mundarten.
- Meyer, J (1850). Das große Conversations-Lexicon für die gebildeten Stände. Johann – Klapfa. Hildburghausen, Amsterdam, Paris and Philadelphia: Bibliographische Institut.
- Parlett, David (2007). "The Origins of Euchre". In: The Playing-Card, Vol. 35, No. 4. Apr–Jun 2007. pp. 255–261.
- von Schnüffis, Johannes Martin (Laurentius) (1707). Lusus mirabiles orbis ludentis: mirantische Wunder-Spiel der Welt. Kempten.
- von Zwiedineck-Südenhorst, Hans (1884). Zeitschrift für allgemeine Geschichte, Kultur-, Litteratur- und Kunstgeschichte, Volume 1. Stuttgart: Cotta.
