= Krypkille =

Swedish card game

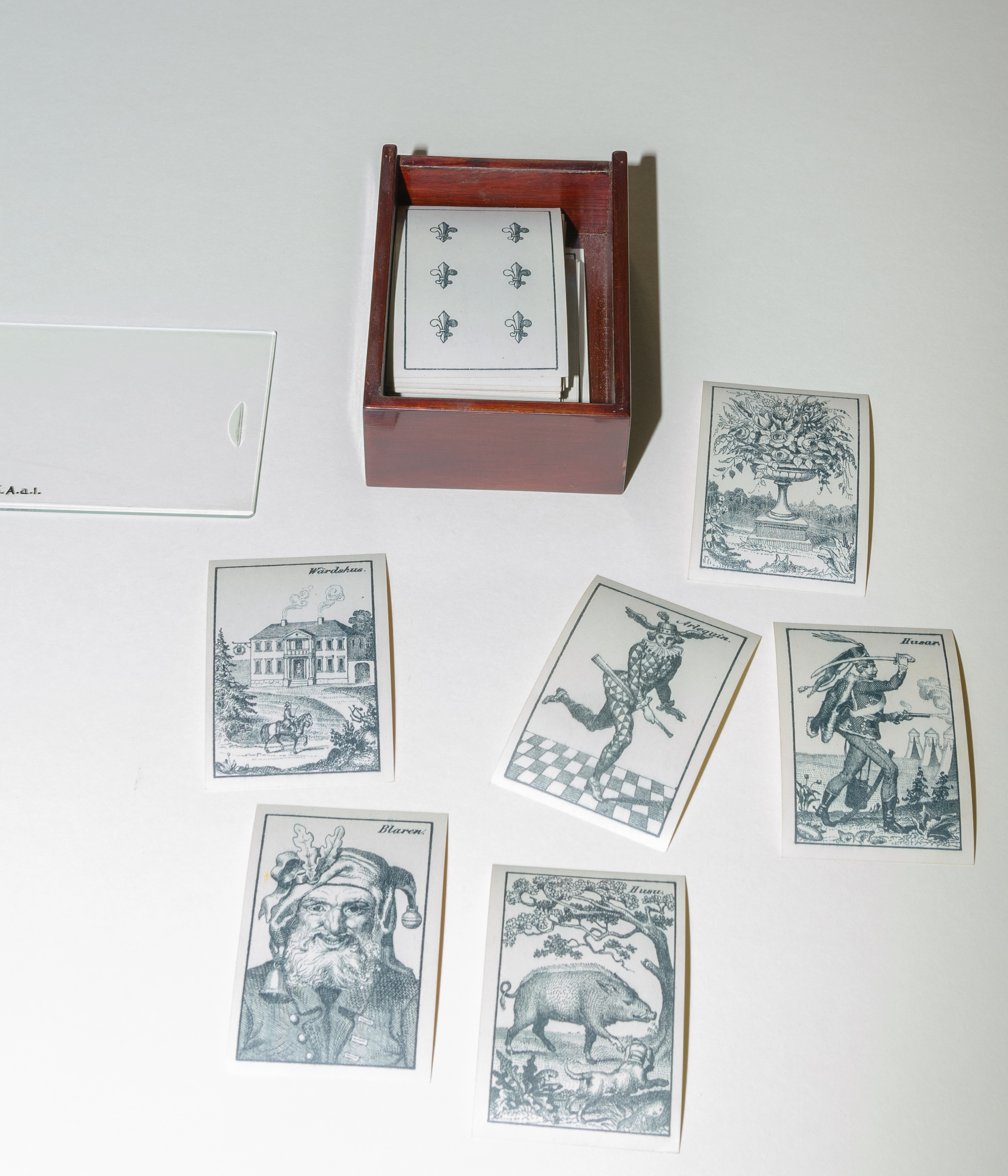
- Kille cards manufactured in 1897 in Stockholm by A Boman. From the collection of the Hallwyl Museum
- Origin: Sweden
- Players: 3 – 7
- Cards: 42 cards
- Deck: Kille cards

Krypkille ("Crawling Kille") is a Swedish card game that is played with a Kille pack. The game is similar to the game of Cucumber played with regular French-suited cards.

The dealer deals an equal number of cards to all players, as many as possible. Odd cards are put aside. In games with three, six or seven players—in which there are no odd cards because the number of cards in the deck is divisible with the number of players—the last card to each player is sometimes skipped and put aside, so that there are some unknown cards in the deal.

Krypkille is a trick-taking game. Players can either head the trick, i.e. play a higher card than the previous ones, or 'creep' (krypa, lit.: "crawl"), by playing their very lowest card. If two equally high cards are played, the second one beats the first except in the last trick when they are regarded as equal. The cards have the same ranking as in One-Card Kille, except that the Harlequin is always the highest card.

The player or players with the highest card at the end of a deal are eliminated and may not participate in the following deals. The game continues until only one player is left, who then becomes the winner.

== Variants ==
Krypkille may also be played with the additional rule that a player always must head the trick if possible.

Instead of eliminating the player with the highest card in each deal, you may award points to the winner and penalty points to the loser. In that case, the player with the lowest card at the end of a deal scores two points (if two equally low cards are played, the player who played the first of them scores one point) and the player with the highest card scores minus one point.

Sneaky Kille (Smygkille) is a variant where players get five cards each deal and may exchange one or two of them. In the variant Åland Kille (Ålandskille) the players get one card each in the first deal, two in the second and so on for as long as the cards last. Then you turn around and deal one card fewer in each deal. Minus points are awarded according to a special scoring scheme for the cards played in the last trick.

== See also ==
- Kille
- Femkortskille
