= Polskpas =

Card game

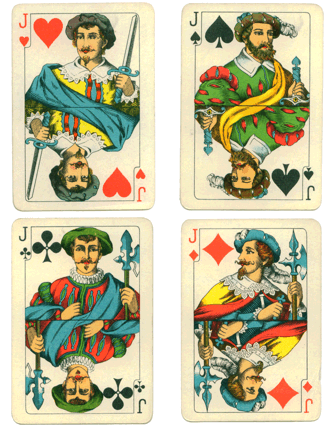
- The four Wenzels
- Origin: Denmark
- Type: Trick-taking
- Players: 4
- Cards: 24-card
- Deck: French-suited, Danish pattern
- Rank (high→low): (Js) A K Q 10 9

Polskpas, Polsk Pas, or Polskt Pass is a Scandinavian 5-card plain-trick game for four individual players using 24 cards. Eldest hand has the first right to accept or make trumps. As is typical for Schafkopf card games, which are normally point-trick games, the four Jacks are known as Wenzels and form permanent highest trumps. Polskpas is similar to the historical German game of Kontraspiel.

== History and etymology ==
The game appears in a Danish game anthology in 1774 as Polsk Pas, a Swedish game anthology from 1839, and in a Danish encyclopedia in 1924. An early literary reference to the game is a Swedish novel from 1753. Another early Danish literary reference to the game is from 1786.

The word pas in Danish has several meanings, the only one relevant to card games being "pass" i.e. to offer no bid. Thus both Polskpas (Danish) and Polskt Pass (Swedish) mean "Polish pass" which may refer to the 17th and 18th century Polish parliamentary procedure whereby every member had the right of veto which frequently led to anarchy. By extension, Polskpas may refer to the game feature which allows eldest hand to pass rather than being obliged to play with the turn-up suit, but then later change his or her mind.

A somewhat later German game known as Kontraspiel or Contraspiel is similar to Polskpas, but there are only two Wenzels and the bidding system is more elaborate.

== Rules ==
Tens are low. The Jacks or Wenzels are the highest members of the trump suit, ranking Clubs, Spades, Hearts and Diamonds in descending order. A Jack is not part of its natural suit unless this happens to be the trump suit.

Each of the four players receives 5 cards in batches of 2 and 3. The remaining 4 cards are not usually part of the game, except for the first of them, which is turned face-up to determine the preferred trump suit.

Starting with eldest hand, each player gets the chance to become soloist with the preferred suit as trumps. A player who accepts takes the turn-up card and discards a different card instead. If everybody passes, there is a second round in which each player gets the chance to become soloist with a different suit (and without exchanging the turn-up card). In the second round, eldest hand is the only player who is allowed to do this with the preferred suit. If the second round fails as well, the game is not played and the next dealer deals.

The standard rules of trick-play as in Whist apply. Eldest hand leads to the first trick. Suit must be followed. The player who played the highest trump, or the highest card of the suit led, wins the trick and leads to the next. To win the game one must win 3 tricks. To make sure that there is always a winner, it is also enough to be the first player to win 2 tricks, so long as the other tricks do not all fall to the same player.

== Scoring ==
The game is played for money and uses a pot for the stakes. The dealer pays one stake into the pot before the game starts.

If the game is won, the soloist sweeps the contents of the pot. If lost, the soloist doubles the contents of the pot.

On leading to the third trick, a soloist can announce "Vole!", an undertaking to win all five tricks. If successful, the soloist wins the amount being played for from each opponent. If the soloist wins the game but fails to take all the tricks, nothing is paid and the pot remains untouched.

== Variations ==
Three players can play following the same rules, provided that the Nines and one Ten are removed from the pack.

== Literature ==
- Hand-bibliothek för sällskapsnöjen, eller systematiskt ordnande spel, lekar och konster: Första delen, Tredje häftet. Stockholm: L.J. Hjerta. 1839. p. 299.
- _ (1846). Konsten att spela kort-, boll-, tärnings- och brädspel, m.m., 2nd Swedish edn. Upsala: Lundquist.
- Ferrall, J.S. (1845). Dansk-engelsk Ordbog (in Danish). Gyldendalske boghandel. p. 249.
- Henningsen, P.; Langen, U. (2011). Hundemordet i Vimmelskaftet: – og andre fortællinger fra 1700-tallets København (in Danish). Politikens Forlag. p. 120. ISBN 978-87-7692-251-1.
- Jørgensen, S. A. (1829), Nyeste Dansk Spillebog (in Danish), Copenhagen: Schubothe
- Kebslein (1774). Politiske Spille Regler for de tilladelige og meest brugelige Spii i Vertshusene; Copenhagen, re-issued by Scoop, 1974, 28 pp.
- Lundequist, Nils Wilhelm (1849). Konsten att spela kort-, boll-, tärnings- och brädspel, m.m.: Tredje häftet. Uppsala: Bokhandlaren N. W. Lundequist. p. 113.
- Markiewicz, Barbara (1993). "Liberum veto albo o granicach społeczeństwa obywatelskiego" [w:] Obywatel: odrodzenie pojęcia, Warsaw.
- Chr., Blanstrup, ed. (1924), Salmonsens Konversations Leksikon, vol. XVIII (2nd ed.), Copenhagen: Schultz
