= Zwicken =

Card game

- The 7 of Diamonds, the permanent trump
- Origin: Austria / Germany
- Type: Plain-trick
- Family: Rams group
- Players: 2-5
- Cards: 32
- Deck: William Tell or Piquet pack
- Rank (high→low): A K Q J 10 9 8 7 A K O U 10 9 8 7
- Play: Clockwise

Related games
- Contra • Kratzen • Lupfen • Mauscheln • Mistigri • Tippen
- Features: pot, 3 cards, 'hop and jump', 7♦ as 2nd highest trump

Zwicken is an old Austrian and German card game for 4 to 6 players, which is usually played for small stakes and makes a good party game. It is one of the Rams group of card games characterised by allowing players to drop out of the current game if they think they will be unable to win any tricks or a minimum number of tricks. Despite a lack of sources, it was "one of the most popular card games played from the 18th to the 20th century in those regions of what is today Austria."

== History ==
Zwicken is an old game. Unknown in the 1760s, it is first recorded in Austria in 1783 in Salzburg as a game of chance, played alongside Stichbrandeln, Brandeln, Aufkarten and Häufeln. Its name zwicken means "to pinch". The game was banned in Upper Austria in the late 1780s and in Styria and Bohemia in the 90s. This ban was extended to the whole of the Austro-Hungarian Empire by 1807. Nevertheless it continued to be played and its rules published during the course of the 19th century. In 19th-century Bavaria it was nicknamed Hombeschen [sic] after state minister von Hompesch introduced financial reforms that saw many pensions withdrawn or cut back.

== Cards ==
Zwicken is played with 32 cards of a William Tell pack (especially in Austria) or a Piquet pack. The suits are illustrated in the table below. Card ranking is: Sow/Ace > King > Ober/Queen > Unter/Jack > Ten > Nine > Eight > Seven. However, as the permanent, second-highest trump – the 7/7♦ – outranks all cards except for the Trump Sow.

Playing card suits
| French deck | | | | |
| German deck | | | | |
| Name of the suits | Hearts (Herz) | Diamonds (Karo) | Spades (Pik) | Clubs (Kreuz, Treff) |

== Description ==
Zwicken is a very common Austrian and German gambling game that is usually played for small stakes and makes a good party game. It is like a more intense version of the German game of Tippen – the general rules and mode of play are much the same – but there are significant differences, especially its permanent trump, the 7♦, and its 'hop and jump' (Hupf und Sprung) element, in which, like Kratzen and Austrian Lampeln, the role of dealer may 'hop' to the next player or 'jump' over one or more players as a result of the cut. As in all games of the Rams group, players may always drop out of a particular deal at the start.

The main differences from Tippen are outlined below and are based on Katira, except where stated.

- Permanent Trump. 7♦ / 7 is the permanent, 2nd-highest trump, ranking just below the Trump Ace / Sow.
- Hop and Jump. Between shuffling and dealing, the player sitting to the right of the dealer (rearhand) cuts the cards and reveals the lowest card. If it is an Ace / Sow or Seven, the deal passes to the next player without playing, but the dealer's stake remains in the pool and the next dealer also pays 3 units von Alvensleben 1853, pp. 201ff. (Note: von Alvensleben describes, as a variant, that the deal passes to the next player but one, and both the new dealer and the skipped player pay 3 units into the pool.) If it is the 7♦ / 7, the deal passes to the rearhand in clockwise order and both he and all the players in between pay the basic stake of 3 units.
- Trump Ace. The player with the Trump Ace / Sow must play it the first time he is leading to a trick.

== Play ==
The aim is to win as many tricks as possible. After the dealer has been decided, taking account of any 'hop' or 'jump' as described above, he antes 3 chips to the pot and deals 2 cards to each player, turns the next for trump and then deals a third card to each player. At this point, beginning with forehand, players may exchange up to 3 cards with the talon or announce that they will "pass" and drop out of the current deal. Forehand leads to the first trick. Players must follow suit if possible; otherwise must trump and must head the trick if they can. The winner is the player with the most tricks.

== Scoring ==
Players earn a third of the pot for each trick taken. In addition a player is gezwickt (i.e. has lost) and pays a basic stake if:

- he plays and fails to take a trick
- as the dealer, he fails to check the lowest card
- he has the Trump Ace and does not lead it to a trick at the first opportunity
- he has the 7♦ / 7 and loses it to the Trump Ace.

== Anbieten, Freibieten and Sticheln ==
An historical variant of Zwicken was played in which only the last trick counted. This was variously known as Anbieten, Freibieten or Sticheln, and was banned, for example, in Upper Austria as in 1825 because it was "very similar to the forbidden card game of Zwicken and belongs to those games in which winning and losing depend more on the luck of the cards than on the skill of the player" and "because the stake could be increased time and again by the declarer" (Freibieter). It was probably also played in Bavaria as it is mentioned in the Bavarian Dictionary in 1836.

This variant should not be confused with Sticheln, another Austrian game which resembles Whist.

== See also ==
- Tippen or Dreiblatt

== Literature ==
- von Alvensleben, Ludwig (1853), Encyklopädie der Spiele (in German), Leipzig: Otto Wigand
- Danyliuk, Rita (2017). 1x1 der Kartenspiele (in German) (19th ed.). Hanover: Humboldt. ISBN 978-3-86910-367-9.
- Edler von Lützenau, Alois (1846). Handbuch der Gesetze und Verordnungen, welche sich auf den zweiten Theil des Strafgesetzbuches über schwere Polizei-Übertretungen beziehen (in German). Vol. 2. Vienna: Carl Ueberreuter. p. 392.
- Geiser, Remigius (2004). "100 Kartenspiele des Landes Salzburg" (PDF) (in German). Austro-Hungarian Playing-Card Association, Vienna/Budapest. Archived from the original (PDF) on 27 August 2018.
- Katira, Kay Uwe (1983). Verbotene Kartenspiele (in German). Munich: Wilhelm Heyne. ISBN 3-453-41550-7.
- Schmeller, Johann Andreas (1836). "Der Stichel". Bayerisches Wörterbuch: Sammlung von Wörtern und Ausdrücken (in German). Vol. 3 (Digitized 10 May 2012 ed.). Cotta. p. 609.
- Weber, Karl Julius (1855). Deutschland, oder Briefe eines in Deutschland reisenden Deutscher [Germany, or letters from a German travelling in Germany] (in German). Vol. 1–2. p. 332.
- Zollinger, Manfred (March–April 1998). "The 'Very Costly Game' of Zwicken". The Playing-Card. Vol. 26, no. 5. pp. 150–154.
