= Mistigri (card game) =

German card game

- The "Mistigri" or "Mönch"; the highest trump and wild card
- Origin: France
- Type: Point-trick
- Family: Rams group
- Players: 3 or 4
- Age range: 12+
- Cards: 32
- Deck: French or German
- Rank (high→low): A K O U 10 9 8 7 A K Q J 10 9 8 7
- Play: Clockwise

Related games
- Contra • Kratzen • Loo • Lupfen • Mauscheln • Ramscheln • Tippen • Zwicken
- Features: pot, 5 cards, mistigri as top trump, 5-card flush as winning hand

Mistigri, historically Pamphile, is an old, French, trick-taking card game for three or four players that has elements reminiscent of poker. It is a member of the Rams family of games and, although it is a gambling game, often played for small stakes, it is also suitable as a party game or as a family game with children from the age of 12 upwards.

== Name ==
Mistigri is a variant of Mouche or Lenterlu and a cousin of the English Lanterloo. It is known in Germany as Mönch ("monk"), possibly a corruption of the French Mouche as Monche was the old German for monk. Meyer certainly equates it to Mouche, Lenturla and Pamphile, while Grupp also states that it is known as trente et un ("thirty-one") in French, but Méry's research shows that Mistigri was derived from Mouche (which was also called Lenturlu) and was first named Pamphile. It is related to the historical card game of Tippen.

The game is named after the "mistigri" (French for "pussy cat" or "kitten"); both it and "Mönch" ("monk") are nicknames for the jack of clubs or Unter of acorns, which may be used as the highest trump and as a wild card.

== History ==
Mistigri is a card game that has been known and documented over several centuries. According to Kastner & Folkvord, it was predominantly played in bars and among families, but gained a "rather dubious reputation" as a gambling game. Mistigri was developed from an older French game known as Mouche ("Fly") or Lenturlu during the 18th century. Mistigri was originally called Pamphile, but the term 'mistigri' came into use during the 19th century as a nickname for the Jack of Clubs and gave its name in turn to the game. According to Méry, Pamphile and Mistigri are therefore the same game and a variant of Mouche or Lenturlu. Of course, in the English game of Loo or Lanterloo the Jack of Clubs was christened "Pam" after Pamphile.

The game of Loo, also known as "Lanterloo", which is well known in the English-speaking world as a 5-card or 3-card game and was derived from French Lenturlu, is thus a cousin of Mistigri. Also related to it in the German-speaking world are the well-known games of Ramscheln and Mauscheln, in which only one player may exchange his hand cards against the so-called widow. In France it developed into the game of Bourré; in Spain into Julep and, building on Loo, in Ireland into Irish Loo. Other variants of the game are Norseman's knock, cucumber, toepen and Hasenpfeffer.

== Cards ==
Mistigri is a trick-taking game, but it also contains elements that resemble the game of poker. It is usually played by three or four players with a 32-card German-suited pack. If more play, a 52-card French pack may be used. The cards rank as follows: A > K > O > U > 10 > 9 > 8 > 7. Card values, which only count in determining a winning flush, are as follows:

- Ace (deuce) – 11 points
- King, Ober, Unter and ten – 10 points
- Nine, eight, and seven – 9, 8, and 7 points respectively

== Playing ==
The following rules are based on Grupp (1975).

=== Preliminaries ===
Each player pays the agreed stake (a chip or coin) into a pot. Then, beginning with forehand to his left, the dealer deals a packet of three cards to each player, followed by a second packet of two cards; each player receiving a hand of five cards. The next card is turned as trumps.

In clockwise order, beginning with forehand, players decide whether to "pass" (ich passe or je passe), e.g. if they have a poor hand, and drop out of the particular game in progress or to announce "I'll join in" (ich gehe mit or je m'y tiens) or "play" (c'est bon). The active players may now, in rotation again, lay face down as many of their hand cards as they wish and exchange them for the same number of cards from the talon. They need not exchange any, of course.

The aim of exchanging is either to acquire a flush of five cards of the same suit or, failing that, to acquire as many high value cards or trump cards as possible.

=== Fliege ===
A player who succeeds in getting a five-card flush, a so-called mouche or Fliege ("fly"), wins immediately and takes the entire contents of the pot. The five cards do not have to form a sequence. The other players have to pay another stake to the pot. If two players have a flush, the one with the trump flush wins. If neither has a trump flush, the winner is decided on card points, where Ace = 11, Courts = 10 and pip cards count their natural value.

=== Play ===
If no-one has a flush, the game proceeds to the trick-taking phase. Forehand leads to the first trick and the winner of the trick leads to the next. Players must follow suit (Farbzwang) if they can, trump if they cannot follow (Trumpfzwang) and must head the trick if possible (Stichzwang).

=== Winnings ===
For each trick taken, the player earns a fifth of the pot. If a player takes no tricks, they must pay the basic stake as a penalty.

=== Mistigri ===
The feature of this member of the rams family is the Mistigri, the jack of clubs or Unter of acorns, which is always the highest trump regardless of the trump suit. The player holding this card may play it and, at the same time, announce any suit of his choice as trumps. The Mistigri also counts as a wild card in that, if a player has 4 cards of the same suit, the Mistigri may be counted as the 5th in order to make a flush.

== Mönch ==
Mönch, as described by Kastner and Folkvord, has a few slight variations or refinements. A 36-card or 52-card pack, depending on the number of players, is used and each player has 25 chips, the basic stake being five. Exchanging is limited to 4 cards maximum and there is provision for the discards to be shuffled and used for further exchanging if the talon is exhausted. In the event of two players having a flush, the player with the lower flush does not have to pay a penalty nor does the player with the Mönch. The pot has a limit of 40 chips, any excess going into a side pot which tops up the main pot when it drops below 40. If all players pass, the dealer gets 5 chips from rearhand. Game may be a fixed number of points, e.g. 50, or a set number of deals. If forehand plays the trump ace to the first trick, he or she can insist that the Mönch 'keeps still' (still hält - see "Pam be civil" in Loo) and is not played to that trick. Finally, if clubs are the trump suit, players may not drop out (see 'club law' in Loo).

== Literature ==
- Alvensleben, L. von (1853) "Mistigri" in Encyklopädie der Spiele, enthaltend alte bekannten Karten-, Bret-, Kegel-, Billard-, Ball-, Würfel-Spiele und Schach, Otto Wiegand, Leipzig, pp. 323–325.
- Grupp, Claus D. (1975). "Mistigri" in Kartenspiele. Falken-Verlag Erich Sicker, Wiesbaden. ISBN 3-8068-2001-5.
- Kastner, Hugo and Gerald Kador Folkvord (2005). "Mönch" in Die große Humboldt-Enzyklopädie der Kartenspiele (= Humboldt-Taschenbuch. Freizeit & Hobby. Vol. 4058). Schlütersche Verlagsgesellschaft, Baden-Baden. ISBN 3-89994-058-X.
- Méry, Joseph (1847). L'Arbitre des jeux, Paris, Gabriel de Gonet.
- Meyer, Hermann Julius (1905). "Mistigri" in Meyers Großes Konversations-Lexikon, Vol. 13. Leipzig, 1908.
