= Lupfen (card game) =

Card game for 3 to 5 players

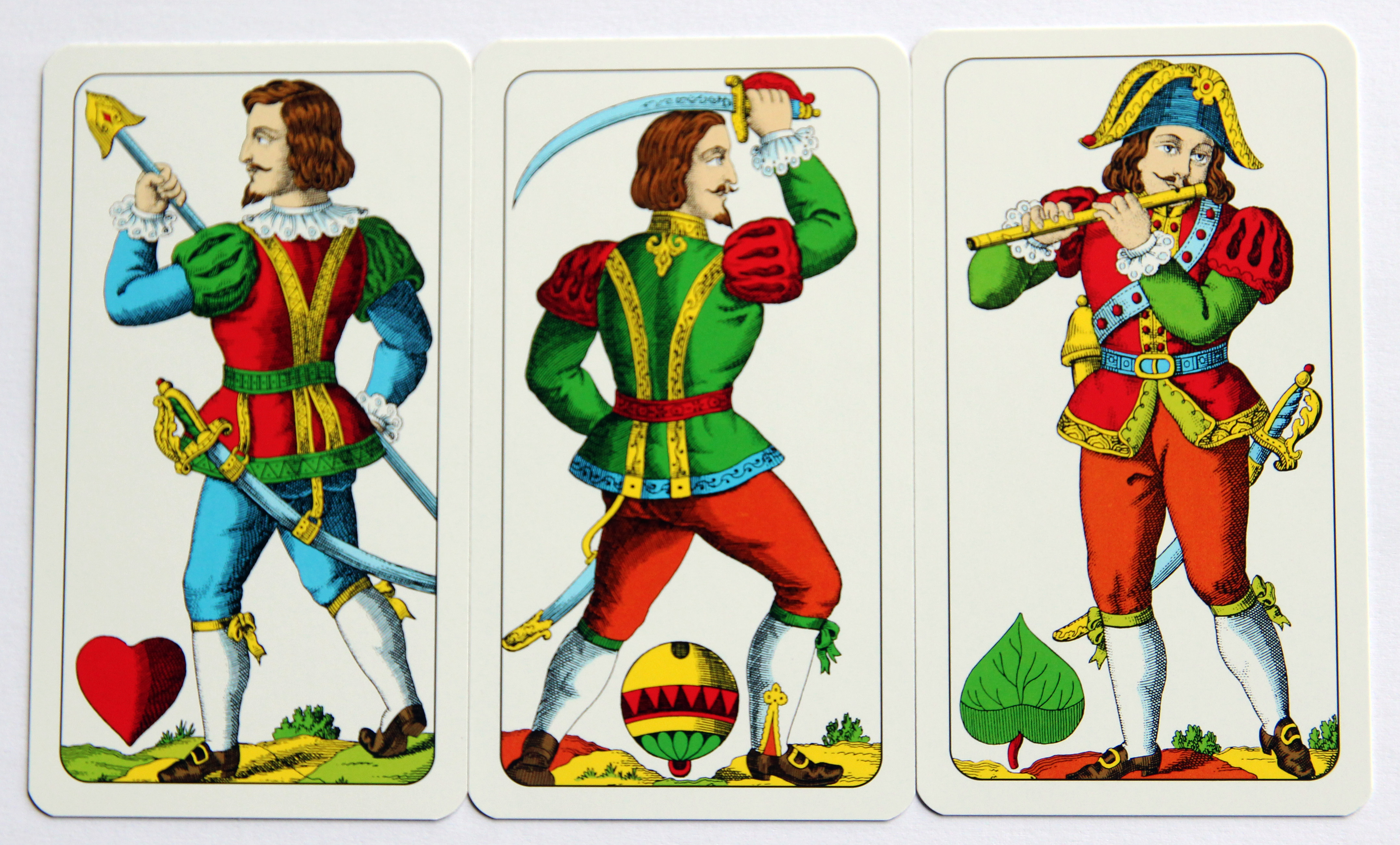
- Three Unters - the unbeatable hand
- Origin: Austria, Bavaria
- Type: Plain-trick
- Family: Rams group
- Players: 3-5
- Cards: 20
- Deck: Salzburg or Double German pack
- Rank (high→low): A 10 K O U
- Play: clockwise

Related games
- Contra, Kratzen, Mauscheln, Mistigri, Tippen, Zwicken
- Features: pot, 3 cards, 'lifting', special card combinations

Lupfen is a card game for 3–5 players that is played mainly in west Austria and south Germany, but also in Liechtenstein. The rules vary slightly from region to region, but the basic game in each variation is identical. It is one of the Rams group of card games characterised by allowing players to drop out of the current game if they think they will be unable to win any tricks or a minimum number of tricks.

== History ==
In many ways, Lupfen resembles the game of Tippen which was already well known in the 19th century. However, the main differences are that Tippen is played with 32 cards and no special combinations, whereas Lupfen is played with just 20 cards, players may 'lift' for trump and certain card combinations come into play. Today, Lupfen is mainly played in the Austrian state of Vorarlberg and in the southern German region of the Allgäu, usually for small monetary stakes. The first international Lupfen competition was held Öflingen in the south German state of Baden-Württemberg in 1974. It is also played by students in Liechtenstein.

== Rules ==
Lupfen is normally played by three to six players with a pack of Salzburg or Bavarian pattern cards with the suits of Acorns (Eichel), Leaves (Schippen), Hearts (Herz) and Bells (Schellen). In Liechtenstein it is played with Swiss-suited cards with the suits: Acorns, Roses, Shields and Bells. Only the Sow (Deuce), 10 or Banner, King, Ober and Unter are used, the cards ranking in that order, making 20 cards in all. The cards are shuffled and each player is dealt 3 cards clockwise, in turn, and one at a time.

Depending on the contents of the pot (Pott), players either play a compulsory 'round' or a Lupfen round.

=== Force ===
The first deal at the beginning of the game is always a compulsory round or 'force' (Pflichtrunde). In addition, a force is played whenever the pot has been exhausted. In a force, all the players must participate; they are not allowed to fold (drop out) if they have a weak hand.

Each player pays a previously agreed ante into the pot - a container placed in the middle of the table. The top card of the remaining stock is turned over and determines the trump suit. The player to the left of the dealer makes the opening lead (kommt heraus). Players must follow suit or, if they have no card in the led suit, must play a trump. If they have no trumps either, they usually plays their lowest card because it is not possible to win a trick without following suit or trumping.

Once the force has been played out, the tricks are reckoned. A player who has taken no tricks has to pay the contents of the pot (paying the money to the pot after the winnings have been distributed). If each player has taken a trick (only possible with 3 players), another force is played. Force deals are repeated until at least one player fails to take any tricks.

=== Lupfen ===
In a Lupfen round, the top card of the stock is not turned for trump immediately after the cards have been dealt. Instead, players decide, in clockwise order, whether to turn the top card, indicating they will "play" or whether to fold i.e. drop out of the current round by saying "pass". If a player has a good hand and believes he can win one or more tricks, he turns the top card of the stock. This is known as a Lupf ("lift", from the south German verb lupfen). The turnup decides the trump suit as normal. The remaining players now decide whether or not to take up the challenge by saying "play!" (mit!", literally "with!"), thereby undertaking to win at least one trick.

The player who has made a Lupf (gelupft), together with the other active players, now play for the pot. Players receive one third of the pot (3 cards → 3 possible tricks) for each trick won. If an active player fails to take a trick, he must pay the contents of the pot. Players continue playing a Lupfen until the pot is empty again.

Example 1: - Player A has made a Lupf - Players B and C decide to play. - Player A takes 1 trick, Player B takes 2 tricks, Player C takes none. → Player A receives 1 third of the pot, Player B receives 2 thirds and Player C has to pay the contents of the pot (the total in the pot thus stays the same)

Example 2: - Player B has made a Lupf and takes all 3 tricks - Players A and C both fail to take any tricks → Player B receives the whole pot, Players A and C each pay (!) the content of the pot (which has now been doubled)

This is repeated until the pot has been completed divided out (i. e. each participant in the deal has taken a trick or a player has made a Lupf, but everyone else has folded). Players may agree beforehand how or when a session ends.

=== Special card combinations ===
A distinguishing feature of Lupfen is its special card combinations:

Three Unters

If a player has three Unters in his hand, he has automatically won once a game is on. In a compulsory round, he declares "three Unters" whereupon all the others must pay the pot. In a Lupfen, he does not reveal his hand, but waits to see which of the others will "play". Once the announcements have been made, the 3 Unters are declared and every other player who opted to "play" has to pay the pot because 3 Unters cannot be beaten.

Scrap

If a player has 2 Unters and 1 Ober - i.e. the weakest possible hand - he may end the deal early by calling "scrap!" (Verworfen). In a compulsory round, the cards are reshuffled and dealt again without anyone having to pay the pot. In a Lupfen, the player may wait until the game is on before scrapping. For example, a player with 2 Unters and an Ober can lupf and wait to see whether anyone plays. If no-one does, he wins the pot. If another player takes up the challenge and wants to play, he reveals his hand and declares "scrap!" and the deal starts again.

Ständer

A Ständer (pronounced "shtender") is when a player has 3 cards of the same suit in his hand (a 3-card flush). This is announced immediately on receipt of the 3rd card by 'knocking' on the table.

== Variations ==
- Dealer stake. It may be agreed before the game that the dealer pays an additional stake to the pot before dealing. Usually the dealing fee = the basic stake. It can, however, be another amount as long as it is divisible by three.
- Shoving. If there is a fee for dealing, the dealer is free to choose whether he goes ahead, shuffles and deals, or 'shoves' (schiebt) the cards to the next player after paying his fee. This can be repeated as often as desired. The pot thus increases each round by the dealing fee i.e. in the playoff round the amount at stake is all the greater. The variant with the fee for the dealer lets the pot grow faster, because it also increases if every player has made a trick in a compulsory round.
- Compulsory Hearts. If trumps are Hearts, all players must play.
- Compulsory Lupf. If a player has 2 Sows, he must lupf.
- Blind Lupf. A player turns the Lupf card before looking at his cards. The loser then pays double the pot.
