= Sticheln =

Card game

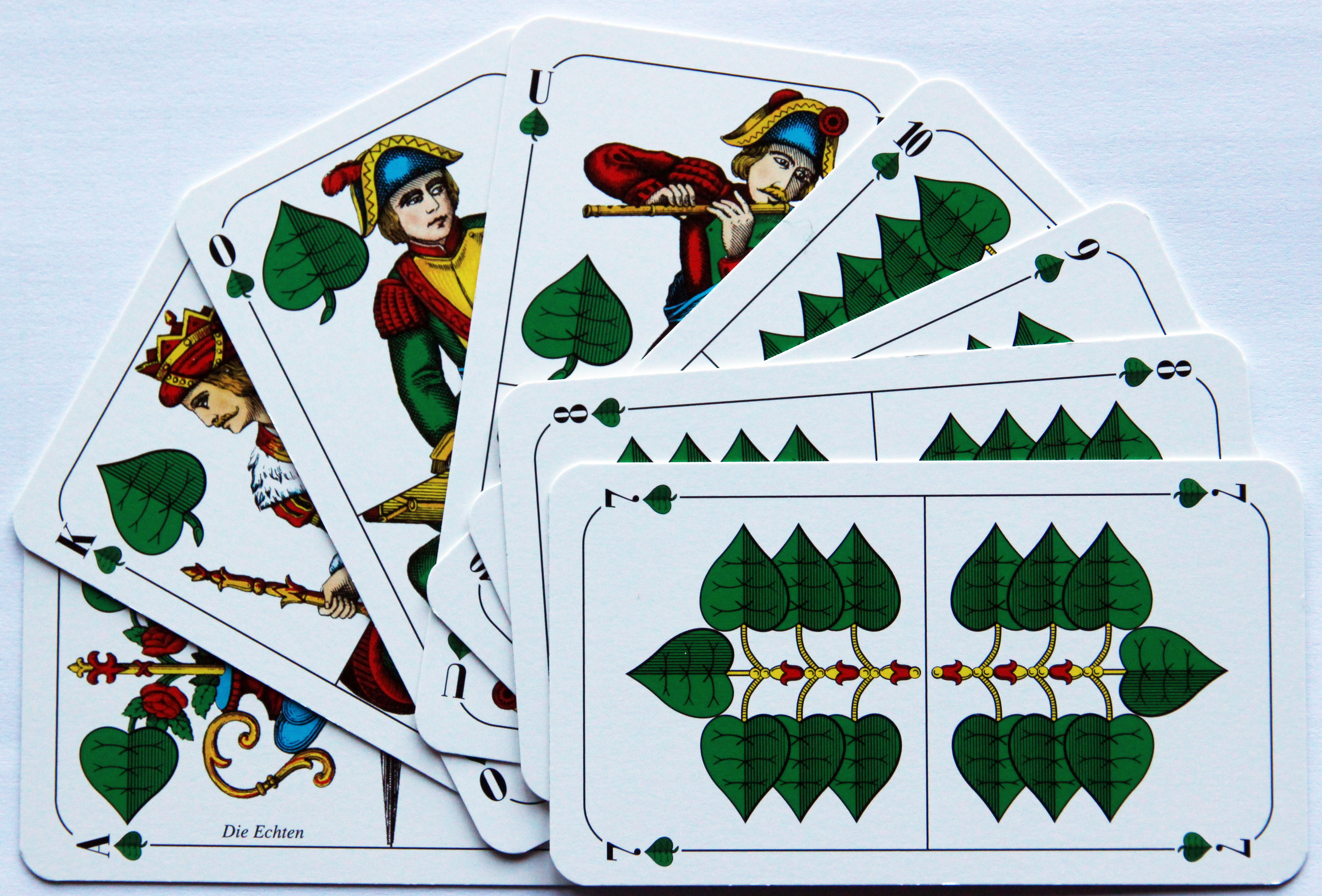
- The suit of Leaves in a German pack
- Origin: Austria
- Type: Plain-trick
- Players: 4
- Cards: 32
- Deck: German
- Rank (high→low): A K O U 10 9 8 7
- Play: Anti-clockwise

Related games
- Whist • Lampeln

Sticheln is an easy-to-learn, trick-taking, card game for 4 players that originated from Austria. It is an old game, being recorded as early as 1756 and its rules being first described in 1830. The name means "playing [for] tricks".

== Description ==
Sticheln has been described as "a very simple card game, which does not need exceptional mental agility to learn quickly - perhaps the reason why it counts so many friends." It is similar to Whist, but played individually rather than in teams, using a shortened pack and a different scoring system. It is a 4-hander and is played either with a French-suited Piquet deck or German playing cards. Cards rank in their natural order: Ace/Sow, King, Queen/Ober, Jack/Unter, Ten, Nine, Eight, Seven.

After cutting the pack to decide on the seating order and dealer will be, the dealer pays eight chips or coins to the pot. He then shuffles the pack and the player to his left cuts it. The bottom card of the top packet is turned as trumps – it belongs to the dealer – then each player is dealt eight cards in two packets of four in anti-clockwise order. Forehand leads to the first trick. Thereafter the trick winner leads to the next one. Players must follow suit, trump if unable, or play any card if they cannot follow or trump. Players must head the trick if possible.

For each trick won, players receive one chip or coin from the pot. Forehand becomes the new dealer and pays his eight chips to the pot.

The game continues either for a pre-agreed number of rounds (each round being 4 deals) or until one player reaches an agreed number of chips.

== Other games called Sticheln ==
The name, Sticheln was also given to an unrelated game which was an historical variant of the gambling game, Zwicken.

In 1993, a new game marketed as Sticheln was launched in Germany. It used proprietary cards and bore no resemblance to the original game of the same name.

== Literature ==
- _ (1756). Die Kunst die Welt erlaubt mitzunehmen in den verschiedenen Arten der Spiele, Volume 2, Georg Bauer, Nuremberg.
- _ (1839). Freut euch des Lebens! Oder: Wollen wir lachen und fröhlich seyn? Vol. 5, Mausberger, Vienna, p. 22.
- Bauer, Georg (1769). Die Kunst die Welt erlaubt mitzunehmen in den verschiedenen Arten der Spiele, Volume 2, Joh. Eberhard Zeh, Nuremberg.
- Tendler, Franz (1830). Verstand und Glück im Bunde. Ein theoretisch-practisches Spielbuch. Sollinger, Vienna.
- Tendler, Franz (1846) Allgemeines Karten-Spielbuch, 2nd edn., Tendler, Vienna, p. 276.
- von Lützenau, Alois Edler (1846). Handbuch der Gesetze und Verordnungen, Vol. 2. Vienna: Carl Ueberreuter.
