= Kratzen =

Austrian card game

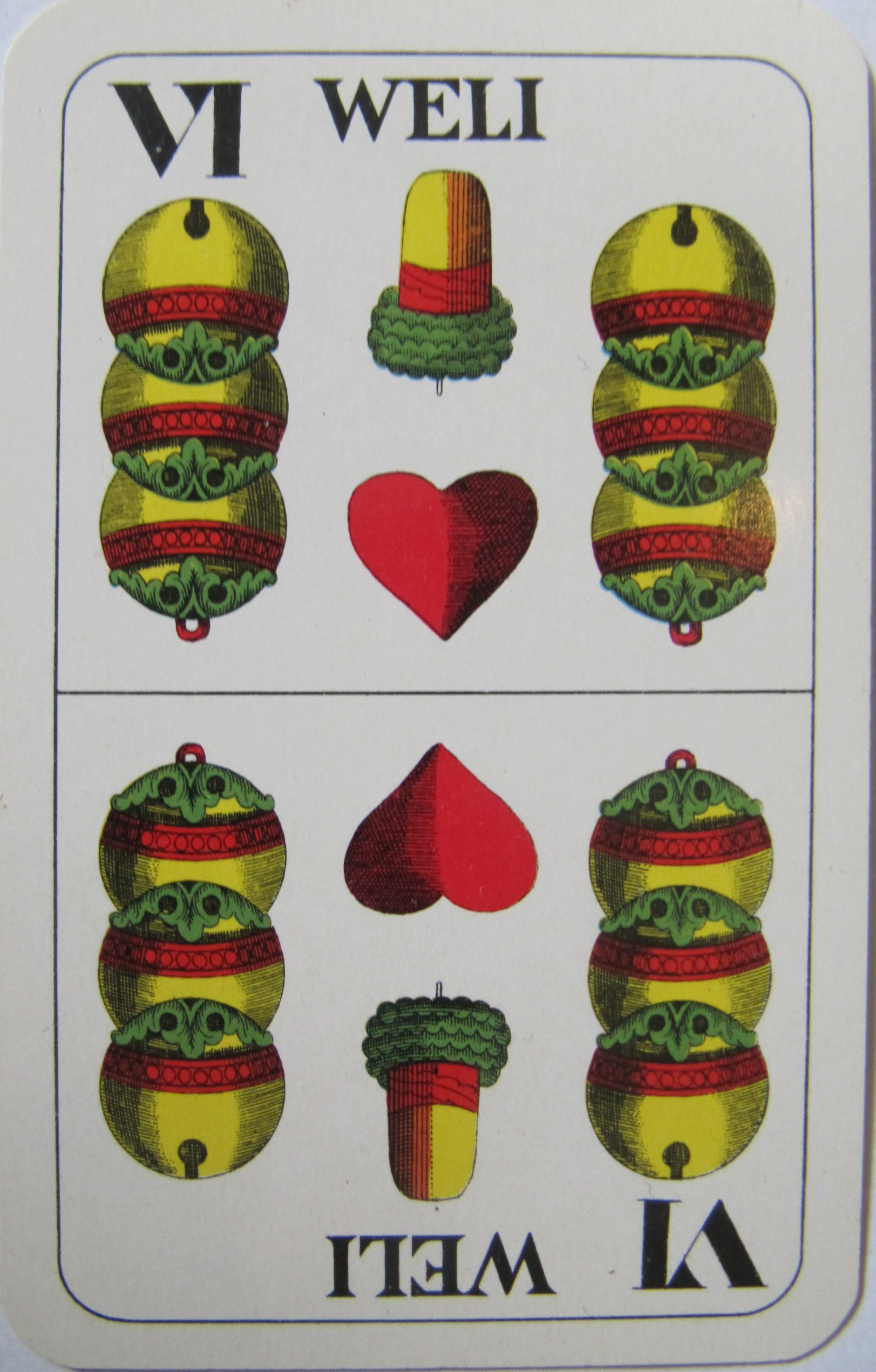
- The Weli is the permanent, 2nd highest trump
- Origin: Austria
- Alternative names: Krotzn
- Type: Plain-trick
- Family: Rams group
- Players: 3-6
- Cards: 32 + Weli
- Deck: William Tell
- Rank (high→low): A K O U 10 9 8 7
- Play: Clockwise

Related games
- Chratze, Contra, Lupfen, Mauscheln, Mistigri, Tippen, Zwicken
- Features: pot, 4 cards, 'hop and jump', exchanging; Weli

Kratzen is an Austrian card game for three to six players that is played for small stakes usually using a 33-card William Tell pack. It is a member of the Rams group of card games characterised by allowing players to drop out of the current game if they think they will be unable to win any tricks or a minimum number of tricks. The game is related to the Swiss Jass form, Chratze and has been described as "fun" to play.

== Cards ==
Kratzen uses a William Tell pack (German-suited) from which all the Sixes have been removed apart from the 6 or Weli, which has a special role as the permanent, 2nd highest trump. The suits are: Acorns (Eichel), Leaves (Laub), Hearts (Herz) and Bells (Schellen).

The ranking of the cards is: Sow (Sau or Ace) > King (König) > Ober > Unter > Ten > Nine > Eight > Seven. In the trump suit, the Weli is just below the Trump Sow.

== Playing ==
The following rules are taken from kartenspiele.net, the source recommended by Geiser.

The game is in two phases. In the first phase, players may not drop out and they contribute an ante to the pot. In the second phase, the aim is to win the contents of the pot, but players may drop out for an individual hand if they think they are unlikely to take the minimum number of tricks.

=== First phase – Muss ===
The first deal is a 'force' or Muss i.e. everyone has to participate; there is no option to 'drop out'. Each player pays an ante into the pot; the dealer pays double. The dealer shuffles and offer the pack to the right to be cut. The cutter cuts and shows the bottom card of the top packet. If it is the Weli, a Sow or a Seven, the cutter looks at the bottom card of the lower packet. Play now proceeds as follows, depending on the cards revealed:

- No Sow, Weli or Seven. Dealer deals as normal (see below).
- Seven. Dealer passes cards to the right. This is a Hupf i.e. 'hop'. The new dealer antes to the pot and reshuffles the pack.
- Single Sow. Hop to left. Forehand pays an ante and reshuffles as the new dealer.
- Two Sows. Dealer passes cards via forehand to the next player (i.e. two places to the left) who becomes the new dealer. This is a Sprung i.e. 'jump'. Both forehand and the new dealer pay an ante and the new dealer reshuffles.
- Sow and Seven. The cards are passed, first in one direction, then the other. Forehand and the next player pay an ante. The role of dealer does not change and the deal proceeds as normal.
- Weli. Dealer deals as normal. Everyone pays an ante.

The above process is repeated each time until a normal card is cut. The dealer then deals a packet of 2 cards, in clockwise order, to each player. The next card is flipped. If it is the Weli, another one is turned. Then another packet of 2 cards is dealt to each player. The upcard determines the trump suit and belongs to the dealer. So the dealer will have at least one, and possibly two, extra cards.

The dealer now becomes the 'striker' (Schläger), effectively the soloist, and must take at least 2 tricks. First, the dealer discards one or two cards to get back to four cards in hand and leads to the first trick. The others have to take at least one trick.

Suit must be followed (Farbzwang), trumps played if that is not possible (Trumpfzwang) and players must head the trick if they are able (Stichzwang). The winner of a trick leads to the next.

After 4 tricks have been played, the score is reckoned. If the striker has not won a minimum of 2 tricks, a penalty of double the pot contents must be paid. A defender who has not won at least 1 trick pays a penalty equivalent to the pot.

=== Second phase - normal game ===
The role of dealer now rotates to the left and the new dealer pays an ante to the pot, shuffles and offers the cards to rearhand to cut. The aforementioned rules for determining the eventual dealer apply and the cards are then dealt. This time the dealer chooses one of the following four contracts:

- Schlagen. The dealer chooses to be the striker and has to win at least 2 tricks.
- Oder. The dealer changes the trump suit by turning cards from the stock until one is of a different suit from the initial trump card. This new card determines the trump suit.
- Weiter-Oder. Only the top card of the talon is turned. Its suit becomes the trump suit and the dealer is the striker.
- Weiter. The dealer passes the right to choose a contract to forehand (the player to the right).

If other players wish to bid, they must outbid any previously announced contracts. The contracts rank in the above order.

Players then decide whether to "play" (mitgehen) or "drop" (Spiel verzichten). In a variant of the rules, a player has the right to announce last; the first one to claim this right has it.

Next, the participating players may exchange any number of hand cards for cards in the talon. The first 3 may be exchanged without revealing them. The fourth and fifth cards to be exchanged must be faced up and, for each trump, the player is dealt another card. if the Trump Ace is dealt face up, the player is given 5 extra cards, face down. They can they rearrange their hand and discard excess cards to bring their hand down to four again.

A special feature is the Seven Muss (Siebenermuss). If the trump suit has been determined by a Seven, the deal becomes a force (Muss) and is played as in the first phase. Each player only needs one trick to win, regardless of whether they were the striker or not.

With the exception of the Seven Muss, the game continues as follows. The striker must win at least two tricks, the other active players at least one. For each trick won, players earn 1/4 of the pot. The indivisible remainder can either remain in the pot or be assigned to the striker Any player who fails to achieve the target pays an amount equivalent to that already in the pot, or double if that player is the striker. If no player has to pay a penalty, the pot is either empty again or contains an indivisible remainder. Then the next round is another Muss. Otherwise another normal game is played.

== Literature ==
- Geiser, Remigius (2004). "100 Kartenspiele des Landes Salzburg" (PDF). Talon (13). Archived from the original (PDF) on 27 August 2018.
- Muhr, Gisela (2014). Spritz! Z'rück! Un' druff!. Rheinbach: Regionalia. ISBN 978-3-95540-123-8
