= Tippen =

German card game

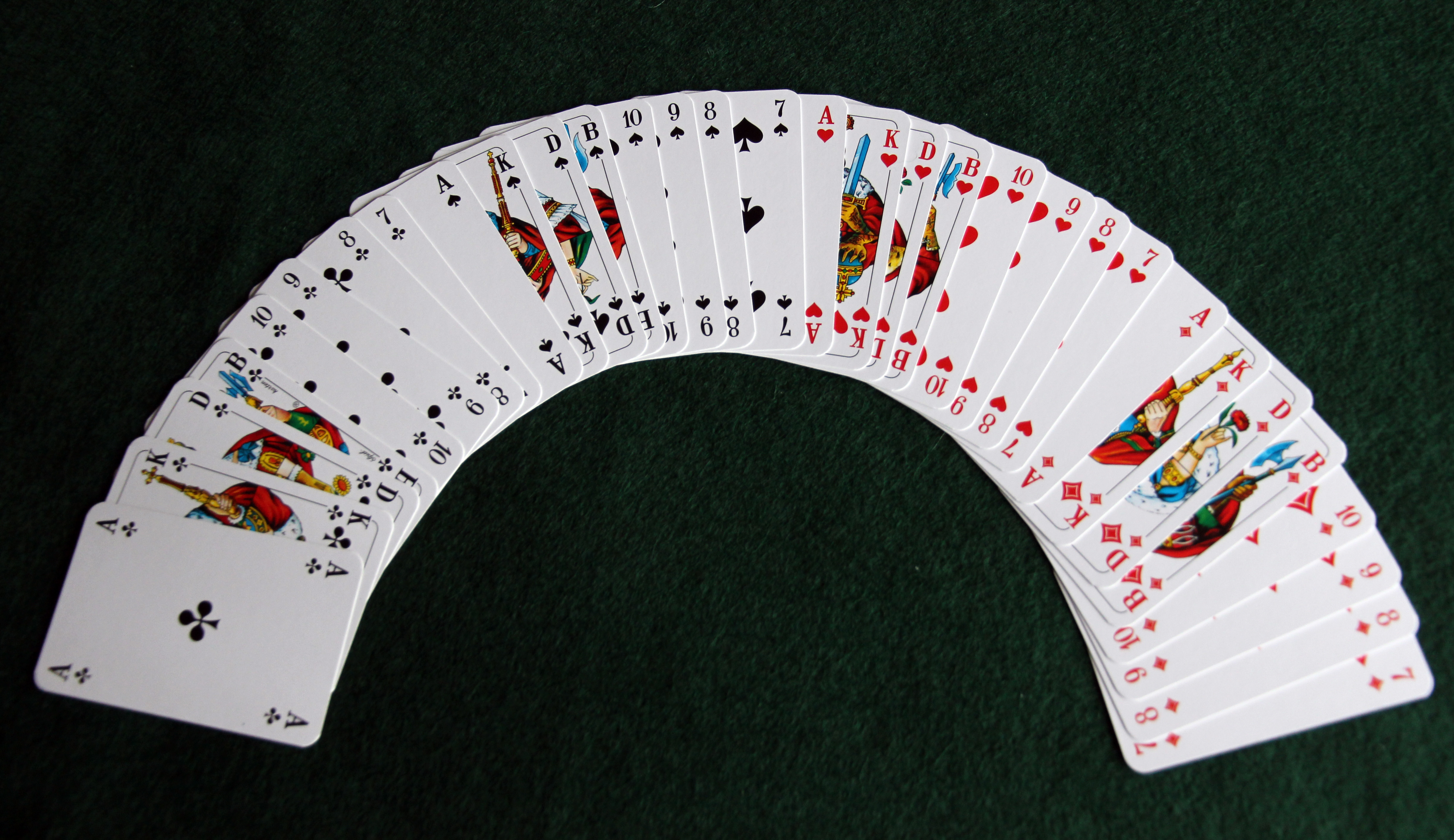
- French-suited 32-card pack
- Origin: Germany
- Type: Plain-trick game
- Family: Rams group
- Players: 3-5
- Cards: 32
- Deck: Piquet pack
- Rank (high→low): A K Q J 10 9 8 7
- Play: Clockwise

Related games
- Contra • Kratzen • Lupfen • Mauscheln • Mistigri • Zwicken
- Features: pot, 3 cards, no 'hop & jump'

Tippen, also known as Dreiblatt, Dreikart, Drei Karten, Dreekort, Kleinpréférence or Labet, is an historical German 3-card, plain-trick game which was popular as a gambling game for three or more players. The Danish version of the game was known as Trekort and more elaborate Swedish variants include Knack and Köpknack. It appears to be related to the English game of Three-Card Loo. It was banned as a gambling game in some places.

== History and etymology ==
The game was described in 19th century anthologies and encyclopedias but appears related to 3-card Loo, which was already described in the 18th century. In some locations the game was illegal.

Dreiblatt is recorded as early as 1807 as a gambling game in which players received three cards, and Tippen is mentioned in 1790 as a gambling game similar to Grobhäusern and Trischak. In 1810 it is briefly described as follows: "Tippen... each of the participants in the game is dealt 3 cards, after which trump is then turned, with which he must be able to take at least one trick if he enters the game in order to win a part of the stakes; [the game is named] from the fact that a player who wants to play in the game indicates this by tapping his finger on the table." In 1816, Tippen is included in a list of German card games, but the earliest description of the rules appears in 1821 in Das neue Königliche l'Hombre as Drei Karten ("Three Cards") along with a variant called Loup or Wolf (loup being French word "wolf"), described below. Several early 19th century sources affirm that Dreiblatt and Tippen were the same game.

By 1836 it had reached Mecklenburg where it was played by the lower classes exclusively with French-suited cards alongside Schafskopf, Fünfkart and Solo, the dignitaries playing Whist, Boston, Ombre, Faro and, less often, Solo as well.

Tippen is German for tapping and refers to the practice of players tapping on the table to indicate that they intend to "play" and not "pass" i.e. drop out of the current game. Dreiblatt or Drei Karten refers to the 3 cards each player is dealt. It appears related to the Danish game of Trekort whose rules appear as early as 1774 and again in an Jørgensen's 1829 Danish game anthology.

== Cards ==
Tippen is played with a 32-card Piquet pack. The suits are illustrated in the table below. Card ranking is: Ace > King > Queen > Jack > Ten > Nine > Eight > Seven.

Playing card suits
French deck				
Name of the suits	Hearts (Herz)	Diamonds (Karo)	Spades (Pik)	Clubs (Kreuz, Treff)

== Rules ==
The following rule sets indicate the development of the game from the early 19th century to the present. Note that, although most sources cite three to five players, Pierer suggests the game is also playable by two or up to ten players. Von Alvensleben says that more than five players require a 'whist pack'.

=== Drei Karten (1821) ===
The earliest known rules appeared in 1821 under the name Drei Karten ("three cards") and describe the game as follows:

"Drei Karten. This is played between 3 to 6 people. The dealer antes 3 counters (Marken), deals each person one card, three times in succession, the ninth, which belongs to him, determines trumps. Everyone must play the first hand. Anyone who fails to take a trick pays, the first time, 3 counters, and doubles the pool. When there is a bête [pool with more than 3 counters], anyone may pass. In this game you can lose with 2 trumps, and make 2 tricks without a single trump." Each trick taken earned 1 counter.

A variant called Loup or Wolf is also mentioned. (Note: "Loup" is French for "wolf".) "This is the same game, except that each player is dealt 6 cards, and so at most only five may play, because otherwise there would not be enough cards. The dealer antes 6 counters, not 3, so that when there is no bête, each trick earns 1 counter." (Note: It is evident that players must have earned 1 counter per trick in Drei Karten as well.) In Ludwigslust Castle is a surviving example of a so-called "Loup Table" (Loupe-Tisch), a card table with seating for six players and six money pockets at each place.

=== Dreiblatt or Tippen (1859) ===
In 1859, von Alvensleben gives a more detailed account of the game under the names of Dreiblatt, Dreikarten or Tippen. He also notes that it was sometimes played with four cards and known as Vierblatt to evade anti-gambling laws.

==== Preliminaries ====
The game is played by 3 to 6 players using a Piquet pack of 32 cards, or by more players using a Whist pack of 52 cards. Players choose any seat and the first dealer is the one who is dealt an Ace. The dealer antes a basic game stake (Kartenstamm) of 3 counters (Marken) and deals each player 3 cards individually. The next is turned as trumps.

==== Bidding ====
When there is only a basic stake in the pool, everyone must play until there is a bête. For each trick won, a token is paid from the pot (Pot). Anyone who fails to make a trick, antes a bête equal to the basic stake. When there is a bête in the pot, players may choose to play or pass; a player who passes throws his cards, face down, on the table; one who plays, undertakes to make at least one trick and does this by saying "I'm playing" (ich spiele) or tapping (tippen) his finger on the table. Each player that takes a trick receives one third of the bête and anyone who fails to take a trick must double the pot. All new bêtes are added to any existing ones.

==== Play ====
Players must follow suit if possible, otherwise may trump if able. If the trick has already been trumped, they may overtrump or discard as they please. If there are at least three active players, the first must lead a trump. A player who took the first trick and has the trump Deuce, must lead it to the second trick.

To limit the size of the pot, players usually agree a maximum bête. Everything above that is set aside for the next or subsequent deals along with the basic stake anted by the dealer.

==== Variations ====
Von Alvensleben records the following variations:

- Robbing (rauben) must be agreed beforehand. A player who holds the 7 of trumps may rob the trump upcard before play begins.
- Sniffing (riechen) is when the dealer has the right to swap the trump upcard for a hand card that is then discarded face down. The dealer must announce this by saying "I'm sniffing" (ich rieche!), before turning the trump. The dealer must either play or exercise the option to drop out and pay a simple bête i.e. a single stake. If the dealer plays and takes no tricks, the dealer pays a double bête.
- Hop and jump (Hupf und Sprung) is the feature that when the pack is cut, the lowest card is viewed and the deal passes to the next player if it is an Ace or Seven. This is done to increase the contents of the pot because the new dealer must also ante the basic stake. With this variation, players are not forced to play when there is only a basic stake in the pot.

=== Tippen (1905) ===
Tippen is described in the 1905 edition of Meyers Lexikon as follows:

Tippen (Dreiblatt, Zwicken), a gambling game of cards that is very widely played in Germany. It is played by 3–6 people with 32 cards or, with more participants, with 52 cards. The dealer pays three counters (Marken) as the initial stake (Stamm), deals each player 3 cards, one at a time, and turns the next for trump. If only the Stamm is available, all the players must play (mitgehen), and anyone who fails to take a trick pays a bête (the amount in the pot). Once the pot includes a bête, any player not confident of taking a trick may pass ("passen"); a player, however, with good cards, may say: "I'll go with you" ("Ich gehe mit") or taps (tippt) his finger on the table. For each trick taken, a player receives one third of the existing pool. Players must follow suit or trump.

— Tippen at www.zeno.org.

=== Tippen (late 20th century) ===
The following modern rules are based on Grupp (1975) and Katira (1983) which are identical apart from the method of dealing and the penalty for taking no tricks.

==== Preliminaries ====
Three to five players play with a 32-card Piquet pack. The cards rank in the natural order (aces highs) - see above. Deal and play are clockwise. Dealer pays 3 counters into the pot (Pott, Topf or Kasse), shuffles, offers the cut to the player on the right, deals 3 cards, one at a time, to each player, and turns the next card for trump (Grupp). Alternatively, 2 cards may be dealt, one at a time, to each player and the next turned for trumps before one more card each is dealt (Katira).

==== Bidding and exchanging ====
Players now examine their hands, assess whether they can take at least one trick and bid to "play" or "pass". If they pass, they lay their cards face down on the table. If they want to play, they tippen i.e. tap their fingers on the table. If all pass, the next dealer also pays a stake, shuffles, offers the cut and redeals. If only one player tipps, that player wins the pot, the dealer rotates and a new deal begins.

Each active player, beginning with forehand, may now exchange up to 3 cards, laying their discard(s) face down; the dealer then gives them the same number of cards from the talon.

==== Play ====
Forehand, or the next active player sitting after the dealer in clockwise order, leads to the first trick. Players must follow suit; trump if unable and head the trick if possible. If unable to do any of those, they may discard any card.

The aim is to win at least 2 of the 3 tricks. Each won trick is worth a third of the pot. Any active player who fails to win a single trick must pay a bête equivalent to the contents of the pot (Katira) or the basic stake of 3 counters (Grupp). (Note: Paying a bête by doubling the pot appears more of a gambler's rule, whereas limiting the bête to 3 counters is more suited to social and family games.)

==== Variations ====
Grupp and Katira mention the following as variations:

- Force called Tipp-Zwang is played when there is only the basic stake in the pot.
- Shoving (schieben). The dealer pays the ante but may 'shove' the cards to his left for the next player to add another ante and then deal. That player may also shove.
- Knocking. The dealer has the right to 'knock' on the - as yet unfaced - trump card before looking at his or her own hand. In exercising this right, the dealer picks the trump up without revealing it, announces the trump suit, picks up the hand cards and discards a card. A dealer who knocks and fails to take a trick pays a double stake. A dealer who takes just one trick having knocked, pays a single stake.
- Sniffing (riechen). All is as in von Alvensleben's account, except that the dealer may knock the pack instead of saying "I'm sniffing" and add the trump, unseen, to his or her hand cards announcing its suit, before making a discard, face down. The dealer may not drop out, but must take at least 2 tricks. The dealer pays a single bête if only 1 trick is taken and a double bête if none are taken.

== Variants ==
=== Vierblatt or Mauscheln ===
Where the game was illegal under its name Dreiblatt, players sometimes played a variant with a hand of 4 cards. This was a game in its own right known variously as Vierblatt, Angehen or (especially in south Germany and Austria) Mauscheln. Today, Mauscheln is common in Austria and south Germany, unlike Tippen which is not played in Austria, but still played in Germany.

=== Loup or Wolf ===
See above.

== See also ==
- Vierblatt
- Zwicken

== Literature ==
- Das neue Königliche l'Hombre nebst einer gründlichen Anweisung (16th revised ed.). Lüneburg: Herold & Wahlstab. 1821.
- von Alvensleben, Ludwig (1853), Encyklopädie der Spiele (in German), Leipzig: Otto Wigand, pp. 201f.
- Campe, Joachim Heinrich (1807). Wörterbuch der Deutschen Sprache. Volume 1. Brunswick.
- Campe, Joachim Heinrich (1810). Wörterbuch der Deutschen Sprache. Volume 4 (S and T). Brunswick: Schulbuchhandlung.
- Geiser, Remigius (2004). "100 Kartenspiele des Landes Salzburg" (PDF). Talon (13). Archived from the original (PDF) on 27 August 2018.
- Grupp, Claus D. (1975). Kartenspiele. Wiesbaden: Falken-Verlag Erich Sicker. ISBN 3-8068-2001-5.
- Heinsius, Theodor (1818). Volksthümliches Wörterbuch der deutschen Sprache, Volume 1 (A–E). Hanover: Hahn.
- Hoffmann, Karl Friedrich Vollrath (1836). Deutschland und seine Bewohner, Vol. 4. Stuttgart: J. Scherble.
- Jørgensen, S. A. (1829), Nyeste Dansk Spillebog (in Danish), Copenhagen: Schubothe.
- Katira, Kay Uwe (1983). Verbotene Kartenspiele. Munich.: Wilhelm Heyne. ISBN 3-453-41550-7.
- Meyer, Joseph (1909). "Tippen". Meyers Großes Konversations-Lexikon, Volume 19. Leipzig, p. 564.
- Parlett, David (1990), The Oxford guide to card games: a historical survey, Oxford University Press, ISBN 978-0-19-214165-1
- Pierer, H. A. (1863). "Tippen". Pierer's Universal-Lexikon. Vol. 17. Altenburg.
- Schütze, Dr. St. (1814). Taschenbuch der Liebe und Freundschaft gewidmet. Frankfurt: Fr. Wilmann.
- von Düben, Dr. C.G.F (1816). Talisman des Glücks, oder Der Selbstlehrer für alle Karten-, Schach-, Billard-, Ball- und Kegel-Spiele. Berlin: Societäts-Buchhandlung.
- von Liechtenstern, Joseph Freiherrn (1825). Allgemeines deutsches Sach-Wörterbuch aller menschlichen Kenntnisse und Fertigkeiten, Volume 2. Meissen: F.W. Goedsche.
