= Cucumber (card game) =

Card game

- Origin: Sweden
- Alternative names: Agurk, Gurka, Gúrka, Kurkku, Mätäpesä, Ogórek
- Players: 2-7
- Age range: 7+
- Cards: 52
- Deck: French-suited pack
- Rank (high→low): A K Q J 10 – 2
- Chance: fairly high

Cucumber (Danish: Agurk, Swedish: Gurka) is a north European card game of Swedish origin for two or more players. The goal of the game is to avoid taking the last trick. David Parlett describes it as a "delightful Baltic gambling game".

== History and distribution ==
According to John McLeod, the game may have originated in the 1940s as a way of playing Krypkille with a standard 52-card pack as opposed to the traditional Swedish Kille cards. Today the game is played in different national variants under different names: as Agurk in Denmark, Gurka in Norway and Sweden, Ogórek in Poland, Kurkku and Mätäpesä in Finland, and Gúrka in Iceland.

== Cards ==
Cucumber is played with a regular pack of French-suited playing cards without the Jokers. The Ace is the highest, the Deuce, the lowest card. Suits are irrelevant.

== Rules ==
The basic Danish rules are as follows:

Deal and play are clockwise. Each player receives seven cards and any remaining cards are set aside. Forehand leads to the first trick and everyone has to head the trick if able, which they can do by playing a card of a higher or equal rank. A player who cannot head the trick, plays the lowest card held. The player who played the highest card makes the trick and leads to the next.

In the last trick, the player who takes it by playing the highest card, scores penalty points to the value of that card, numerals scoring their face value, and the courts as follows: Jack 11, Queen 12, King, 13 and Ace 14. If two or more players play the highest card to the last trick, they each score the penalty points due.

Aces have a special role. If an Ace is led, the lowest card must be played, even if by players who hold an Aces themselves.

Once a player accumulates a total of 30 points or more, that player is out of the game. The winner is the last player left in.

A cucumber may be drawn to indicate that a player has dropped out.

=== Hard score ===
According to Parlett, if the game is played for hard score, each player antes a stake to the pot. A player who is 'cucumbered' (i.e. reaches, not exceeds, 30 and drops out), may buy himself back in by paying a stake, but starts with a score equal to that of the player with the highest number of penalty points. A player can only do this once and may only do so if there are at least 3 other players still in. The last player in sweeps the pot.

== Variations ==
The following variations may be played:

- Heading the trick: players may either head the trick or play their lowest card, except when an Ace is played, when the lowest must always be played.
- Cards: the dealer chooses how many cards are dealt to each player, but they must receive the same and at least 3 cards each.
- Points: the first player to reach 21 points is 'cucumber' and loses the game.
- Aces: the Ace has no special role. If an Ace is led, it can be beaten by another Ace, except in the last trick.

== Five Cucumbers ==
In 2013, Friedemann Friese released a proprietary game, Five Cucumbers (Fünf Gurken), based on the same concept. However, there are 60 bespoke cards in the game, the loser of each deal gets one or more cucumber counters, and the game is lost if a player gets more than five.

== Multiplayer iOS App ==
As of 2025, Gurka is available for free on the iOS App Store.

== Bibliography ==
- Parlett, David (2008). The Penguin Book of Card Games. London: Penguin. ISBN 978-0-141-03787-5.
