= Kontraspiel =

German trick-taking card game

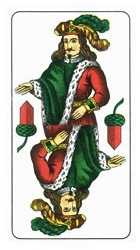
- The Unter of Acorns - the top trump
- Type: Plain-trick
- Players: 4
- Cards: 24-card
- Rank (high→low): A K O (U) 10 9

Related games
- Kratzen, Lupfen, Mauscheln, Mistigri, Tippen, Zwicken
- Features: pot, 5 cards, 2 Wenzels as top trumps

Kontraspiel, also called Contra, is a German 5-card plain-trick game for four individual players using 24 cards. Eldest hand has the first right to accept or make trumps. The Unters of Acorns and Leaves (the equivalent of the two black Jacks) are permanent highest trumps, the Wenzels. Kontraspiel is similar to the Scandinavian game Polskpas and is recorded as early as 1811.

== History ==
Kontra, or as it was spelled in the 17th century, Contra, is clearly derived from the French game la bête, which was characterised by the possibility for some players to call for contre (French for double, attested as early as 1611) against a 'declarer'. Labetenspiel was very popular in the German-speaking countries from the early 17th century. As contra the game is recorded from 1697.

An early mention of Contra appears in 'Amaranthes' (), Nutzbares, galantes und curiöses Frauenzimmer Lexicon of 1715, where it is described as one of the games played with "German cards" i.e. a 32-card German-suited pack, then in a list of games in a 1755 poem. In 1786, it was reported that, along with Trischaken, it was a very popular game among the peasants in German-speaking lands.

The earliest rules appeared in 1773 in Johann Joseph Schmidlin's Catholicon ou Dictionnaire universel de la langue françoise / Catholicon oder französisch-deutsches Universal-Wörterbuch, Vol. C, under the entry 'Contra. (…) [Spiel]', but the first comprehensive account is given in Hammer's 1811 edition of Die deutschen Kartenspiele. and then re-surfaces from 1853 to 1879 in various German games compendia. It may be an elaboration of Polskpas. Having the two black jacks is reminiscent of Euchre.

Kontraspiel was gradually displaced by Skat, which combined elements of Kontraspiel and Tarok and became the dominant German national card game. Today Kontraspiel is of primarily historical interest, though it continues to be studied as a direct forerunner of Skat.

== Card ranking ==
Tens are low. The two Wenzels are the highest members of the trump suit, with the U ranking higher than the U. A Wenzel is not part of its natural suit unless this happens to be the trump suit. If the trump suit is either Hearts or Bells there are 8 trumps. Otherwise there are only seven trumps.

== Basic concept ==
There are four players. Each one receives 5 cards in batches of 2–3 or 3–2. The remaining 4 cards are not used in the game, except for the first of them, which is turned face-up to determine the preferred trump suit. The actual trump suit is decided in a negotiation phase described in the next section.

The standard rules of trick-play as in Whist apply. Eldest hand leads to the first trick. Suit must be followed. The player who played the highest trump, or the highest card of the suit led, wins the trick and leads to the next. To win the game one must win 3 tricks. To make sure that there is always a winner, it is also enough to be the first player to win 2 tricks, so long as the other tricks do not all fall to the same player. A player who does not win a single trick is said to be revolted. A player who wins all 5 tricks is said to make the match.

== Soloist, contra and recontra ==
Starting with eldest hand, each player gets the chance to become soloist with the preferred suit as trumps. If everybody passes, there is a second round in which each player gets the chance to become soloist with a different suit. In the second round, eldest hand is the only player who is allowed to do this with the preferred suit. If the second round fails as well, the game is not played and the next dealer deals.

In the event that the turn-up card is a Wenzel, the dealer automatically becomes soloist with the card's natural suit as trumps. In this case the dealer takes up the card and discards another card face-down to get their hand down to 5 cards.

If the turn-up card is an Ace and the dealer has not yet looked at their hand, then he or she can choose whether to follow the procedure just described for Wenzels. However, if the player has once chosen to take up the game in this situation, automatically does so. This tacit agreement is ended in case it causes the dealer to be revolted.

Under certain conditions another player may announce match, replace the original soloist, and determine a new trump suit:

- There is already a soloist.
- The soloist did not become soloist by taking up a Wenzel or Ace turn-up card before looking at their cards.
- No card has been played yet.

A player who announces match must choose a trump suit other than the preferred suit.

At any time before the second trick has been started, any player other than the soloist may announce contra. If all of the following conditions are satisfied, the contrarian is allowed to replace one of their hand cards by the turn-up card:

- The first trick has not been started yet.
- The turn-up card has not been taken up yet.
- The soloist has taken the game during the first round.

In particular, if the dealer initially passed and then chose to take the game in the second round in the preferred suit, then the turn-up card even is in the trump suit but the contrarian may not take it. This is an incentive for the dealer to pass in the first round.

If contra has been announced, then at any time before the third trick has been started, a third player may announce recontra. This can occur in practice when such a third player has been surprised by winning the first two tricks and is sure that no other player will win two tricks.

== Scoring ==
The game is played for money and uses a pot for the stakes. The dealer pays one unit into the pot before the game starts. The base value of any game is as much as the pot contained before the game, but at least one unit and at most four units.

Every soloist, contra player or recontra player receives or pays the base value from or to the pot, depending on whether the player won or lost. In the event that a player wins unexpectedly, without being the soloist, contra player or recontra player, the player receives nothing but the soloist and any contra or recontra player must still pay.

Additional side-payments are made in case a soloist matches or a soloist, contra player or recontra player is revolted.

- A soloist who makes the match receives one unit from every opponent.
- A soloist, contra or recontra player who is revolted pays one unit to every opponent.

In either case the amount is doubled if the preferred trump suit was played. In the first case the amount is also doubled if the match was announced.

Moreover, a player who announced match but did not make it pays two units to every opponent. Such a player may still have won or lost the game in the normal way. The player is only treated differently from a normal soloist for the purposes of the side-payments.

== Variations ==
- The Wenzels are treated in the same way as aces when turned up, i.e. the dealer can (consistently) choose whether to take up such games or not.

== Literature ==
- _ (1880). Buch der Spiele und Rätsel, pp. 56ff.
- _ (1896). "Das Kontraspiel" in Das Volkswohl, Year 2. Passau: Koenig, p. 18.
- Anton, Friedrich (1879). Encyclopädie der Spiele. Leipzig: Wigand.
- Hammer, Paul (1811). Die deutschen Kartenspiele. Leipzig: Weygand.
- von Alvensleben, Ludwig (1853), Encyklopädie der Spiele (in German), Leipzig: Otto Wigand, pp. 299f
- Parlett, David (1990), The Oxford guide to card games: a historical survey, Oxford University Press, p. 185, ISBN 978-0-19-214165-1
- _ (1773). Nutzbares, galantes und curiöses Frauenzimmer-Lexicon. Leipzig: Gleditsch.
