= Blind hookey =

Card game

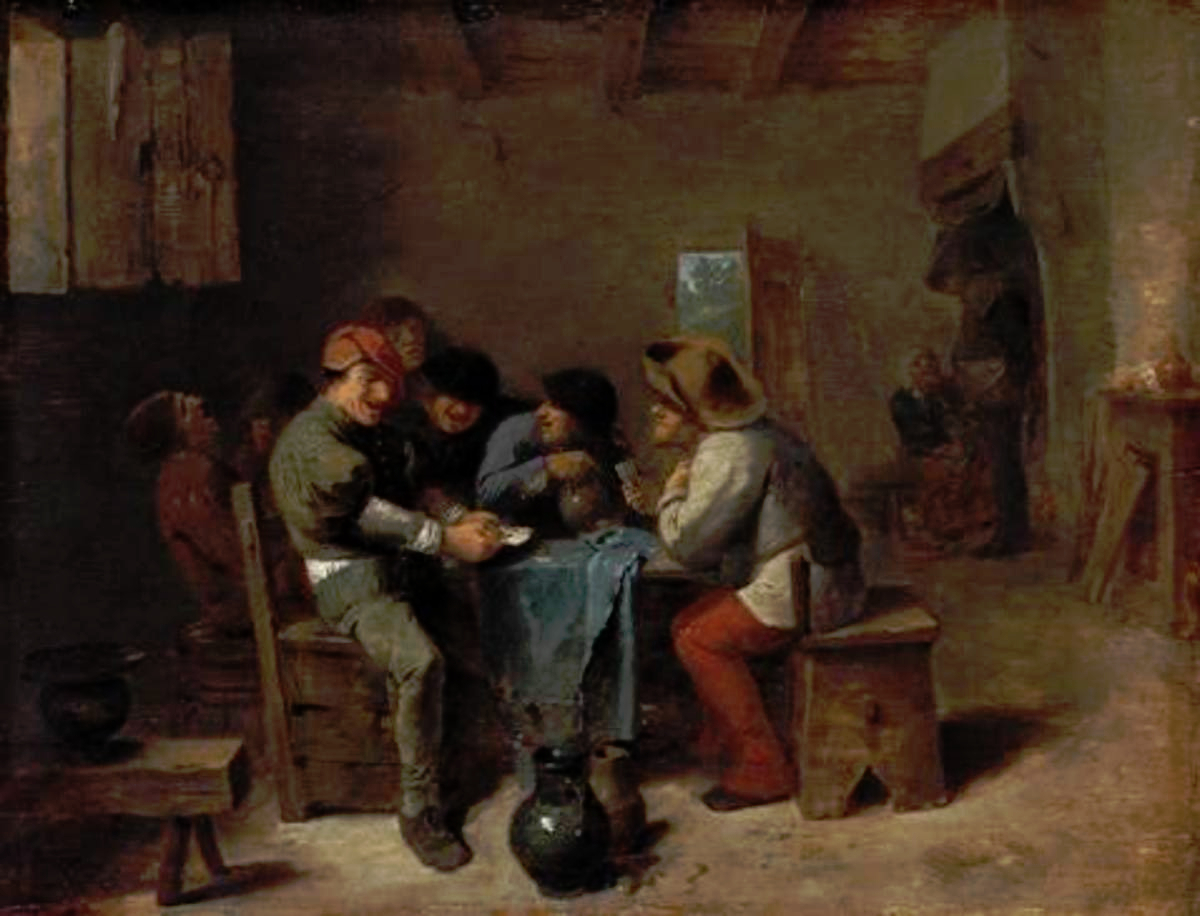
Adriaen Brouwer: Card playing peasants in a tavern with Kiebitzers looking on (c. 1630 painting)

Blind hookey, also known as Dutch bank, banker and broker and honest John, is a simple game of chance using playing cards. The game is popular in Germany where it is known as Häufeln, Bockspiel or Päckchen wenden, after the little packets of cards used.

== History ==
Häufeln is recorded as early as 1773 as a card game in which there are as many piles (Häufeln) as players. The name Blind Hookey appears in 1824 in Gallignani's Messenger. In 1835, Häufeln, is described as "a pernicious game of chance, similar to Pharo." But it was also played as a family game for, e.g., nuts.

== Rules ==
Either a 52-card, French-suited pack is used or a 32-card French- or German-suited pack. The banker shuffles, offers the cards for cutting, places any number of piles of cards face down on the table and keeps one for himself, selected by the punters. The punters then bet on the rest.

The bottom cards in the piles decide who wins and loses: If the lowest card in a pile is higher than the banker's card, the punter wins 1:1; if the bottom card is equal or lower in rank, the banker wins.

== House advantage ==
Winning and losing are decided by two cards:

- If the banker and punter have different cards, they are likely to win ½, and so neither party has an advantage.
- However, if the two cards are equal in rank, the banker wins: the probability that a pair will occur when two cards are drawn from a pack of 52 is just 3 : 51 or 1/17 = 5.9%. If you play with a pack of 32 German-suited or Piquet cards, the probability is 3 : 31 = 9.7%.

Thus the house advantage is:

- 5.9 % if a pack of 52 French-suited cards is used
- 9.7 % if a pack of 32 cards is used

If, in the case of cards of equal rank, the banker collects only half the stakes, the house advantage reduces to 1/34 = 2.9% when using a pack of 52 cards, or to 3/62 = 4.8% when using a pack of 32 cards.

== Literature ==
- Adelung, Johann Christoph (1773). Versuch eines Vollständigen Grammatisch-Kritischen Wörterbuches der Hochdeutschen Mundart. Part 2 (F–K). Leipzig: Breitkopf.
- Galignani's Messenger: The Spirit of the English Journals. Vol. 1. Paris: Gallignani. 1824.
- _ (1908). Meyers Konversationslexikon.
- Bernoulli, Jakob (1899). Ostwalds Klassiker der exakten Wissenschaften. W. Engelmann.
- Gibson, Walter (1993) [1974]. Hoyle's Modern Encyclopedia of Games (Reprint ed.). Devizes, Wiltshire: Selecta Book Ltd. ISBN 9781856481144.
- Katira, Kay Uwe (1983). Verbotene Kartenspiele. Munich.: Wilhelm Heyne. ISBN 3-453-41550-7.
- Muller, D.C. (1835). Gedichte: Aufsätze und Lieder im Geiste Marc Sturms. Regensburg.
- von Jan, Hermann Ludwig (1887). Erzählungen aus dem Wasgau. Leipzig: Grunow.
