= Ramsch =

German card game

Ramsch, formerly also called Mike in East Germany, is a card game based on the contract of the same name in the popular German card games, Skat and Schafkopf. However, thanks to its interesting mode of play it has since developed into an independent game in its own right which is only loosely based on Skat or Schafkopf. It should not be confused with the games of the Rams family – Ramsen and Ramscheln – that also go by the name Ramsch.

== Name ==
The term Ramsch in German means something like "low-quality rejects", "cheap products", "mass-produced goods", "worthless junk" or simply "rubbish". The aim in Ramsch, unlike normal contracts, is not to score the most card points (Augen), but to achieve a low score, because the player who scores the most points at the end of the hand has lost.

== Schafkopf ==
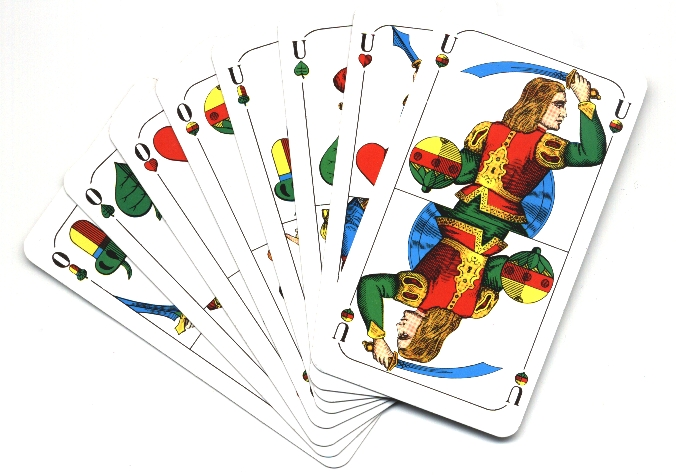
Schafkopf cards

Ramsch is not part of the official rules of Schafkopf and, as a result, there are variations. Usually Ramsch is played if all four players "pass" instead of declaring a game, because they think they have poor hands. Alternatively, if the first three pass, the fourth player may choose a Ramsch (as opposed to a Stock in which players ante a stake to the next round and the cards are thrown in).

In a standard Ramsch the Obers, Unters and Hearts form the trump suit and all other cards are ranked in the normal ace–ten order (A, 10, K, 9,...). Players play for themselves and aim to score as few points as possible and, ideally, take no tricks. Some circles play a Bauernramsch in which only the Obers and Unters are trumps; the rest of the Hearts form a plain suit along with Acorns, Leaves and Bells. The rules of play in Ramsch are the same as normal: players must follow suit if they can; otherwise may play any card. The player with the most points has lost and pays the other three an agreed stake. If two or more have the same number of points, the number of tricks is the decider; if they are also equal the player with the most trumps is the loser, and, if they are also equal, the player with the highest trump has lost. If a player takes no tricks, this is a Jungfrau ("virgin" or "maiden"). If, however, one player can take all the tricks, he has made a Durchmarsch ("march"). It is very common to agree that, in this case he wins the Ramsch.

It is usual to agree a fixed stake for a Ramsch. In Danyliuk and Peschel, a Ramsch is worth double the basic stake i.e. 20¢ is paid to each opponent by the loser and a Jungfrau receives 40¢ from the loser. (Note: It is not clear if this is additional to the loser's normal payout. Merschbacher makes clear that each Jungfrau receives this payment.) A Durchmarsch counts as a Solo won with schwarz and the winner receives 70¢ from each opponent.

In some rules, the payments are simply doubled if someone achieves a Jungfrau.

== Skat ==
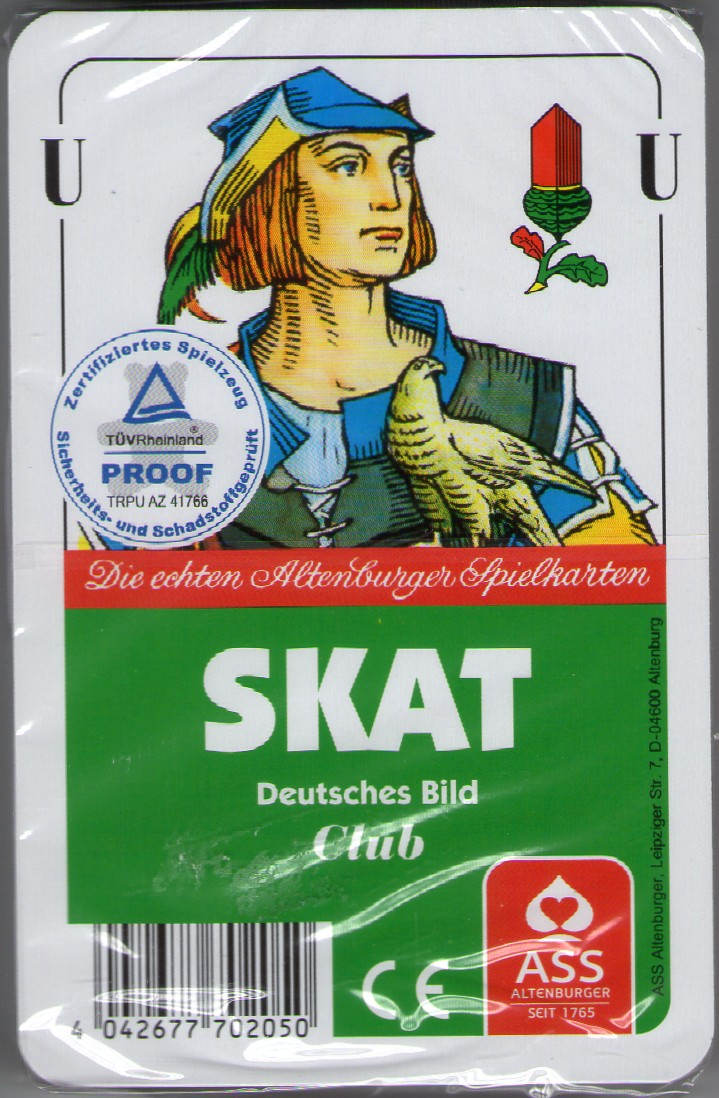
Skat pack

As in Schafkopf, Ramsch is not part of the official rules of Skat. Once again, the aim, unlike normal contracts, is not to score the most card points (Augen), but to achieve a low score, because the player who scores the most points at the end of the hand has lost. In Skat, as in the Grand contract, only the Unters (Jacks) are trumps. Again the card ranking is the same as in Grand (A, 10, K/O, Q/U, ...). The loser has to deduct these points from his score, hence the name, Augenramsch, since Augen are card points in German.

If a player takes no tricks, this is a Jungfrau or Jungfer ("virgin" or "maiden") and the loser's minus points or the agreed stake are doubled. If, however, one player can take all the tricks (both opponents thus remaining Jungfers), he has won a Durchmarsch ("march"). It is very common to agree that, in this case he wins the Ramsch. Then the loser's points are awarded to his opponents or the winner receives 120 plus points. Of course, higher values may be agreed.

== Ramsch as a standalone game ==
Ramsch
- Origin: Germany
- Type: Point-trick
- Players: 3
- Cards: 32
- Deck: German or French
- Rank (high→low): (U/J) A 10 K O/Q 9 8 7 A K O/Q U/J 10 9 8 7
- Play: Alternate
- Playing time: 7-8 minutes/hand

Related games
- Skat (card game), Officers' Skat, Bierskat, Schieberamsch

The following rules are based on the Spielregelbüchlein aus Altenburg:

Ramsch is a very easy trick-taking game of the ace–ten family in which three players aim to take as few points as possible in their tricks. A French-suited, Skat pack of 32 cards is used, the cards ranking and scoring as per the table.

Players may agree that the Tens rank between the Jacks/Unters and Nines. Usually there are no trumps, but sometimes the Jacks or Unters are trumps as in Skat, in which case they rank in the order: J♣, J♠, J♥ and J♦ or U, U, U and U in a German- suited pack.

Deal and play are clockwise. The dealer shuffles, gives each player 10 cards and places the remaining 2 cards face down. Forehand leads to the first trick. Suit must be followed, but there is no compulsion to head the trick. If Jacks are trumps and one is led, players must follow suit with another Jack if able. The trick is won by the highest Jack or by the highest card of the led suit if no Jack is played. The trick winner leads to the next trick.

Pips (card points) taken in tricks are added up at the end and the player with the most is the loser. If a player takes no tricks he is a Jungfer.

=== Variants ===
The Spielregelbüchlein names the following variants:

Simple Ramsch

The loser scores 10 penalty points; 15 if one player is Jungfer and 20 if there are two Jungfers. The 2 downcards remain unviewed. If 2 players have the same score and each has more than the third player, each receives half the penalty points. If all players are level, the deal is not scored.

Pip Ramsch (Augenramsch)

Players score as many penalty points as they have taken pips. The 2 downcards are not scored. If a player makes a Durchmarsch, however, they score 120 plus points which are divided between the losers as 60 penalty points each.

Schieberamsch

After the deal, forehand picks up the 2 downcards and passes 2 cards, face down, to middlehand, who does the same. Finally rearhand discards 2 cards that are reckoned to the last trick. Scoring is as per Pip Ramsch.

== Literature ==
- Danyliuk, Rita (2015). Schafkopf und Doppelkopf (3rd ed.). Hanover: Humboldt. ISBN 978-3-86910-218-4.
- Merschbacher, Adam (2009). Schafkopf: Das anspruchsvolle Kartenspiel (2nd improved ed.). Munich: PLIZ. ISBN 978-3-9812931-0-4.
- Peschel, Wolfgang (1990). Bayerisch Schaffkopfen (2nd ed.). Weilheim: Stöppel. ISBN 3-924012-31-8.
- Spielkartenfabrik Altenburg (1983). "Ramsch". Erweitertes Spielregelbüchlein aus Altenburg [Extended game rule booklet from Altenburg]. Leipzig: Verlag Altenburger Spielkartenfabrik.
- Spielkartenfabrik Altenburg (1988). "Ramsch". Erweitertes Spielregelbüchlein aus Altenburg (8th ed.). Leipzig: Verlag Altenburger Spielkartenfabrik.
