= Zwanzig ab =

German card game

- Origin: Germany
- Alternative names: Zwanzig
- Type: Plain-trick
- Family: Rams group
- Players: 4
- Age range: 8+
- Cards: 32
- Deck: French Skat pack
- Rank (high→low): A K Q J 10 9 8 7
- Play: Clockwise

Related games
- Mulatschak • Mistigri • Schnalzen

Zwanzig ab, 20 ab or simply Zwanzig is card game for four players. It is a member of the Rams family in which the key feature is that players may choose to drop out of the game if they believe their hand is not strong enough to take a minimum number of tricks. It appears to be a recent, internet-propagated variant of Schnalzen or Bohemian Watten. However, the latter has a natural card ranking, is played with double German cards and a Weli, has no exchanging and has a different scoring system. It is suitable for children from 8 upwards. It may be related from Fünf dazu! which is a simpler game described by Gööck in 1967 that has neither trumps nor the option to drop out.

== Aim ==
Each player begins with twenty points and the aim is to be the first to zero, hence the name; zwanzig ab means "twenty down" in German.

== Cards ==
Zwanzig ab! is played with a 32-card Skat pack which may be either French- or German-suited. Card ranking follows the Skat schedule used in ace–ten games:

Ranks and card-point values of cards
German-suited cards	A/D	10	K	O	U	9	8	7
French-suited cards	A	10	K	Q	J	9	8	7

French suits
Clubs	Spades	Hearts	Diamonds
♣	♠	♥	♦
German suits
Acorns	Leaves	Hearts	Bells

== Rules ==
The following rules are largely based on Brostedt:

=== Dealing and trumps ===
Dealing and play are clockwise. The first dealer is chosen by lot. The dealer deals a packet of 2 cards to each player. Forehand, the player to the left of the dealer, then has to announce the trump suit on the basis of the 2 cards he has received. The dealer then deals a further packet of 3 cards to each player and places the rest face down as a talon.

=== Exchanging and dropping out ===
Beginning with forehand, players now have the option of exchanging up to 3 cards with the talon. Having exchanged, players now announce whether they will "play" or "pass" (i.e. drop out of the current deal). Players who drop out, naturally cannot score any points. Forehand, as the declarer, may not drop out. And if diamonds are trumps, all must play.

=== Trick play ===
Forehand leads to the first trick; thereafter the trick winner leads to the next. Players must follow suit or, if unable, play a trump. The aim is to win as many tricks as possible.

=== Scoring ===
Each trick taken scores 1 minus point. If a player fails to take any tricks they must add 5 points to their score. If hearts are trumps, all scores are doubled. If all players bar the declarer drop out, he earns 5 minus points (10 if he announced hearts as trumps). The winner is the first to have no points left. If two players achieve this at the same time, the one who has the greatest minus total wins. If they are both on the same total, the game continues until there is a clear winner.

== Variants ==
Zwanzig ab is not well covered in the literature - Gööck excepted - but there are several rule variants listed online. All feature a 32-card pack, ace–ten ranking, clockwise deal and play, exchanging and dropping out, and trumps being decided by forehand. Their main differences are highlighted below:

- Pagat.com Based on Brostedt. French pack; 5 cards dealt; if Hearts are trumps, scores are doubled; if Diamonds are trumps, all must play; if all bar one drop out, declarer wins all 5 tricks; rules change after 8 deals; no exact score to win. Natural ranking may be an error as Brostedt uses an ace–ten ranking.
- Kartenspiele.net. Brief rules; French pack; 5 cards dealt; if Hearts are trumps, scores are doubled; Hearts Blind contract earns quadruple scores; no exact score to win; trump declarer penalised 40 pts for failing to take a trick.
- WikiBooks. French or German pack; 5 or 6 cards dealt; exact score to win, 4 players swap 2 cards; 5 players swap 3 cards; rules with Württemberg pack; Temmelsen rules.
- Allerkartenspiele.de. French or German pack; 5 or 6 cards dealt; if Hearts are trumps, scores are quadrupled; if Hearts or Clubs are trumps, all must play; exact score to win.

=== Fünf dazu! ===
A simple variant called Fünf dazu! is described by Gööck (1967) and Danyliuk (2017). Here there are no trumps apart from the ♦7 (sometimes even that is omitted). Five cards are dealt and each player starts on 15 points. Suit must be followed (Farbzwang) and the trick must be headed if possible (Stichzwang). Players deduct one point per trick taken or add five penalty points (hence the name) if they fail to take a trick.

== Literature ==
- Danyliuk, Rita (2017). 1x1 der Kartenspiele (19th ed.). Hanover: Humboldt. ISBN 978-3-86910-367-9.
- Gööck, Roland (1967). Freude am Kartenspiel. Gütersloh: Bertelsmann.
