= Schieberamsch =

German card game

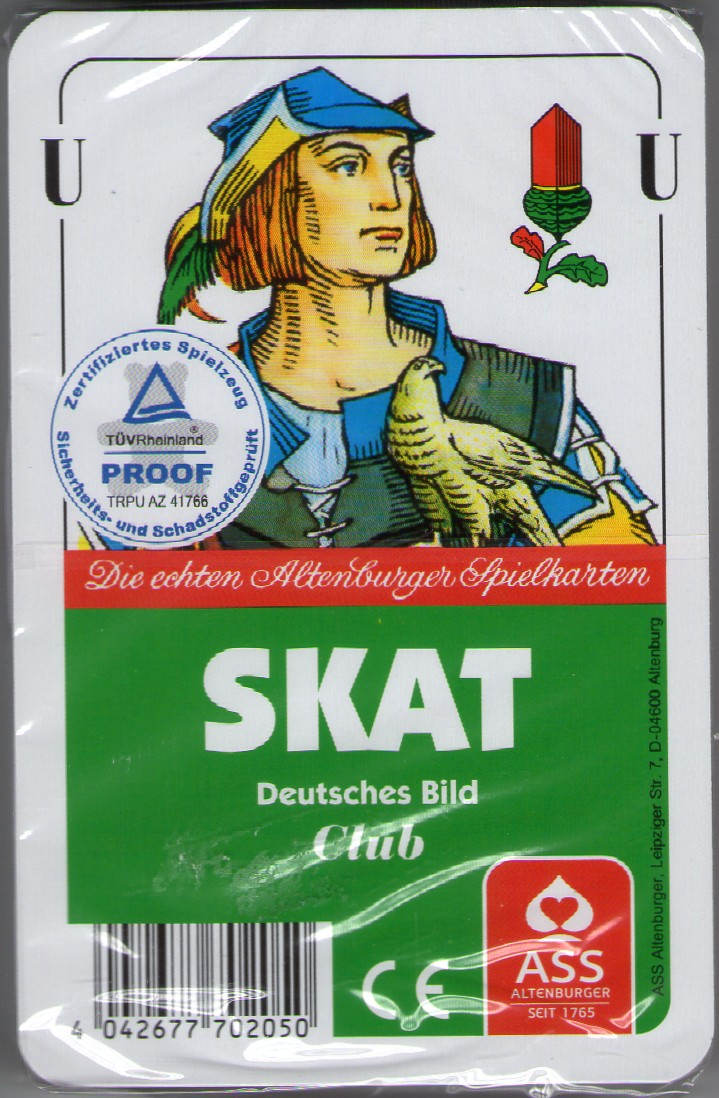
- Skat pack
- Origin: Germany
- Type: Point-trick
- Players: 3
- Cards: 32
- Deck: German or French
- Rank (high→low): (U/J) A 10 K O/Q 9 8 7 A K O/Q U/U 10 9 8 7
- Play: Alternate
- Playing time: 7-8 minutes/hand

Related games
- Skat (card game), Officers' Skat, Bierskat, Ramsch

Schieberamsch is an unofficial contract within the popular German card games, Skat and Schafkopf, but "also makes a good game in its own right." Schieberamsch is a variation of the unofficial Ramsch contract, in which the aim is to score as few points as possible, the difference being that, in Ramsch the skat is left untouched until the end, whereas in Schieberamsch it is passed from player to player with or without an exchange of cards.

== Skat ==
Unlike the basic Ramsch contract in Skat, the first player may pick up the skat (talon) and exchange them for two cards that he is unable to use. He then gives the discards to the next player who, in turn, may discard two cards to the third player. The latter discards two of her cards and the game begins. Ramsch follows the trump rules of the Grand contract in Skat, i. e. only the Unters (Jacks) are trumps.

There are two options for dealing with the points in the skat. In one option, the player who has already scored the most card points (Augen) is given the skat; in another, the player who takes the last trick gets the skat. If two players share the highest score, the skat points are awarded to both. The main difference from Ramsch is that, in Schieberamsch, players may choose to 'shove' or 'push' (schieben) the skat instead of picking it up, hence the name Schieberramsch. If one or more players 'shove', the points deducted from the loser are doubled (four- or eightfold, if 2 or all 3 players 'shove'). It is usually not allowed to discard Unters (Buben or Bauern).

== Jungfrau ==
If a player has not won any tricks by the end of the game, he remains a Jungfrau or Jungfer ("virgin") and the loser's minus points double again. If a player believes he is able to take no tricks at all, he may also declare a Jungfrau. This also doubles the value of the game, but can be risky for the declarer: if he fails to remain a Jungfrau, the game ends immediately, i. e. as soon as he takes a trick, even if it is worth no points and he is penalised with 120 minus points.

== Scoring ==
The aforementioned doubling can lead to very high point losses, which can give Ramsch an undesirably high significance compared with the normal Skat contracts. In order to reduce this imbalance between Ramsch and regular contracts, it can be agreed that each 'shove' and a Jungfrau only raises the multiplication factor of the highest number of points. (1 shove doubles, 2 shoves raises the value threefold, 3 shoves fourfold, 3 shoves + Jungfrau fivefold). This scoring system is often called Augenramsch or Zahlenramsch.

Another way to alleviate an excessive influence of Ramsch contracts is to agree that a fixed number of points are deducted from the loser. For example, a simple loss results in a deduction of 10 points; a Jungfer costs 15 points, but for two Jungfers 20 points are added. Higher values may also be agreed. The doubling or raising for 'shoves' is unaffected.

== Durchmarsch ==
If, however, a player wins all ten tricks, this is called a Durchmarsch (i.e. "march") and, in Augenramsch earns 120 plus points. Doubling by schieben is counted as a rule.

== Grand ==
Usually the rule applies that, per Schieberamsch round, each player has the option of playing an Ausweich Grand (Grand Hand). Or the rules may state that up to three Grand Hands may be played in succession; after that a Pflichtramsch (players must play a normal Schieberramsch). In other variants there are no restrictions at all applied to the Grand Hand game.

== Literature ==
- _ (1988). "Ramsch". In: Spielkartenfabrik Altenburg (publ.): Erweitertes Spielregelbüchlein aus Altenburg. 8th edn. Leipzig: Verlag Altenburger Spielkartenfabrik.
- Parlett, David (2008). The Penguin Book of Card Games, Penguin, London. ISBN 978-0-141-03787-5
