= Bohemian Watten =

Trick-taking card game

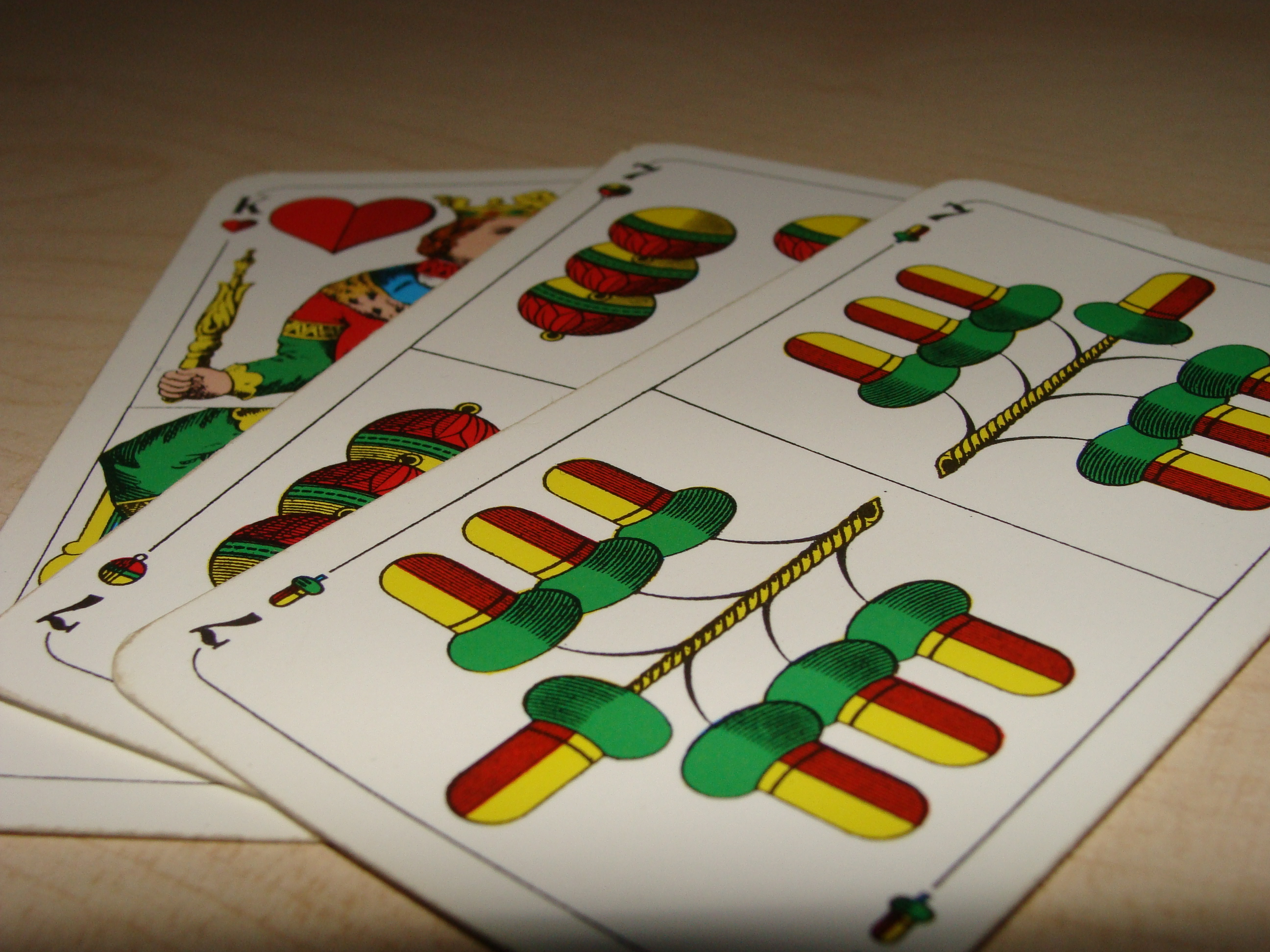
- The three Criticals: Maxi, Belli and Spitz
- Origin: Bavaria
- Type: Plain-trick
- Players: 2-4
- Cards: 32
- Deck: German-suited, Bavarian or Franconian pattern
- Rank (high→low): Trumps: K 7 7 A K O U 10–7; Plain suits: A K O U 10–7
- Play: Clockwise

Related games
- Zwanzig ab

Bohemian Watten, sometimes called Bohemian Ramsen, is a trick-taking card game for two to four players. In fact, Bohemian Watten bears more resemblance to Zwanzig ab, Ramsen and Schnalzen than Watten itself.

== Name ==
The game is known in German as Böhmisch Watten, Kuddeln, Hudln, Hudeln or Böhmisch Ramsen.

== Players and cards ==
Any number from two to four may play. (Note: Since most Bavarian or Franconian pattern packs have 36 cards, in theory up to seven could play.) The sixes are removed from a standard 36-card Bavarian pattern pack to leave 32 cards in play. The suits are: Acorns, Leaves or Grass, Hearts and Bells.

There are three permanent top trumps or "Criticals" (Kritische or Kritten) (Note: Also called "Greeks" (Griechische or Griechen) regionally.) which, together are called the "Machine" (Maschine):

- K is Maxi, the highest card in the game, named after King Maximilian I of Bavaria. (Note: Also called Max, Mäxle, Maxl, Mattl, Papa, Maler ("Artist"), Machtl, Erdbeer-Schorsch ("Strawberry George"), Voda.)
- 7, the second highest card. (Note: Also called Benno, Bello, Belle, Bölle.)
- 7 is Spitz. (Note: Also called Spitze, Seuchl, Soacher, Soach, Bsoachter, Sächer, Bisi, Bise, Gspeitz.)

Apart from the Criticals, cards rank in their natural order within their suits i.e. A > K > O > U > 10 > 9 > 8 > 7, where O is the Ober and U the Unter.

== Aim ==
Players start with 20 points and aim to be first to zero by taking as many tricks as possible; each trick being worth minus 1 point. Players who take no tricks must add 5 points to their running totals. If the trump suit is Hearts, all points are doubled.

== Deal ==
The first dealer is usually either the youngest player or the one who cuts the highest card from the pack. The dealer shuffles the pack and has it cut by the player to the right. Deal and play are clockwise.

== Cutting ==
Cutting is an important ritual that can have a bearing on the outcome of the game. If the cut card is a Critical, the cutter may take it; this is often called schlecking. If the next card is also a Critical, the dealer may take it. A third Critical may also be taken by the cutter. If the cutter declines to take the first Critical, the dealer may not take a second one. Unusually, the cutter may pick up the entire pack to look at the bottom card.

Once the cutting ritual is over, the dealer completes the cut and deals, in the normal case, a packet of 3 cards each, face down and beginning with forehand to the left, and then a second packet of two cards each. A player who took one or more Criticals during cutting receives one or two cards in the first packet to ensure they end up with five cards. Between the two rounds of dealing, the dealer turns the next card of the stock over for trump. The winner may deal first in the next hand.

Variations:

- Only the cutter has the right to schleck.
- The cutter simply cuts the pack and the dealer completes the cut.

== Exchanging ==
After the deal, each player must decide whether to play or fold, with the exception of the dealer who must play. A player to elects to play may exchange up to three cards from the stock, but the dealer, who has the right to exchange with the trump upcard, may only exchange two from stock for that reason. At least two players must remain active in each hand.

Variation: the dealer may exchange 3 cards from stock as well as the trump upcard.

Players may not fold in the first hand, if Hearts are trumps, if they have 5 points or fewer, if they sat out in the previous hand, if they are the dealer or if they are the cutter and everyone else has folded.

== Play ==
Forehand leads to the first trick. Players must follow suit if able and must overtake in that suit if they can. If unable to follow suit, they must trump and overtrump if possible. If a trump is led, players must overtrump if they can.

Variation: overtaking is not compulsory.

== Scoring ==
At the start of the game, one player is nominated as the scribe to keep score.

Each player starts with a tally of 20 points, the aim of the game is to reach zero. For each trick taken, one point is deducted from the tally; if no trick is taken in a game, 5 penalty points are added. If Hearts are declared as the trump suit, the points count double, i.e. -2 points per trick or +10 points for no trick, and you may not fold, which is possible with other suits.

There are variations over what happens if a player overshoots zero and ends up with a minus score:

- It is immaterial and the player wins.
- The overshoot is added to the original score.

There is always at least one winner and one loser; depending on the final scores there may more of either.

Variation: a player who scores plus 50 wins; if another player simultaneously scores 0, they both win.

== Comparison with Watten ==
The biggest differences in Bohemian Watten compared with standard Watten are rules of play such as following suit, the manner in which trumps are determined, there are no Strikers, no teams and, consequently, no signalling. Despite its name, the game is much closer to Zwanzig ab.

== Bibliography ==
- Rohrmayer, Erich (2017). Lerne Böhmisch Watten und Grasobern. Regenstauf: Buch- und Kunstverlag Oberpfalz. ISBN 978-3-95587-056-0
- Sirch, Walter (2008). Vom Alten zum Zwanzger – Bayerische Kartenspiele for Kinder and Erwachsene – neu entdeckt. Traunstein: Bayerischer Trachtenverband.
