= Zaisertshofen =

- Village of Tussenhausen
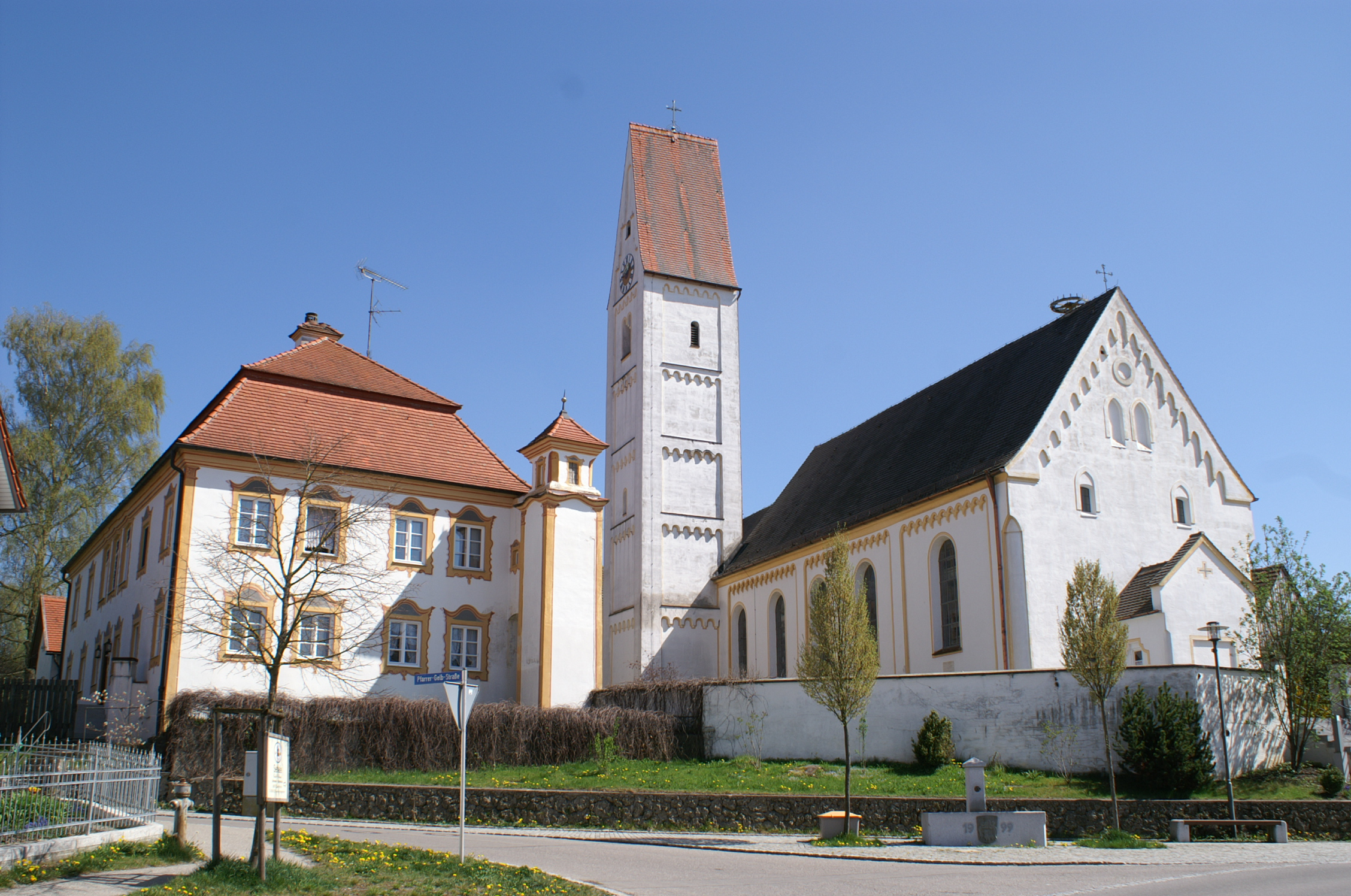
- St. Silvester's Church
- Interactive map of Zaisertshofen
- Location within Germany Location within Bavaria
- Coordinates: 48°07′16″N 10°32′23″E
- Country: Germany
- State: Bavaria
- District: Unterallgäu
- Municipality: Tussenhausen
- Elevation: 554 m (1,818 ft)
- Time zone: UTC+01:00 (CET)
  - Summer (DST): UTC+02:00 (CEST)
- Postal codes: 86874
- Dialling codes: 08261, 08268

Zaisertshofen is a parish (Pfarrdorf) and part of the market municipality of Tussenhausen in the Upper Swabian district of Unterallgäu in the south German state of Bavaria.

== History ==
The parish church of St. Silvester is a late Gothic building from the second half of the 15th century. In 1471, Eglof von Riedheim acquired the village of Zaisertshofen along with the lordship of Angelberg. In the course of the administrative reforms in the Kingdom of Bavaria at that time, the municipality was under the 1818 Municipal Act. With the incorporation of Zaisertshofen into Tussenhausen on 1 May 1978, the municipality lost its political independence.

== Sport and leisure ==
The village boasts a volunteer fire service as well as a fishing club, Formula One and classic cars club and shooting club. The local Tennis and Sports Club (TSV Zaisertshofen) offers football, gymnastics and tennis. The village also hosts Ramsch tournaments, known as 'world championships', for players of this unusual Bavarian variant of the card game, Rams.
