= Lampeln =

Card game

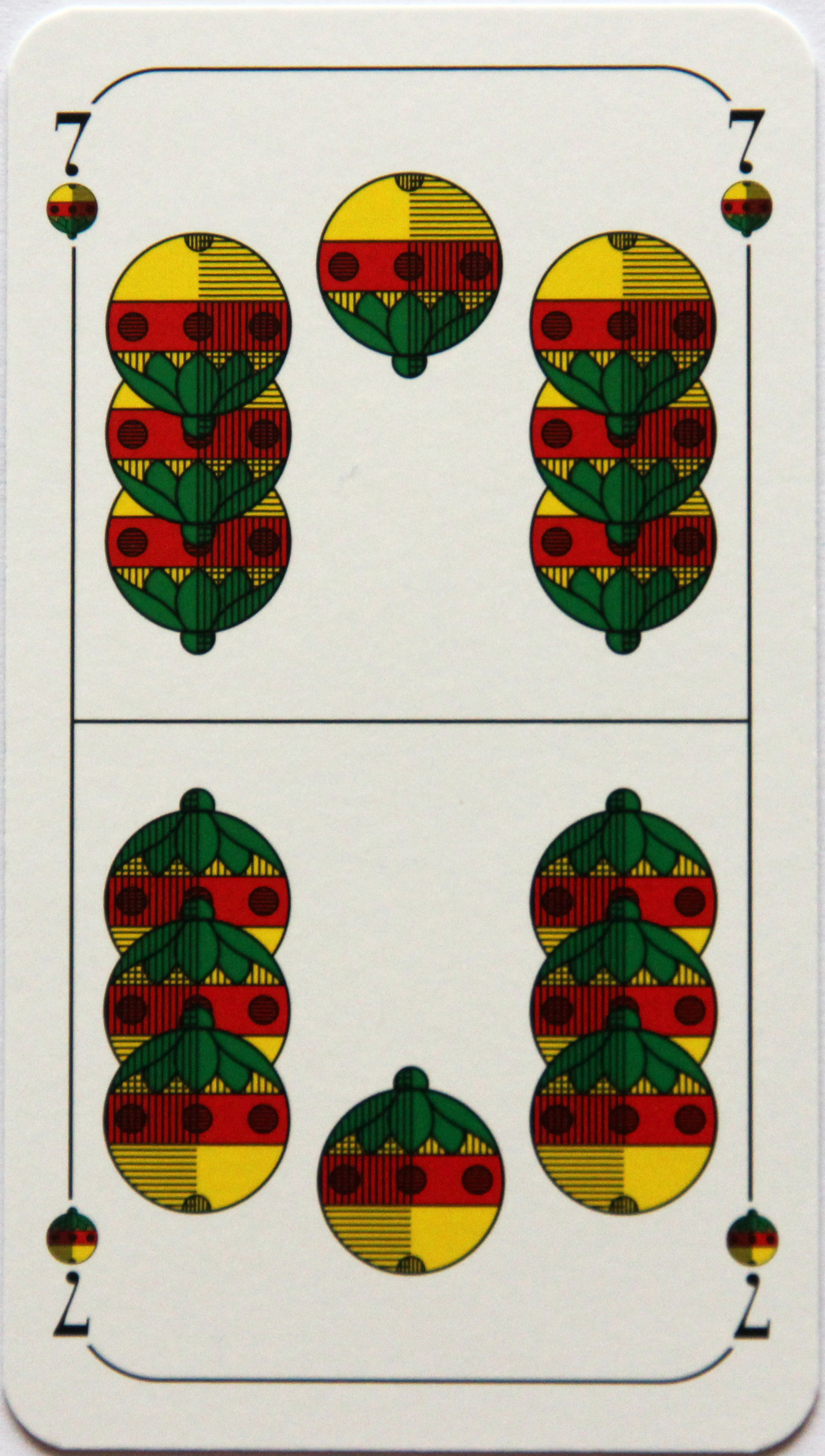
- The Belli; the permanent, 2nd-highest trump
- Origin: Austria, Bavaria
- Type: Plain-trick
- Family: Rams group
- Players: 4
- Cards: 32
- Deck: German pack
- Rank (high→low): A K O U 10 9 8 7
- Play: Clockwise
- Playing time: 25-30 min/round

Related games
- Mulatschak • Ramsen • Schnalzen • Schnellen

Lampeln or Lampln is an old Bavarian and Austrian plain-trick card game that is still played in a few places today. It is one of the Rams group of card games characterised by allowing players to drop out of the current game if they think they will be unable to win any tricks or a minimum number of tricks.

== Background ==
Historically, Lampeln was banned in the Austro-Hungarian Empire in 1904 as a game of chance usually played for money; this ban was confirmed by the Austrian government in 1933.

The game was played by Bavarian peasants in the 19th century alongside Handeln, Grasobern, Zwicken and Hopfen, and by Bavarian troops in the First World War and, today, Lampeln is still played in the Austrian states of Salzburg and Upper Austria as well as in Old Bavaria, Germany (Upper Bavaria, Lower Bavaria and the Upper Palatinate). In 2017, volunteer firemen at the fire station in Schäflohe claimed to be the only ones in the province of Upper Palatinate who played Lampeln.

The name is derived from lampeln (Bavarian: lambben) which means lambing, because players who fail to take the minimum two tricks are called 'lambs'.

== Aim ==
To take as many tricks as possible, but in any case a minimum of two to avoid a penalty.

== Austrian Lampeln ==
The Austrian variant of Lampeln is more complicated that its Bavarian counterpart. Its distinguishing feature is 'hop and jump', whereby the role of dealer may switch to another player as a result of the cut and further contributions are paid to build up the pot more rapidly, which gives this variant more of a gambling flavour. In this respect it resembles Kratzen and Zwicken.

=== Cards ===
The game is usually played with 32 cards from a 36-card Tell pattern pack. The Seven of Bells is permanently the second highest trump and is nicknamed the Belli.

=== Deal and cut ===
The first dealer of a session is the youngest player. Thereafter the role of dealer rotates clockwise. The hand begins with the dealer paying an ante of 40 euro cents to the pot (Stock or Kassa) and shuffling the pack.

The player on the dealer's right cuts. In doing so, the cutter looks at the bottom card of the top packet without revealing it. Unless the card is an Ace (Sau) the 7 or 8, the dealer proceeds to deal the cards as described below. If, however, the bottom card is one of the aforementioned cards then a new deal is initiated as follows:

- Ace - if it is an Ace, the bottom card of the bottom packet is exposed:
  - if it is not another Ace, the role of dealer passes to forehand (on the dealer's left) who pays 40 cents to the pot and shuffles the cards for a new hand.
  - if it is a second Ace, the whole pack is 'loaded' (geladen). Forehand and third hand (left of dealer) pay 40 cents to the pot and second hand (opposite the dealer) takes over as dealer.
- 8 - if it is the 8 (Katzengeist), then forehand becomes the new dealer (as in the case of a single Ace above)
- 7 - if it is the 7 (Belli), everyone pays 40 cents to the pot and the same dealer reshuffles.

The Ace, 7 and 8 must always be shown to the other players.

The dealer now deals 8 cards, clockwise, to each player in packets of 3, 2 and 3. The dealer's fifth card is flipped to determine the trump suit. If it happens to be the 7, the dealer may choose any suit as trumps before looking at his or her hand.

Beginning with forehand, the players announce, in clockwise order, whether they will "play" (mitgehen = "go with [the dealer]") or "pass" (daheimbleiben = "I'll stay at home") i.e. drop out of the current deal. The dealer always has to play. If all three players stay at home, the dealer wins all 8 tricks automatically. If there are only 40 cents (or fewer) left in the pot at the beginning of a deal, it is an 'empty game' (leeres Spiel) and no-one is allowed to stay at home.

=== Play ===
Forehand leads to the first trick. Thereafter the winner of the trick leads to the next. Players must follow suit, or trump if unable, and must win the trick if they can. (Note: That is, Farbzwang, Trumpfzwang and Stechzwang apply.) A player who cannot follow suit or trump, may discard any card.

==== Scoring ====
Players win 1/8 of the pot for each trick taken. However, any player who takes fewer than two tricks is a 'lamb' (German: Lamm, Bavarian: lambbe) and has to pay penalty into the pot equivalent to the money remaining once the payments for tricks have been made. If there are two or three 'lambs', then each one has to pay the full amount. For example, supposing the players pay 20 cents each to the pot in each deal and the pot has built up to 160 cents. If one player wins five tricks and the rest win 1 trick each; the winner receives 50 cents and the others 10 cents each, leaving 80 cents in the pot. The three players who failed to take the minimum two tricks must each pay 80 cents into the pot (i.e. the equivalent of what was left in the pot after the payouts).

== Bavarian Lampeln ==
This is simpler than the Austrian version, primarily because it omits the 'hop and jump' feature and makes it more suitable as a social, rather than a gambling, game.

=== Cards ===
A 32-card, German-suited Schafkopf pack is used in Bavaria. The Seven of Bells has the same role as a permanent trump, ranking just below the Ace, and is nicknamed the Beankei (pronounced "beh ank-eye"), which means "a reward" or "rewarding" (from beanken, "to reward").

=== Deal ===
Each player antes e.g. 16¢ to start the pool (Stock). (Note: The pool must be divisible by 8.) The dealer shuffles and the player to the right cuts. The bottom card of the top stack is placed face up and determines the trump suit. The dealer looks at the bottom 3 cards of the pack in the light of the trump suit (all of which he would get anyway from the deal) and decides whether to play or not, depending on whether he has further trumps in addition to the trump upcard. If not, the cards are thrown in, players add a further stake to the pot and the next player deals. If the dealer decides to "play" (ich spiele or i spui) then 2 × 4 cards are dealt in clockwise order beginning with forehand. Now the other players decide whether to play or "pass" (weg or weida), based on the number of trumps and Aces they hold. A game is viable if at least 2 players offer to play.

=== Play ===
Players must follow suit, or trump if unable, and must win the trick if they can. (Note: That is, Farbzwang, Trumpfzwang and Stechzwang apply.) A player who cannot follow suit or trump, may discard any card.

=== Scoring ===
To score, a player now has to win at least 2 tricks. The money in the pot, which must always be divisible by 8, is distributed among the trick winners. A player who wins no tricks or just one trick is 'sunk' (untergegangen) and has to pay a full stake (16¢) into the pot. Once the pot is empty, a new game is started and everyone pays the ante in again. This is called a Hudere. If one or more players 'sink', the pool gets replenished from the penalty payments alone – no ante is required.

== Literature ==
- Geiser, Remigius (2004). "100 Kartenspiele des Landes Salzburg" (PDF). Talon (13).
- Geiser, Remigius (2009). "Lampeln" (PDF). Talon (18).
- Hubel, Karl (1924). Das K.B. Landwehr-Infanterie-Regiment Nr. 15. Bavarian War Archives.
- Schlicht, Josef (1875). Bayerisch Land und bayerisch Volk Munich: Huttler.
- Sirch, Walter (2008). Vom Alten zum Zwanzger – Bayerische Kartenspiele for Kinder and Erwachsene – neu entdeckt. Bayerischer Trachtenverband.
