= Mulatschak =

Austrian card game

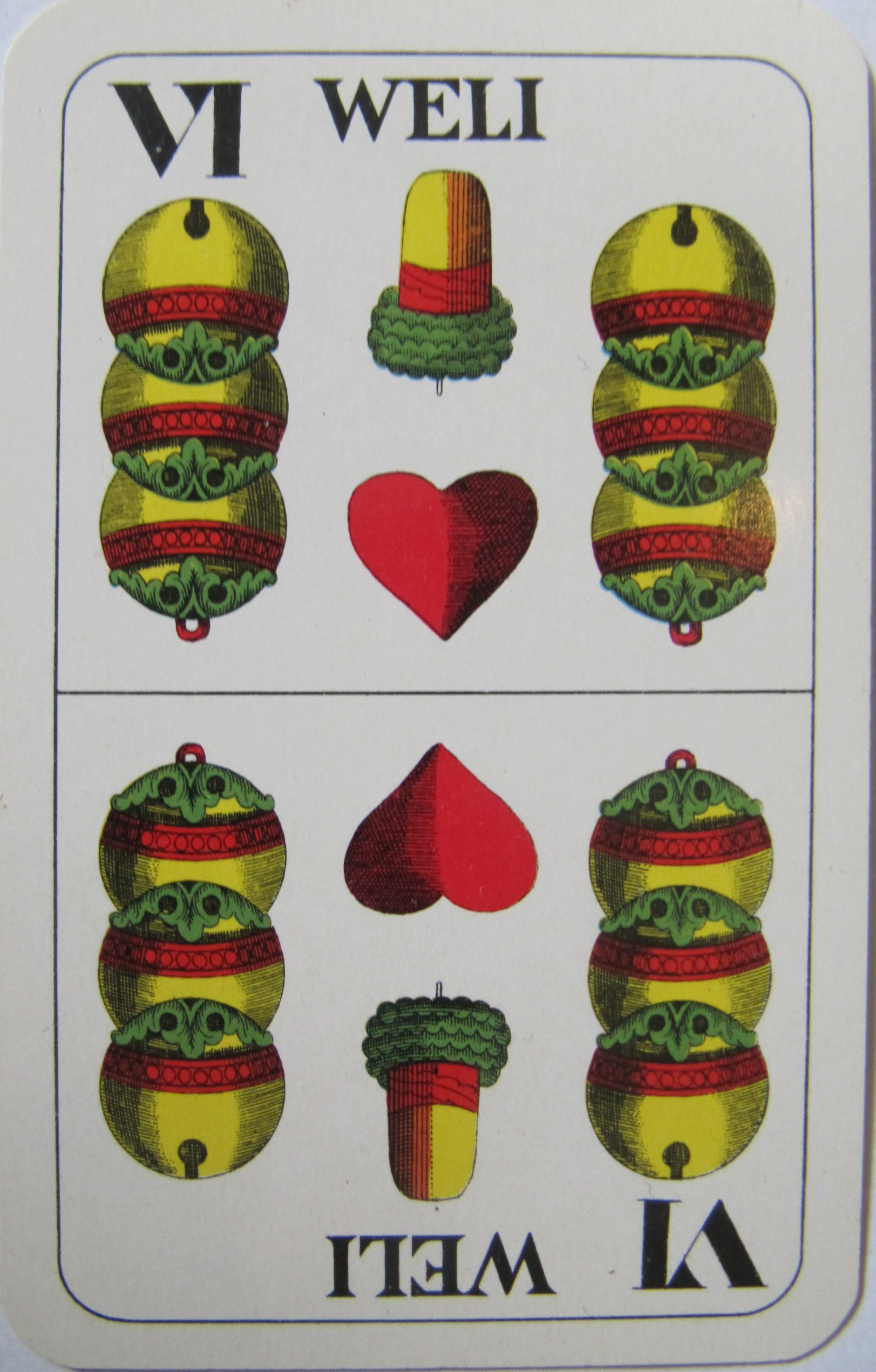
- The Weli, permanent, 2nd highest trump
- Origin: Austria
- Alternative names: Fuchzenawa, Murln, Murlen
- Type: Plain-trick
- Family: Rams group
- Players: 2–5 (3–4 best)
- Cards: 36
- Deck: William Tell pack
- Rank (high→low): A K O U 10 9 8 7
- Play: Clockwise

Related games
- Lampeln • Ramsen • Schnalzen, Schnellen

Mulatschak or Fuchzenawa ("Fifteen Down") is an Austrian card game for two to five players that comes from the Salzburg area and is considered the quintessential game of the region. Although Mulatschak has been called the national card game of Salzburg, its rules were almost certainly unpublished before 2004. Mulatschak is a member of the Rams family in which the key feature is that players may choose to drop out of the game if they believe their hand is not strong enough to take a minimum number of tricks. There is a variant known as Murln or Murlen, which is played in Vienna and the Styria.

== Background ==
The word mulatschak is Hungarian in origin (mulatság), meaning "merriment" or "amusement", and refers to the traditional evening drinks celebration where the glasses are hurled against the wall. The alternative name of Fuchzenawa means "fifteen down".

Mulatschak is a member of the Rams family whose distinctive feature is that players may choose to opt out of a particular deal if they believe their cards are not sufficiently good to win a trick or the minimum specified number of tricks.

Geiser writes that Mulatschak "may justifiably be called the national card game of the state of Salzburg", because not only is it one of the most popular games in the Austrian state, especially among the young and middle-age groups, but it is rarely played anywhere else. It is thus quintessentially representative of Salzburg culture. However, no written records of the game have been found in Austria, Germany, or elsewhere, so Geiser believes his article marks the first time the rules have been published. This assertion was supported independently by McLeod in 2005.

== Rules ==
Mulatschak is usually played by 4 players who each start with a score of 15 points (Geiser) or 21 points (Murln). The following rules are based on Geiser.

=== Aim ===
The aim is to win tricks in order to be the first to get one's score down to zero.

=== Cards ===
Acorns (Eichel)	Leaves (Laab)	Hearts (Herz)	Bells (Schell)

Mulatschak is played with a Double German (William Tell) pack comprising four suits – Acorns, Leaves, Hearts and Bells – and 36 cards, ranking as follows: Sow (Deuce or Ace) > King > Ober > Unter > Ten > Nine > Eight > Seven > Six. The Weli is the permanent, second-highest trump card.

=== Dealing and cutting ===
The dealer shuffles and offers the cards to rearhand to cut. Rearhand may peek at the bottom card of the top packet. If it turns out to be the Weli, he may schleck it i.e. add it to his hand, having shown it to the other players. Otherwise the remaining players may not see which card it is. The dealer then deals 5 cards to each player (4 to rearhand if he has schleckt the Weli) in one packet of 3 cards and another of 2 cards. Any player with a 'whiteout' (Weiße) i.e. no court cards, declares it. The cards are then redealt and the next deal counts double.

=== Bidding ===
Beginning with forehand, each player, in clockwise order, now announces the number of tricks they think they will win, from 0 to 5. Players must outbid the previous highest bid or "pass", apart from the dealer who may "hold" (by saying selber) the highest bid. The bidding continues around until a bid pass been passed by all other players. The winning bidder becomes the declarer and chooses the trump suit.

Players may bid a Mulatschak, which is an undertaking to win every trick without an exchange of cards (see below). A player can only bid Mulatschak at their first bidding opportunity.

=== Exchanging ===
The declarer then has the option of exchanging any number of cards from his hand with those from the talon. The way this is done is as follows: the declarer places their card or cards face down on the table and then is dealt the same number of cards from the dealer’s remaining stock.

There are two situations where additional cards are added to the exchange: if the player has discarded only one card or if the player has discarded all five cards in their hand. In these situations, the players receives another card 'on sight' (auf Sicht), i.e. dealt face up. The player may choose to exchange for this card by discarding another card from their hand and taking up the on sight card in its place. If the face up card is a trump and the player takes it up, they receive an additional card on sight which they may again choose to exchange for. This procedure repeats until a non-trump appears as the on sight card (the player may still choose whether to exchange for it, but no further on sight cards will be dealt) or until the player chooses not to exchange for the on sight card.

After the declarer exchanges card, the remaining players then announce whether they will "play" (mitgehen) or "stay at home" (daheimbleiben). If they stay at home, they place their cards face down on the table and take no further part in the current deal. If they play, they may exchange cards in the same manner as described above for the declarer, as long as cards remain in the talon.

There are four situations in which players are not permitted may stay at home:

- If all the others players elect to stay at home, the player to the dealer's right may not stay at home
- If a player has 5 or fewer points, that player may not stay at home
- If Hearts are trumps, no one may stay at home
- If Mulatschak is declared, no one may stay at home

Additionally, there are two situations in which players are not permitted to exchange cards:

- If a player has 3 or fewer points, that player may not exchange cards
- If Mulatschak is declared, no one may exchange cards

=== Trick-taking ===
The declarer leads to the first trick; thereafter the winner of a trick leads to the next. Players must follow suit (Farbzwang) and must head the trick if possible (Stichzwang).

=== Scoring ===
For each trick taken, one point is deducted (tilgen or herunterschreiben) from the score. A summary of the point system is as follows:

- Every trick won – 1 minus point
- Mulatschak won – 10 minus points
- Stayed at home – 1 plus point
- No tricks – 5 plus points
- Declarer fails to achieve bid – 10 plus points
- Declarer fails to achieve Mulatschak – 10 plus points; rest earn 10 minus points

If Hearts are trumps, all the above scores are doubled. If a whiteout was called on the previous deal, all the above scores are doubled. If a whiteout was called on the previous deal and Hearts are trumps, all the above scores are quadrupled.

== Murln ==
The variant known as Murln or Murlen differs from the above rules as follows:

The game may be played by 2 to 5 players; 3 to 4 being best. With 5 players, restrict exchanging or one sits out each time. A rubber comprises 2 or more deals.

Only 33 cards are used, the Sixes are removed except for the Weli.

The first dealer is chosen by lot. Players draw cards from the pack and the player with the highest card deals first. With 4 players, no more than 3 cards may be exchanged.

Murln is played from 21 points, not 15, and 'staying at home' costs 2 plus points, not one. A Murler is the equivalent of a Mulatschak. Winning a Murler earns 10 points, but costs the others 20 plus points. Losing a Murler costs the declarer 20 points and the rest earn 10 minus points.

== Literature ==
- Geiser, Remigius (2004). "100 Kartenspiele des Landes Salzburg", in Talon, Issue 13, pp. 37 & 40.
- McLeod, John (2005). "Playing the Game: Schnellen, Hucklebuck and Donut" in The Playing-Card Journal Vol 30, No. 2, p. 288.
