= Schnalzen =

Card game

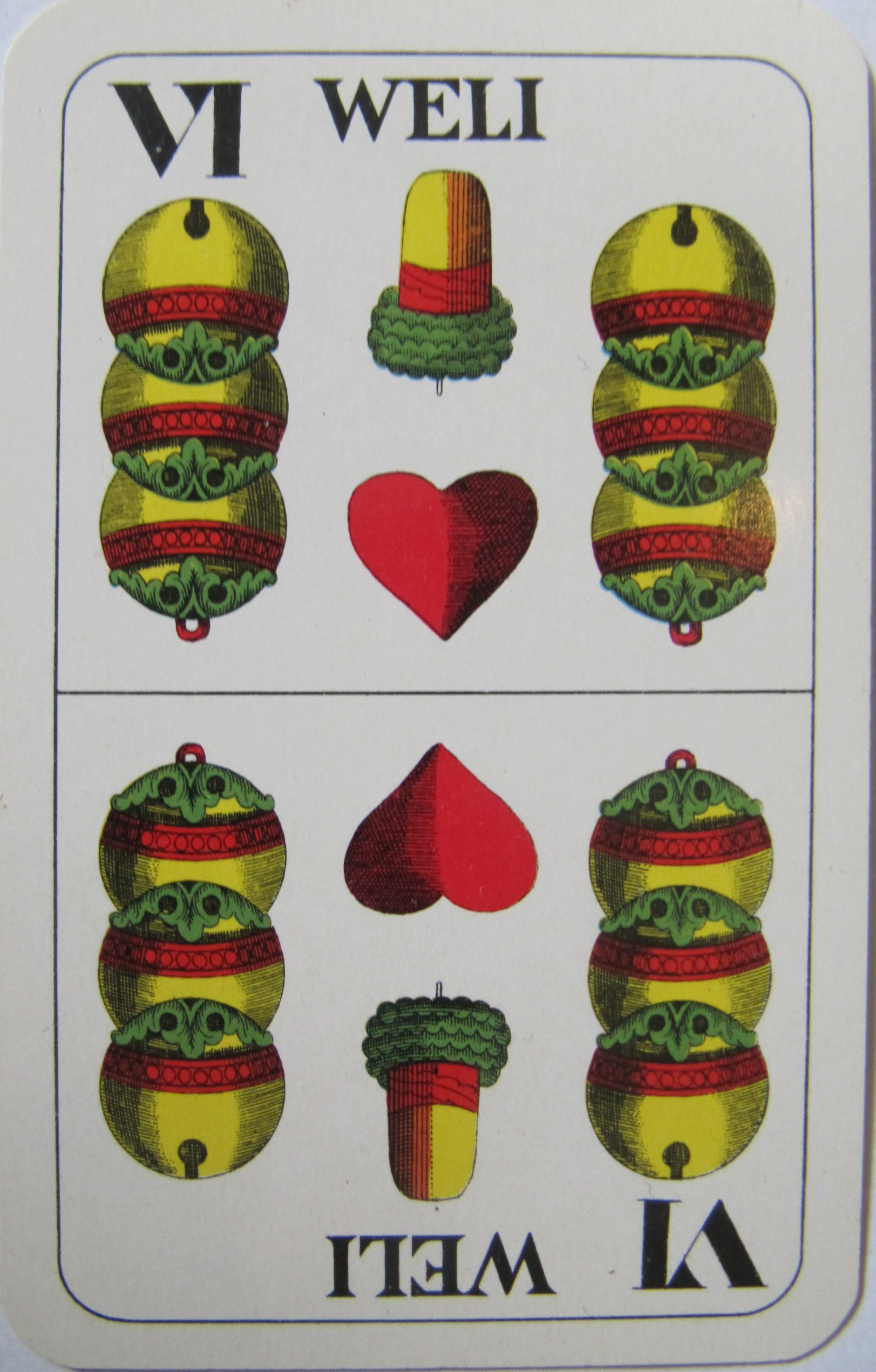
- The Weli, the permanent 2nd highest trump
- Origin: Germany
- Alternative names: Zwanzgerln
- Type: Plain-trick
- Family: Rams group
- Players: 4
- Cards: 33
- Deck: German
- Rank (high→low): A K O U 10 9 8 7

Related games
- Lampeln • Mulatschak • Ramsen • Schnellen
- Features: 5 cards, no exchanging, Weli as special trump, game is 20 points

Schnalzen is an Austrian card game for 4 players and a member of the Rams group of games in which the key feature is that players may choose to drop out of the game if they believe their hand is not strong enough to take a minimum number of tricks. It is, broadly speaking, Ramsen with the Weli as the second-highest trump. Players are dealt 5 cards and may not exchange. The Weli is the second-highest trump and game is 20 points.

== Distribution ==
Schnalzen is played in the Austrian states of Salzburg, Carinthia, Burgenland and the Styria. It has also gained a following in Barwedel near Brunswick in Germany, having been brought there from Austria.

== Rules ==
The following rules are based on the game as played in Großgmain in Salzburg state.

=== Aim ===
The aim of Schnalzen is to win tricks in order to be the first to get one's score from 20 down to zero.

=== Cards ===
Acorns (Eichel)	Leaves (Laab)	Hearts (Herz)	Bells (Schell)

Schnalzen is played with a Double German (William Tell) pack comprising 4 suits - Acorns, Leaves, Hearts and Bells - and 33 cards, ranking as follows: Sow (Deuce or Ace) > King > Ober > Unter > Ten > Nine > Eight > Seven, plus the 6, the Weli, which is always the second-highest trump card after the Trump Sow.

=== Playing ===
Schnalzen is usually played by 4 players who each start with a score of 20 (penalty) points ([Straf-]Punkte).

==== Dealing ====
The dealer deals a packet of 3 cards to each player in turn, turns the next face up for trump and then deals another packet of 2 cards to each player.

If the trump is a Ten, everyone has to play (mitgehen).

==== Staying at home ====
Beginning with forehand, each player, in clockwise order, now elects to either to 'play' or to 'stay at home' (daheimbleiben) i.e. to drop out of the current deal; in which case they receive an additional penalty point.

The dealer may not step out; other players may do so if they have more than 5 points left, in which case only 1 plus point is added to their score.

==== Trick-taking and scoring ====
Each trick taken counts as one point off the score. Winning all the tricks is rewarded with a deduction of 10 points and the others must add 10 penalty points to their score. If a player plays, but fails to take any tricks, he is 'whipped' (geschnalzt, hence the name of the game) and incurs an additional 10 penalty points.

The winner is the first player to reach zero points first. The remaining players then pay out an amount corresponding to their respective points difference.

== Zwanzgerln ==
According to Geiser, Zwanzgerln, a game played in Eugendorf in Salzburg, may be synonymous with Schnalzen.

== Zwanzig ab ==
Zwanzig ab is a similar game, possibly a recent, internet-based derivative, played without the Weli using French-suited cards and with additional rules such as exchanging.

== Literature ==
- Geiser, Remigius (2004). "100 Kartenspiele des Landes Salzburg" (PDF). Talon (13). Archived from the original (PDF) on 27 August 2018.
