= Oma Skat =

German two-player card game

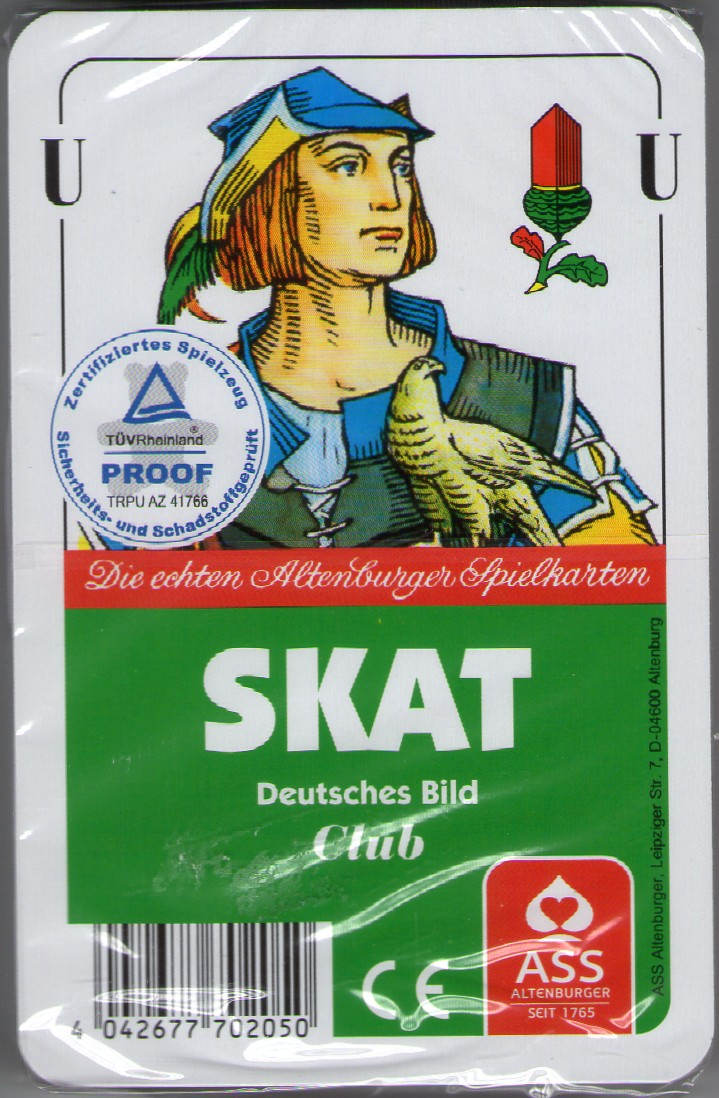
- German-suited cards
- Origin: Germany
- Type: Point-trick
- Players: 2
- Cards: 32
- Deck: German or French
- Rank (high→low): (U/J) A 10 K O/Q 9 8 7 A K O/Q U/U 10 9 8 7 (Null)
- Play: Alternate
- Playing time: 7-8 minutes/hand

Related games
- Skat • Officers' Skat • Bierskat

Oma Skat or Grandmother's Skat (in German, also Blinden-Skat or Skat mit totem Mann) is a variation of the card game, Skat, for two players. It is especially popular in the Lüneburg Heath area of north Germany, but is also played in other parts of Germany, albeit sometimes under other, regional names.

The game is usually played when a third player is unavailable, but also to introduce beginners to the Germany's most popular card game, as it is easier to play than conventional Skat.

== Rules ==
Oma Skat is played like normal Skat, except that the third player is a hidden stack of cards (the "Oma" or "grandmother") from which, for each trick, the top card is turned and played to the trick; clearly, therefore, Oma does not have to follow suit. Oma always chooses to "pass" during the bidding phase, i.e. she does not bid against the two players. The players must therefore outbid each other and work out who goes first. So Oma always plays with one of the players against his or her opponent. Otherwise the usual Skat rules apply. This creates situations that would not occur in normal Skat. For example it is very difficult in Oma Skat to win a "null" game (to win no tricks) because Oma does not have to follow suit.

== Variation ==
A variation is that, in each trick, the Oma card is just given to the player who wins the (two-card) trick.

== See also ==
- Skat scoring
- Skat terminology
