= Ramscheln =

German card game

- The 7 of Diamonds, often the 2nd highest trump
- Origin: Germany
- Type: Plain-trick
- Family: Rams group
- Players: 3–5
- Cards: 32
- Deck: German or Piquet pack
- Rank (high→low): A K Q J 10 9 8 7 A K O U 10 9 8 7
- Play: Clockwise
- Playing time: 15 minutes

Related games
- Contra, Kratzen, Lupfen, Mauscheln, Mistigri, Ramsen, Tippen
- Features: pot, 5 cards, 7♦ as 2nd highest trump, dropping out, slam

Ramscheln, also called Ramsch, is a German card game for three to five players, which is usually played for small stakes. It is a variant of Mönch and a member of the Rams group of card games characterised by allowing players to drop out of the current game if they think they will be unable to win any tricks or a minimum number of tricks. It should not be confused with Ramsch, an unofficial contract in Skat, played when everyone passes, in which the aim is not to score the most card points.

== History ==
Ramscheln is clearly related to the Franco-German game of Rams and Moss states it is a German descendant of Euchre. As early as 1868, Hoyles states that the American game of Rounce "is derived from the German game of Ramsch," and in 1877, a Bavarian dictionary describes Ramsch as a card game popular with the riffraff. In 1929, Hoyles states that Rams, Bierspiel and Rounce are "all American versions of the old German game Ramsch", the first two using 32 cards, the last-named, 52. It is recorded as early as 1904 in Germany. It was certainly popular in the early 20th century among the Danube Swabians, for example in Hungary and Romania, where it was played alongside Ziechmariasch by the menfolk during the winter evenings, and the game was brought back to Germany with refugees after the Second World War.

== Cards ==
Ramscheln is played with 32 cards, traditionally of a German-suited pack, but may also be played with a Piquet pack. The suits are given in the table below. Card ranking is: Ace > King > Queen / Ober > Jack / Unter > Ten > Nine > Eight > Seven. In many places, the 7♦ / 7 is the permanent, 2nd-highest trump and outranks all cards except for the trump Ace.

Playing card suits
German deck				
French deck				
Name of the suits	Hearts (Herz) / Hearts (Herz)	Bells (Schellen) / Diamonds (Karo)	Leaves (Laub) / Spades (Pik)	Acorns (Eichel) / Clubs (Kreuz, Treff)

== Rules ==
The following rules for Ramscheln are based on Kastner and Folkvord.

The dealer antes five chips to the pot, deals five cards (3+2) to each player and to a widow in the middle of the table. The next card is turned as trumps and the rest are placed to one side and are out of play. Players now bid in order, saying whether they will "play" or "pass" or declare a "ramsch". Any player, in turn, may pick up the widow in exchange for his hand cards, but must then play. If the pot only contains the basic stake, everyone has to play; no-one may pass i.e. drop out of the current deal. If all pass, the dealer gets five chips from the player on his right. If only one player wants to play, the dealer must also play. The player may, however, exchange the trump upcard for a poorer card from his hand.

Ramsch is an undertaking to win all five tricks and is the equivalent of Rams or Rounce in Rams. If ramsch is announced, everyone has to play; no-one may drop out.

Players must follow suit, trump if unable and head the trick if possible.

Players earn one fifth of the pot for each trick taken. In the case of a successful ramsch, the winner gets the pot and five chips from each player. If he loses, he doubles the pot and he pays each player five chips. The ramsch breaker, however, gets no additional bonus.

In some places, the 7♦ / 7 is the permanent, 2nd highest trump.

== See also ==
- Tippen or Dreiblatt
- Zwicken
- Mistigri

== Literature ==
- Geiser, Remigius (2004). "100 Kartenspiele des Landes Salzburg" (PDF). Talon (13). Archived from the original (PDF) on 27 August 2018.
- Kastner, Hugo; Folkvord, Gerald Kador (2005). Die große Humboldt-Enzyklopädie der Kartenspiele. Baden-Baden: Humboldt. ISBN 978-3-89994-058-9.
