= Knektpass =

Card game

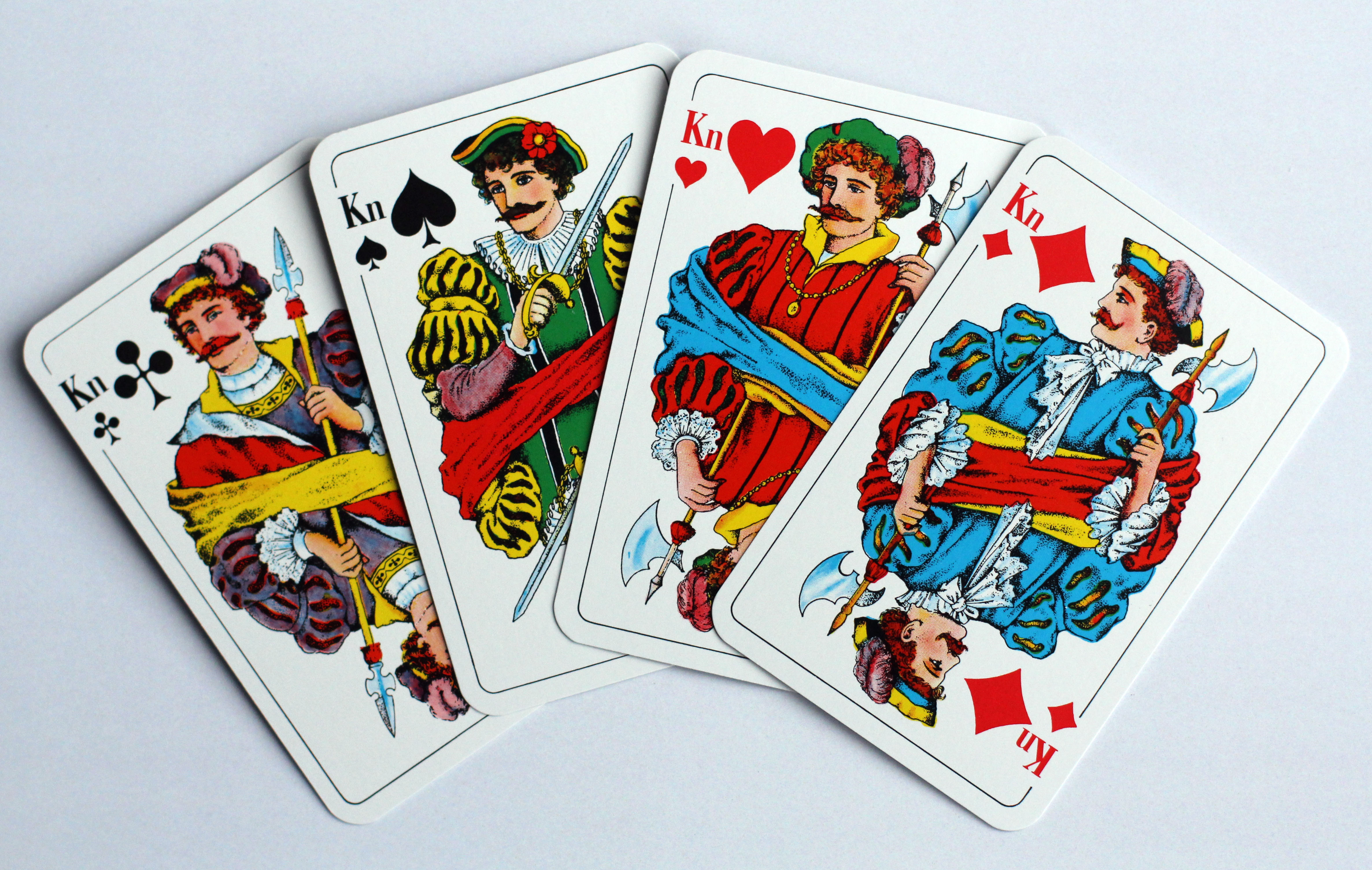
- The four Knights
- Type: Trick-taking
- Players: 2 or more
- Cards: 36 (2-3 players) or 52 (4 or more)
- Deck: French-suited, Modern Swedish
- Rank (high→low): Trumps: ♣J ♠J ♥J ♦J A K Q 10 9 8 7 6 Plain suits: A K Q 10 9 8 7 6
- Play: clockwise

Related games
- Rams, Ramsen, Rödskägg
- Features: pot, 5 cards, dropping out, exchanging, points count down

Knektpass or Knekt-Pass, also called Rams, is an old Swedish card game of the Rams group, mentioned as early as 1834. It is a trick-taking game for two or more players and features the four Jacks as top trumps.

== Name ==
The name Knektpass literally means "Knight Pass" and clearly refers to the four 'Knights' which have been promoted to top trumps, a feature that does not appear in any other variants of Rams. The word pass can mean pass in the sense of a permit or a mountain pass and probably refers to the privilege of the Knights in being able to pass unscathed through a trick, unable to be beaten by the other lesser cards.

== Cards ==
A 36-card pack of the French-suited, 'Modern Swedish' pattern is used. The honours or permanent trumps are the four 'knights' ranked in order: ♣J ♠J ♥J ♦J. They are followed by the cards of the trump suit from Ace down to Six, with the exception of the Jack. The plain suits rank in their natural order: A > K > Q > 10 > 9 > 8 > 7 > 6. If more than three play, a 52-card pack is used.

== Rules ==
The following rules are based on those in the Ny och fullständig svensk spelbok of 1847.

=== Preliminaries ===
Players start the game with an agreed number of points each, typically 12, which is chalked on a slate or pencilled on a scoresheet. The aim of the game is to be the first player to reach 0 points by taking tricks. Each trick won earns a one-point deduction from the starting total of 12 points.

=== Deal and exchange ===
At the start of the game, players cut for the deal; the player with the lowest card deals, shuffles the pack, offers it to his right for cutting and then deals 5 cards each to the left in packets of 2 and then 3, before turning the next card for trump. Thereafter, the deal rotates to the left.

The dealer may exchange with the trump turnup. Forehand (left of the dealer) then announces whether he will play or pass (i.e. drop out of the current deal), followed by the other players in clockwise order. In the same order, those who elect to play may then discard any number of hand cards in return for the same number of cards from the talon. There may be up to three rounds of exchanging. If all pass, the cards are redealt. If only one plays, he wins immediately and deducts 5 points from his score; the others keeping their current scores.

=== Play ===
At least 2 players must elect to play for the deal to proceed. The player in forehand leads. Players must follow suit and overtake if possible.

=== Scoring ===
A player must take at least as many tricks as they exchanged cards. If they succeed, they deduct 1 point per trick taken. If they fail, they add 5 points multiplied by the number of tricks they fell short of the minimum. For example, if a player exchanges 2 cards and takes 2 tricks, they deduct 2 points. If they only take one trick, they add 5 points; if they take no tricks, they add 10 points to their score. The first player to reach 0 points is the winner.

== Bibliography ==
- Glimne, Dan (2016). Kortspelshandboken (3rd rev. ed.). Stockholm: Känguru. ISBN 978-91-7663-115-7.
- Glimne, Dan (2006). Lilla kortspelshandboken. Stockholm: Känguru. ISBN 91-85476-32-3.
