= Tussenhausen =

- Municipality
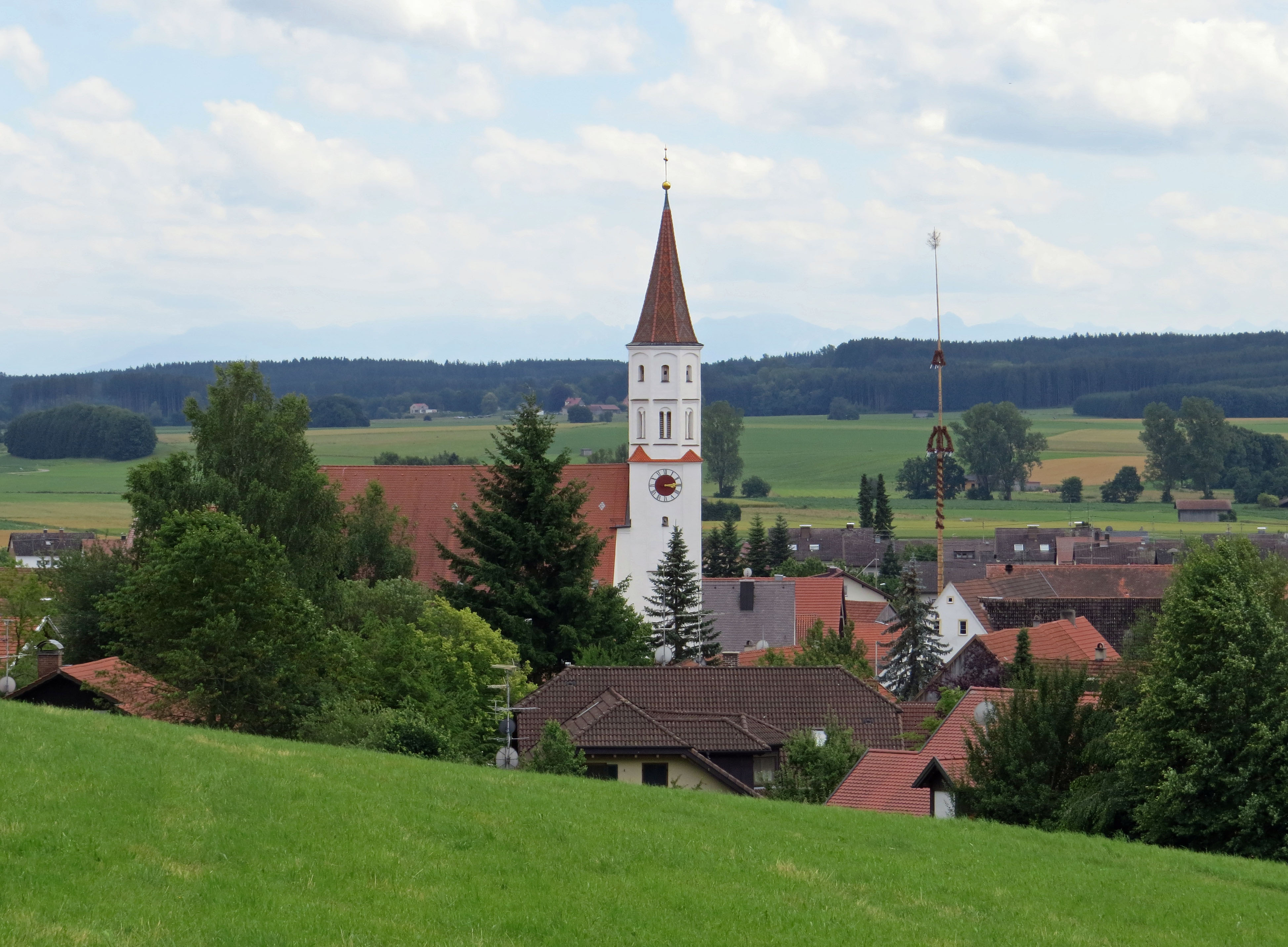
- Tussenhausen seen from the north

- Coat of arms

- Location of Tussenhausen within Unterallgäu district
- Interactive map of Tussenhausen
- Location within Germany Location within Bavaria
- Coordinates: 48°6′N 10°34′E
- Country: Germany
- State: Bavaria
- Admin. region: Schwaben
- District: Unterallgäu

Government
  - Mayor (2020–26): Johannes Ruf

Area
  - Total: 41.79 km^{2} (16.14 sq mi)
- Elevation: 575 m (1,886 ft)

Population (2025-12-31)
  - Total: 3,040
  - Density: 72.7/km^{2} (188/sq mi)
- Time zone: UTC+01:00 (CET)
  - Summer (DST): UTC+02:00 (CEST)
- Postal codes: 86874
- Dialling codes: 08268
- Vehicle registration: MN
- Website: www.tussenhausen.de

Tussenhausen is a municipality in the district of Unterallgäu in Bavaria, Germany.
