= Ramsen (card game) =

Bavarian card game

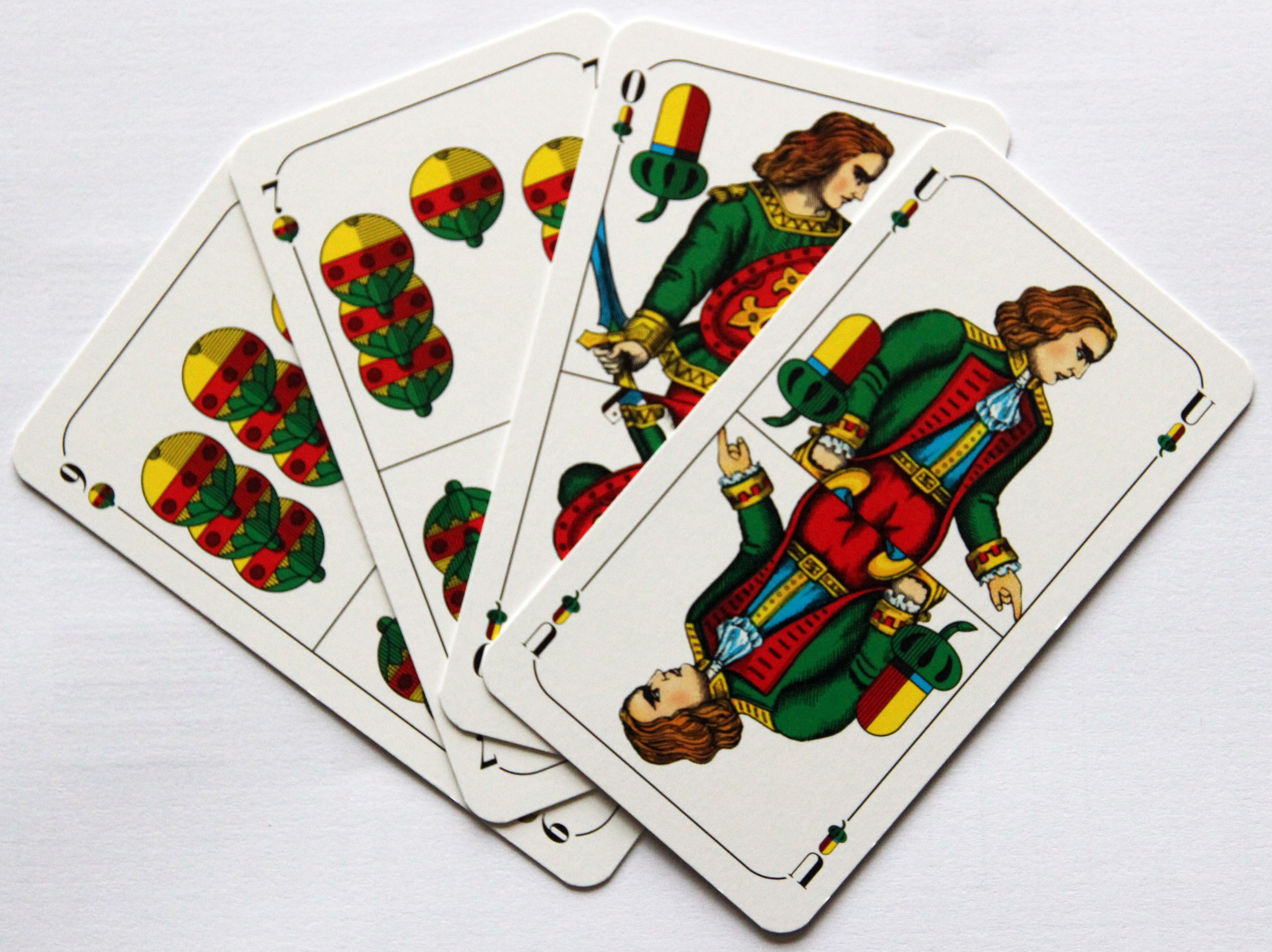
- The permanent trumps: Dallmutz, Belli, Großer Bube and Kleiner Bube
- Origin: Germany
- Type: Plain-trick
- Family: Rams group
- Players: 3–5
- Age range: 8+
- Cards: 32
- Deck: Bavarian-pattern pack
- Rank (high→low): A K O U 10 9 8 7
- Play: Clockwise

Related games
- Loo • Knektpass • Rams • Ramscheln; Lampeln • Mulatschak • Schnalzen • Schnellen
- Features: 5 cards, 4 special trumps and exchanging, game is 10 points

Ramsen or Ramsch is a traditional Bavarian plain-trick, card game for three to five players that is played with a 32-card German-suited pack and is suitable both for adults and for children. (Note: Ramsen happens to be Bavarian for "scoop", "pick up" or "gather", but probably just means "playing Rams".) It is one of the Rams group of card games that are distinguished by allowing players to drop out if they think they will fail to win the required number of tricks. An unusual feature of Ramsen is the presence of four permanent trump cards that rank just below the Trump Sow (Ace). It should not be confused with the contract of Ramsch in games like Skat or Schafkopf, nor with the related game of Rams which is also called Ramsenin Austria, but is played with a Piquet pack, does not have permanent trumps and has a different card ranking.

== History ==
Ramsen appears to be over 200 years old, there being a reference to this "rural game" being played around 1800 in Bavaria. In an 1844 south German anthology, it is one of the card games that is "fun" and in which "one does not have to think too much". In 1877, the game is described as one of several which is "popular with ordinary folk" in Bavaria.

The earliest mention of a matador in any game of the Rams family is in 1862 when the Seven of Bells (Belle) is recorded as the highest card after the trump Deuce.

The village of Zaisertshofen has held 'world championships' in Ramsch, a variant of Ramsen, since at least 1990. There are usually two per year, at Christmas and Easter.

Ramsen is still taught and played in Bavaria today, for example, in Memmingen and Markt Rettenbach. It is also recorded as being played in the Austrian states of Vorarlberg, Tyrol, Lower Austria, Carinthia and Burgenland in recent times. It is described by Sirch as being suitable for adults and children alike.

== Overview and aim ==
Ramsen is one of the Rams family of card games, the distinguishing feature of which is that players may choose to drop out of the current game if they think they will be unable to win any tricks or a minimum number of tricks.

Ramsen is a plain-trick game in which the aim is to win as many tricks as possible and be the first to complete the two crosses used for scoring. It may also be played for small stakes.

== Cards ==
Ramsen is played with a 32-card, Bavarian pattern, German-suited pack with the suits of Acorns, Leaves or Grass, Hearts and Bells.

Suits of the Bavarian pattern pack
Acorns (Eichel)	Leaves (Grün/Gras)	Hearts (Herz)	Bells (Schellen)
Acorn symbol of Bavarian playing cards	Leaves symbol of Bavarian playing cards	Hearts symbol of Bavarian playing cards	Bells symbol of Bavarian playing cards

The ranking order of the cards within the plain suits is: Sow > King > Ober > Unter > 10 > 9 > 8 > 7. An unusual feature of Ramsen is the presence of four permanent trump cards that rank just below the Trump Sow:

- 9 – the 9 of Bells or Dallmutz
- 7 – the 7 of Bells or Belli
- O – the Ober of Acorns or Großer Bube ("Big Boy" or "Big Jack")
- U – the Unter of Acorns or Kleiner Bube ("Little Boy" or "Little Jack").

Thus the ranking order of the trump suit (T = trump, A = Sow, etc.) is: TA > 9 > 7 > O > U > TK > TO > TU > T10 > T9 > T8 > T7.

Permanent trumps
9 7 O U
Additional variable trump suits
Acorns	Leaves	Hearts	Bells
A K 10 9 8 7	A K O U 10 9 8 7	A K O U 10 9 8 7	A K O U 10 8

== Playing ==
=== Dealing and trumps ===
The dealer shuffles the pack and rearhand cuts. Rearhand may keep (schleck, literally "lap up") the bottom card of the top stack, but will then only be dealt four cards. Otherwise players are dealt five cards as one packet of three and one packet of two. The next card is flipped to determine the trump suit and the remainder placed face down next to it as the talon.

=== Exchanging ===
Each player, in clockwise order beginning with forehand, may now exchange cards from the hand for cards in the talon. In addition, the dealer may exchange with the trump upcard. A maximum of five cards may be exchanged in total. In other words, if forehand exchanges three, the next player may only exchange two. If the next one does so, no more exchanging may take place. If rearhand has schleckt when cutting the pack, the player may not exchange.

=== Bidding ===
Players now review their cards and, in turn, opt whether to "play" or "pass". A player who has exchanged must play. The reason a player may want to pass (= fold – and therefore not participate in the current deal – is that taking no tricks is penalised by having to complete an additional cross (i.e. by taking an extra five tricks) in order to win the game.

=== Trick playing ===
Forehand leads to the first trick or, if forehand has folded, players play in order of positional seniority, beginning with forehand. Players must follow suit (Farbzwang), must play a trump if unable to follow suit (Trumpfzwang) and, in doing either, must head the trick if possible (Stechzwang). A player who cannot follow suit or trump may throw in any card.

== Scoring ==
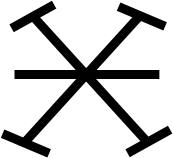
A completed scoring cross

Before the game, two crosses (X X) are drawn for each player. For every trick won, a bar is drawn at the end of one of the arms of the crosses; for the fifth trick a bar is drawn horizontally across the middle of the cross (see diagram right). The first player to complete 2 crosses is the winner. A player who takes no tricks gets an extra cross to complete.

== Zaisertshofen variant ==
The village of Zaisertshofen in the Upper Swabian county of Unterallgäu hosts biannual 'world championships' in a variant of Ramsen called Ramsch (not to be confused with the games of Ramsch or Ramscheln). The key differences are:

Cards

The four permanent trumps are not individually named, but are collectively called Criticals (Kritischer) or Greeks (Griechen).

Bidding

Bidding takes place before exchanging.

Schlecking

- Before the pack is cut, the dealer must ensure the bottom card is not a Critical; if the cutter discovers it is, the dealer incurs 2 penalty points (2 extra lines on the slate).
- After cutting, the cutter may schleck a Critical from the bottom of the pack. Any player may challenge this; if it is a Critical, the challenger gets a 2-point penalty and must play that game; if the challenge is successful, the cutter gets 2 penalty points. The cutter may schleck up to 5 cards in this way.
- In addition to exchanging with the trump upcard, the dealer may schleck a Critical from the top of the stock provided it is shown to the others. The dealer may schleck further Criticals this way.

Scoring

- For each player, 7 lines are chalked up on a slate and one is erased for each trick taken.
- A player who plays but takes no tricks 'goes Ramsch' gets 2 more penalty points (= lines).
- The game has a loser not a winner, the aim being to avoid being the last one 'out'.
- A player who erases his or her last line 'goes out' but must announce this before picking up the trick, on penalty of losing the game. Saying "out" too soon costs 2 penalty points.
- The last player out is the loser and scores a penalty Bolle (blob) marked on the slate.

== Kritzen ==
Kritzen or Kritzeln appears in older literature as the name of a card game. Staub & Tobler (1895) state that it is a "card game with 5 cards (apiece), similar to Ramsen." Stalder says it is "a game with cards in which you chalk a number of lines on the table and erase as many lines as you win tricks." See also Chratze and Kratzen.

== Literature ==
- "Rammes". Freiberger Biercomment. Freiberg: J.G. Engelhardt. 1862. p. 19ff.
- Geiser, Remigius (2004). "100 Kartenspiele des Landes Salzburg" (PDF). Talon. 13. Archived from the original (PDF) on 27 August 2018.
- Griesinger, Carl Theodor (1844). Carl Theodor Griesinger's sämmtliche belletristische Schriften: Skizzenbuch. Carl Theodor Griesinger's sämmtliche belletristische Schriften: Skizzenbuch (in German). Stuttgart: Griesinger.
- Korn, Karl (1858). Adolph und Walburg: oder die Tannenmühle eine Erzählung aus dem Anfange dieses Jahrhunderts. Augsburg, Bavaria: Lampart.
- Schmeller, Johann Andreas; Frommann, G.C.; Mausser, O.; Basler, O. (1877). Bayerisches Wörterbuch: R - Z (in German). Oldenbourg. ISBN 978-3-511-06100-5.
- Sirch, Walter (2008). Vom Alten zum Zwanzger – Bayerische Kartenspiele für Kinder und Erwachsene – neu entdeckt. Bayerischer Trachtenverband, Traunstein.
- Stalder, Franz Joseph (1818). Versuch eines Schweizerischen Idiotikon, mit etymologischen Bemerkungen untermischt, Volume 2. Aarau: Heinrich Remigius Sauerländer.
- Staub, Friedrich and Ludwig Tobler (1895). Schweizerisches Idiotikon. Vol. 3. Frauenfeld: J. Huber.
