= Officers' Skat =

Card game and Skat variant

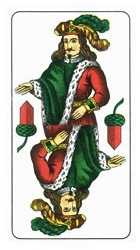
- The top trump: the Unter of Acorns
- Origin: Germany
- Type: Point-trick
- Players: 2
- Cards: 32
- Deck: German or French
- Rank (high→low): (U) D 10 K O 9 8 7 D K O U 10 9 8 7 (Null)
- Play: Alternate
- Playing time: 7-8 minutes/hand

Related games
- Skat • Oma Skat • Bierskat

Officers' Skat (Offiziersskat), is a trick-taking card game for two players which is based on the rules of Skat. It may be played with a German or French pack of 32 cards which, from the outset of the game, are laid out in rows both face down and face up. As in Skat, tricks are taken and card points counted to determine the winner of a round; game points are then awarded to decide the winner of a game. There are several local variations of the game, which differ mainly in the number of cards revealed or hidden and the calculation of points.

== Name ==
Officers' Skat is also called Two-hand Skat (Zweimann-Skat or Skat zu zweit), Sailors' Skat (Seemannsskat), Farmers' Skat (Bauernskat), Robbers' Skat (Räuberskat) or Coachmen's Skat (Kutscherskat)

According to Grupp (1975), the name Officers' Skat (Offiziers-Skat ) came from the fact that "officers only socialised with the men when they were in the barracks, but not at the skat table, so often there was no third man." As a result, a variation of skat for two players was derived.

The name Coachman's Skat (Kutscherskat) comes from the fact that coachmen were supposed to have whiled away their waiting time with this game, while their gentlemen went off to a social event, there being often 2 coachmen (including the postilion) per coach. The cards were laid out between the coaches on the coach box.

== Rules ==
=== Overview ===
The game is played between two players, each of whom has two rows of cards placed face down and two rows of cards placed face up on top of them. Thus each player has his 16 cards laid out in two rows of cards facing him, each row containing four pairs of cards, the top cards being face up. The players then play for 16 tricks. Players may agree to play with a trump suit (the game is then known as Suit; German: Farbenspiel), without a trump suit (Grand) or without any trumps at all (Ramsch). A Null game (Nullspiel), as in normal Skat, may be also possible depending on the rules.

=== Deal ===
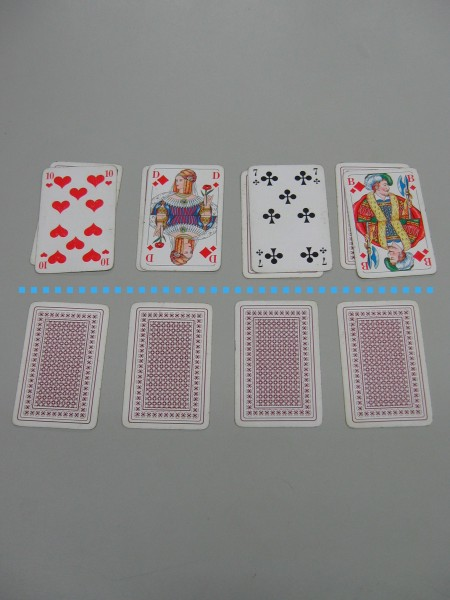
During dealing: The opponent of the dealer, the 'declarer' (top), chooses the trump suit

The dealer shuffles the cards and his opponent – the forehand (Vorhand), elder hand (Ältere) or declarer (Ansager) – cuts them. The dealer then deals a row of four cards, face down, to the forehand and four to himself. Next, the forehand is given four cards face up on top of his first row of face down cards. Now forehand chooses a suit (Bells, Hearts, Leaves or Acorns) as the trump suit.

After the trump suit has been declared, the dealer deals four cards to himself, face up, on top of his first row. He may double the stakes by saying "Kontra!" if he believes his opponent cannot win. The remaining 16 cards are then dealt; four face down to each player making a second row and then four face up to each player on top of them. (see variations). If the dealer has said "kontra" after receiving his first four face-up cards, the forehand can answer "Re!" after receiving his second row of face-up cards thus re-doubling the stakes and indicating that he thinks he will win the game.

=== Trumps ===
As in Skat, one of the four suits is nominated as the trump suit in addition to the jacks (French card pack) or Unters (German card pack). Alternatively the players can play Grand and only use the jacks/Unters as trumps. As in Suit in Skat, the four jacks/Unters are the highest trumps in the order: Clubs/Acorns, Spades/Leaves, Hearts and Diamonds/Bells. Then follow the Ace/Deuce, 10, King, Queen/Ober, 9, 8 and 7 of the chosen trump suit.

The trump suit sets the game value at 24 (Grand), 12 (acorns), 11 (leaves), 10 (hearts) or 9 (bells) points. There is also the option to choose Ramsch i.e. the winner is the player with the fewest points.

Cards in the trump suit are ordered as follows:

1. Jack of Clubs / Unter of Acorns, J♣ or B♣ or U (German: Eichel Unter)
2. Jack of Spades / Unter of Leaves, J♠ or B♠ or U (German: Grüner Unter)
3. Jack of Hearts / Unter of Hearts, J♥ or B♥ or U (German: Roter Unter)
4. Jack of Diamonds / Unter of Bells, J♦ or B♦ or U (German: Schellen Unter)
5. Trump Ace / Deuce (As / Daus)
6. Trump Ten
7. Trump King (König)
8. Trump Queen / Ober
9. Trump Nine
10. Trump Eight
11. Trump Seven

The Jack of Clubs/Unter of Acorns is the highest-ranking card in a Suit game and is called in German der Alte ("the old man").

The non-trump suit cards are ranked A-10-K-Q-9-8-7 (or A-10-K-O-9-8-7 for the German pack respectively).

=== Play ===
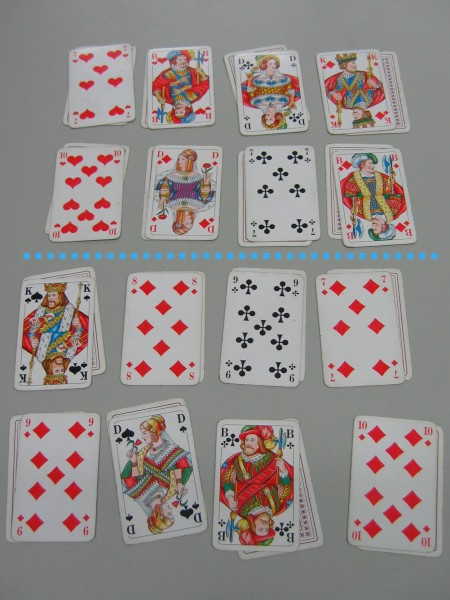
A starting situation in Officers' Skat

The player who has chosen trumps, the declarer, starts the game by leading to the first trick with one of his face-up cards. The player going second must 'follow suit' if possible. If a player is unable to follow suit, i.e. he is 'skat' or 'blank', he can throw down a card (give up a card of his choice) or in the case of having no cards of the same suit left, he may trump it (play a trump and win the card). The rules are the same as those for Suit, Grand and Ramsch in Skat.

After each trick, any exposed face down cards are flipped. The winner of the trick leads to the next trick.

=== Counting and scoring ===
The game ends when all 16 tricks have been taken; then both players add up their 'card points' from the cards they have won. The game is won by the player who has amassed the most card points. Because the total value of all the cards is 120 card points, a winning score is 61 or more card points. The cards have the same values as in Skat: 11, 10, 4, 3 and 2 points (Ace, 10, King, Ober, Unter), the cards 7, 8 and 9 do not count. If both players score 60 card points, then the player who did not choose trumps is the winner.

The declarer receives 'game points' according to his win or loss. These are calculated as in normal Skat. First the number of matadors (Spitzen) is calculated. This is the either the number of Jacks or Unters held in unbroken sequence, beginning with the Jack of Clubs or Unter of Acorns or, alternatively, the number not held in unbroken sequence. The number of matadors plus one is then multiplied by the base value of the trump suit (Bells: 9, Hearts: 10, Leaves: 11, Acorns: 12 or Grand: 24). For example, if Bells are trumps and the declarer holds the Unters of Acorns, Leaves and Hearts, but not Bells, his score is (3+1) x 9 = 36. If his opponent has won less than 30 card points (i.e. he is "in the Schneider") or even no card points at all (i.e. he is "black" or "Schwarz"), the declarer doubles or quadruples his game points accordingly (Schneider: double; Schwarz: four times). If the declarer loses, he deducts twice the number of game points he would have won.

Note that, as in Skat, game points are quite separate from card points; card points determine whether the declarer wins or loses, whereas game points determine how much is won or lost.

Many people calculate the points using additional matadors (Spitzen) as in Skat, so that in a game with all four Jacks and the Ace of trumps, the winner gets 5 matador points for a game value of 6 times the base value. The same goes for the calculation of Unters or Jacks not held.

In addition there are also simplified forms of scoring:

- The winner of a game scores the base value in points, doubled for Schneider, irrespective of the matadors.
- The winner of a game gets the number of card points achieved.
- The winner of a game gets 2 points. If Schneider or Schwarz occurs, then the winner gets 3 or 4 points respectively. If the result is a draw, each player gets 1 point.

== Variations ==
=== Passing ===
If agreed, a game can also be played where players can 'pass' instead of choosing trumps. If the actual declarer passes, the dealer can choose trumps once both players have four cards, face up, before them. If both players pass, the game is played as Ramsch, i.e. the aim is to get the lowest score.

=== Harlequin Skat ===
The feature of Harlequin Skat is the fact that a player only sees half his own cards, but also half of his opponent's. His opponent cannot see any of those cards, but can see all the others.

The advantages of harlequin skat are that you need less space to play it, and a greater tactical depth because you know your opponent's cards before they are seen.

The same rules apply as in Officers' Skat. However, the cards are not distributed on the table, but held in the hand as follows:

The cards are placed in a pile in the middle. Players now take turns drawing one card at a time. The first card is picked up normally. The second card is not viewed, but placed behind the other, so that it is only visible by the opponent. The third card is then picked up 'normally' again, the fourth is placed facing away behind the third, and so on. Players may say: "One to see, one to turn!" to help them remember this. The players pick up their first eight cards, of which they will hold four face up, normally; and the remaining four turned to face away and so only seen by their opponent. The starting player now calls trumps. Then the remaining cards are drawn in the same fashion, so that now both players see eight of their own cards and eight of their opponent's. When a card is played, the card facing the opponent may then be turned over.

In addition, after each player has received eight cards (four face down, four open), the rest may be dealt as in a normal hand (face up to the player); this is called a 'half-open' (halb-offenes) game.

=== Admirals' Skat ===
In Admirals' Skat, each player is given five cards face down, five face up and five in their hand. The remaining two cards are set aside as the skat or 'stock' (Stock). The trump suit and who plays first is then determined as usual in Skat with bidding. This variant is also called "with bidding" (mit Reizen).

== See also ==
- Officers' Schafkopf

== Literature ==
- Hugo Kastner, Gerald Kador Folkvord: Die große Humboldtenzyklopädie der Kartenspiele. Humboldt, Baden-Baden 2005, p. 196, ISBN 3-89994-058-X (skat&f=false Google Books)
- Offiziers-Skat In: Claus D. Grupp: Kartenspiele. Falken-Verlag Erich Sicker, Wiesbaden 1975; pp. 72–73. ISBN 3-8068-2001-5.
- "Offiziersskat" In: Erhard Gorys: Das Buch der Spiele. Manfred Pawlak Verlagsgesellschaft, Herrsching o.J.; p. 45.
