= Bierlachs =

Card game variant

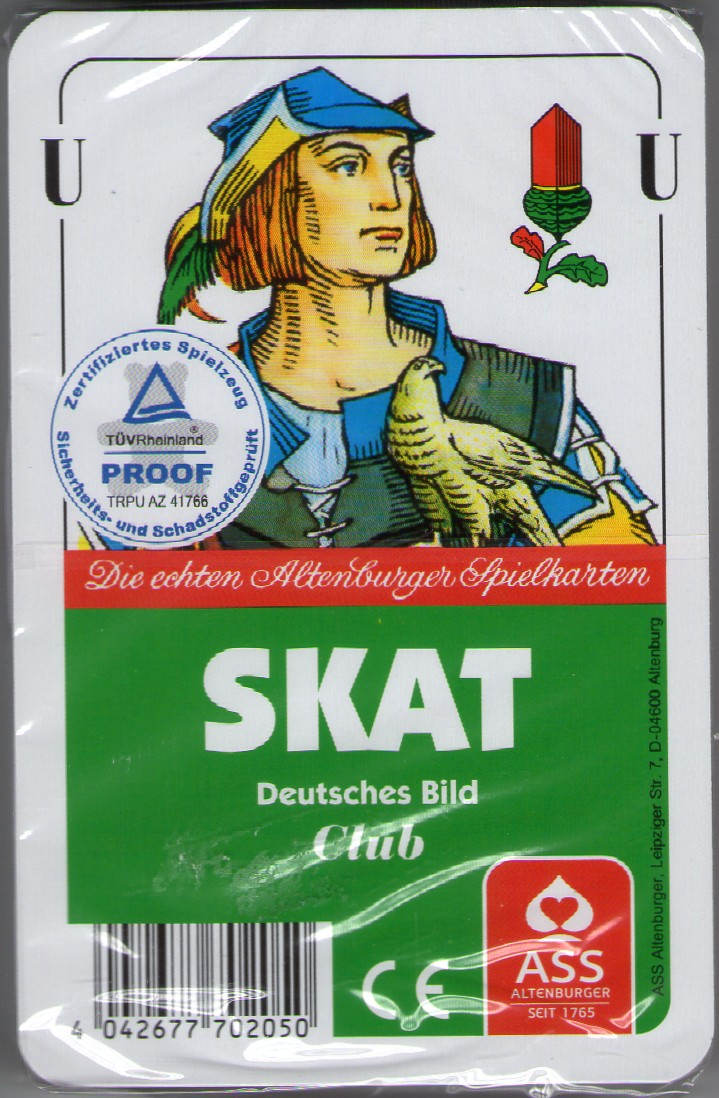
- A typical Skat pack (German-suited cards)
- Origin: Germany
- Alternative names: Bierlatz, Beer Skat
- Type: Point-trick
- Players: 3
- Skills: Hand evaluation, counting, cooperation
- Cards: 32
- Deck: French or German-suited "Skat" pack
- Rank (high→low): (U/J) A 10 K O/Q 9 8 7
- Play: Clockwise
- Playing time: 3–5 minutes per hand played
- Chance: Low

Related games
- Skat • Oma Skat • Officers' Skat

Bierlachs, also Bierskat, Bierscat, Lachs or Beer Skat, is a variant of Germany's national card game, Skat, in which the winner is the first to score a fixed number of points. It is predominantly played for beer in pubs and restaurants.

== Name ==
The name is a corruption of Bierlatz; latzen is colloquial German for "paying" e.g. a fine and alludes to the fact that the loser pays for a round of beer.

== History ==
The game is recorded as Bierlachs or Lachs as early as 1862 where, depending on the beverage being played for, it was also referred to as Weinlachs ("Wine Round") or Kaffeelachs ("Coffee Round").

== Rules ==
The following rules are based on Lehnhoff except where stated.

Bierlachs follows the general rules for Skat, except in terms of scoring and winning. A target score is set and only minus scores are reckoned. In other words, if the declarer wins a deal worth 40 points, the two opponents score the minus 40 points each. The declarer is penalised double (as in Skat) for losing such a game and scores minus 80 points.

The game is played until one of the players reaches the (minus) target; that player is the loser and pays for a round of beer, hence the name "Bierlachs". Sometimes a fixed payment is made to the Skatkasse, also called the Pinke, i.e. Skat pot.

Game is typically 501 points.

== Tactics ==
A player nearing the target score is forced to try to win the auction in order not to collect any more minus points. This often leads to a willingness to take ever more risk, sometimes resulting in desperate games being played. However, a player in the danger zone will also find that their opponents are increasingly risk-averse and reluctant to bid. This may present a chance to draw an opponent into the danger zone as well. But if an opponent wins, the endangered player is likely to be pushed over the limit and thus lose the game. As Lehnhoff suggests, such a game is not without its appeal and it can be exciting to see someone in the danger zone snatch victory from the jaws of defeat or a relief to survive and see one's "Skat brother go for a swim". There is usually a moral obligation to play another game to allow the loser to enjoy a free beer. When a Bierlachs session ends is a matter for agreement but, typically, when one or more players decide they need to go, they will announce the last three deals. These are usually played as Bock rounds, in which the game value doubles, giving the player who is losing a chance to catch up.

== Scoring and settlement ==
Games may also be played for 301 or 401 points. It is common to add the date of the month to the target, for example:

- 300 + date: on the 19th of the month, the target score would be 319.
- 500 + date: on the 11th of the month, the target would be 511 points.
- 300 + player's age: if the player is 33, the target would be 333 points.

Although the normal penalty is a round of beer for the 3 or 4 players, sometimes it is agreed that the loser buys lunch or supper.

- 3 Bock - 3 Ramsch: three Bock hands then three Ramsch hands are played alternately (for four-hand games, obviously 4 x Bock and 4 x Ramsch).
- Bock as special game if: the result is 60:60 or game value is over 120 points

== See also ==
- Glossary of Skat terms

== Literature ==
- Freiberger Bier-Comment. Leipzig: Engelhardt. 1862.
- Goren, Charles (1950). Goren's Hoyle Encyclopedia of Games. NY: Greystone.
- Lehnhoff, Karl (1995). Das Skatspiel. Eine Einführung (= Falken TaschenBuch 60151). Falken Taschenbuch-Verlag, Niedernhausen/Ts., ISBN 3-635-60151-9 (several editions).
- Lehnhoff, Karl (2011). Skat : Regeln und Tipps Für Anfänger und Fortgeschrittene Mit Skat-Lexikon (18th, updated ed.). Hannover: Humboldt. ISBN 978-3-86910-178-1.
- Rousselle, Hans-Peter (2015). Das Skatspiel in Theorie und Praxis. Norderstedt: BoD. p. 31. ISBN 978-3-73573-969-8.
- Rulemann, Theodor (1909). Das große illustrierte Spielbuch. Berlin: Merkur.
