= Rams (card game) =

European trick-taking card game

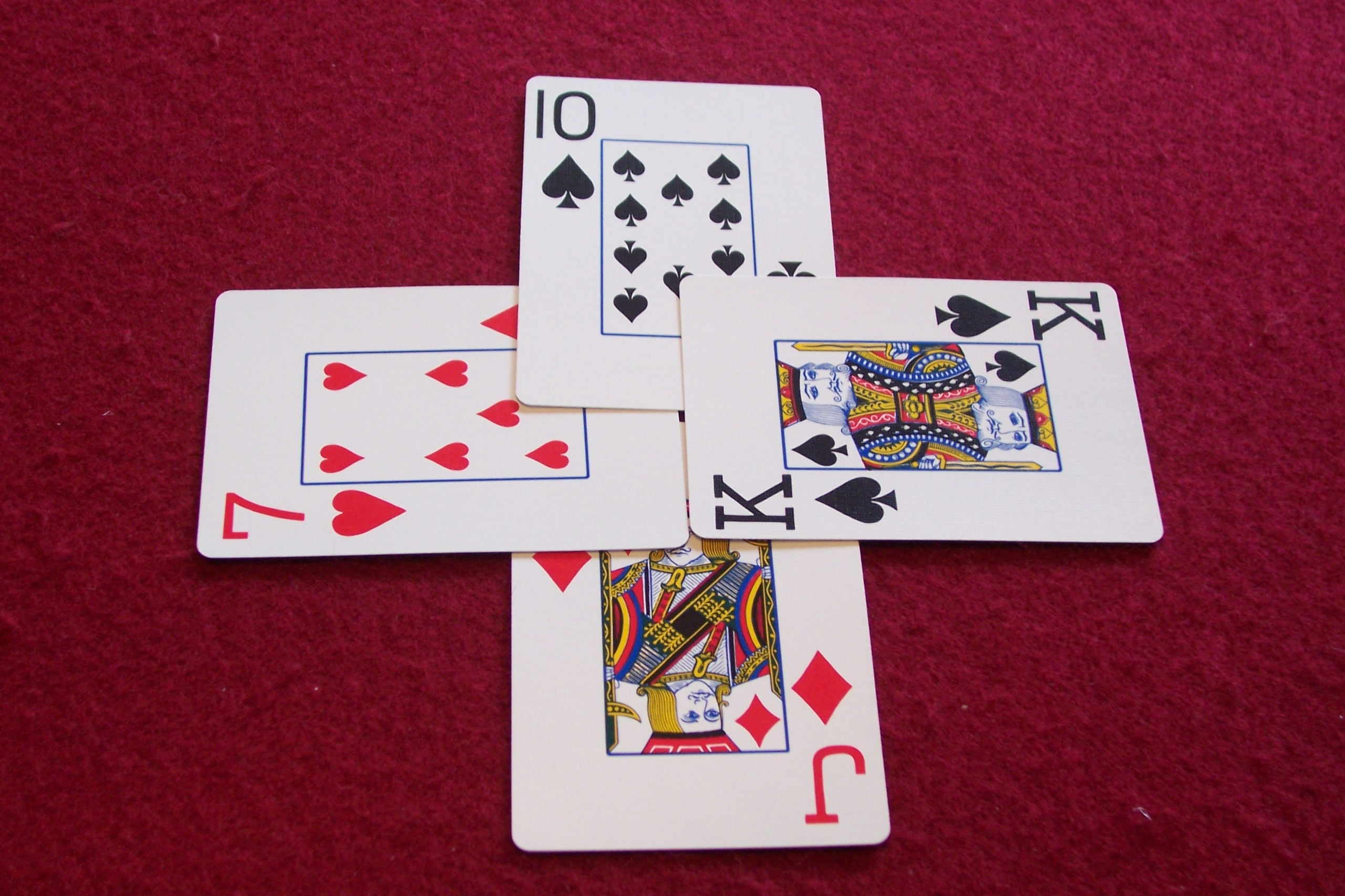
- Origin: France
- Alternative names: Ramsch, Rammes, Rems, Rounce
- Type: Plain-trick
- Family: Rams group
- Players: 3-6
- Cards: 32 cards
- Deck: French or German
- Play: Clockwise
- Playing time: 15 min.
- Chance: Medium

Related games
- Knektpass • Loo • Ramscheln • Ramsen
- Basic features: 5 cards, no exchanging, no special trumps, folding allowed, game is 5, 7 or 10 points

Rams is a European trick-taking card game related to Nap and Loo, and may be played by any number of persons not exceeding nine, although five or seven make a good game. In Belgium and France, the game of Rams is also spelt Rammes or Rems, in Germany, Rams, Rammes, Ramsch, Ramschen, Ramscheln or Ramsen, in Austria, Ramsen and Ramschen, and, in America, Rounce. The basic idea is fairly constant, but scoring systems vary. It was a widespread European gambling and drinking game that is still popular today. During the 19th century, it was introduced as Rounce in America and played with a 52-card deck without any difference between simples and doubles and with no General Rounce announcement. In the modern German variety of the game, Ramscheln, the 7♦ is the second best trump ranking next below the ace.

== History ==
Parlett describes Rams as a "nineteenth-century French, Alsatian and Belgian" pastime, representative of a "very loose-knit group of gambling and drinking games". In fact, although its rules were first published in France around 1820, (Note: Bossuet lists a manual published between 1816 and 1820 which includes the rules of Rams.) there are also Austrian sources banning the game of "Leveferln or Ramschen" as early as 1826 and a Bavarian account of the "rural game" of Ramsen being played around 1800. By the 1830s it had reached Sweden and, in 1847, the Swedish variant had already been enhanced by the promotion of the four 'Knights' (Jacks) to become permanent top trumps, hence the game was also known as Knektpass. By the 1850s the game, based on a Piquet pack and using Écarté ranking, was established in France and was just coming into vogue in Paris. Meanwhile identical rules for German-suited cards were being published in Leipzig and, by 1868, the game had reached America where Hoyle's described the American game of Rounce as a 52-card variant derived from the German game of Ramsch.

In 1862, the Freiberger Biercomment, a book by students about how they should conduct themselves in pubs and bars, included the rules of drinking games, including Rammes. These rules were more elaborate and introduced the 7 of Bells, or Belle (pronounced "Beller"; the equivalent of the 7♦ in a French pack), as the 2nd highest trump and a widow known as the 'blind' (Blinde). A bonus was awarded for capturing the Belle and there were rules about the protocol for leaving the game temporarily, for viewing the bottom card of the cut, for various infractions and a more complex scoring system.

The American variant, Rounce, which we are told is "derived from the German game of Ramsch" is first recorded in 1868, played with a 32-card pack and featuring the blind, known here as a 'dumby'. In Foster's Complete Hoyle of 1897, a Rams variant appears under the name 'Bierspiel', "a popular form of Rams among German students." In fact it is none other than Rammes, the game recorded over 30 years earlier in the Biercomment, the name apparently the result of a mistranslation, since Bierspiel is simply German for "drinking game." The error persists to the present day, Bierspiel being recorded as recently as 2008 in an English games compendium. It's more authentic modern equivalent is Ramscheln.

It was not long before some of these rules became more widely adopted by Rams players. In 1859, rules published in Paris included the option of a mort, the equivalent of the blind, with which forehand had the right to exchange his hand; if he chose not to, the next player in turn had the option and so on. And in Alsace, where Rams was one of the six most popular games in 1883, the first deal was a force in which all players had to play. In subsequent deals, players could 'pass' and drop out, and there was a blind with which players could exchange their hands.

But the game was already on the wane in central Europe; for example, in 1904 it is reported as being "formerly popular" in the whole of the Austrian state of Vorarlberg.

== Overview ==
Each player starts with five, seven or ten counters, and the general principle is to lose counters by winning tricks. Each player goes out as he plays his last counter, and the last left in is the overall loser. Alternatively, the first to run out of counters is the overall winner. By another method, the dealer puts five counters in the pool and each player takes a counter for each trick won, or adds five for taking none.

The 32 cards rank A K Q J 10 9 8 7 in each suit. A first dealer is selected at random and the turn to deal and play passes to the left. Each player is dealt 5 cards each, in batches of 3 and 2, including an extra hand or "widow" face down. The next card is turned up for trump. Anyone who thinks he can win all five tricks immediately announces "General Rams" and no one may then drop out. Otherwise, each player in turn from dealer's left announces whether he will pass, throwing the hand without penalty, or play, thereby undertaking to win at least one trick. Another option is to throw the hand in and take the widow in its place. Only the first player to bid may do so.

There must be at least two active players. If all fold up to the player at dealer's right, both he and the player must play. So, the dealer may not fold if only one previous player has undertaken to play the game.

== Play ==
Before play, dealer may take the trump turn-up and throw out any unwanted card face down. The opening lead is made by the player at dealer's left, unless anyone declared a General Rams, in which case the declarer leads. Subsequent players must follow suit and head the trick if possible and if unable to do so, they must play a trump and beat any trump already played so far. The trick is taken by the highest card of the suit led or by the highest trump if any are played. The winner of each trick then leads to the next.

Each player removes a counter for each trick taken. Anyone who played but failed to win a trick is saddled with five more. The declarer of a General Rams loses five counters if successful, and everyone takes five more. If unsuccessful, the declarer takes five more, the others drop one counter for each trick they had won, and a player who took none is exempt from penalty.

== See also ==
- Bourré
- Euchre
- Ramscheln
- Ramsen

== Literature ==
- Sammlung der politischen Gesetze und Verordnungen für das Erzherzogthum Oesterreich ob der Enns und das Herzogthum Salzburg. Vol. 8. Linz: Quandt. 1826. Contains acts passed from 1 Jan to 31 Dec 1826.
- Ny och fullständig svensk spelbok: eller Grundlig Anvisning Till Alla Nu Brukliga Kortspel [New and Complete Swedish Games Book: or Thorough Instructions for All Currently Playable Card Games]. Gothenburg: D. F. Bonniers. 1847.
- Freiberger Biercomment. Freiberg: J.G. Engelhardt. 1862.
- Schriften. Vol. 2. Vienna: Literarischer Verein in Wien. 1904.
- Bolton, Lesley (2005). The Everything Games Book: 600 Classic Games and Activities for the Whole Family. Adams Media. ISBN 1-59337-318-X.
- Bossuet, Jacque-Bénigne (1846). Oeuvres de Bossuet. Paris. Reprint of 1816-1820 edition. Mentions Rams among list of games in a manual by Bossuet – Manuel des jeux d’Impériale, Triomphe, Mouche, Ambigu, Nain jaune, Mariage, Rams, Vingt-et-Un, etc.
- De Planches, Orné (1859). Le Salon des Jeux: ou Règles et Description des Jeux de Cartes les Plus Usités dans la Société. Paris: Langlumé.
- Dick, Wm Brisbane (1868). The Modern Pocket Hoyle: Containing All the Games of Skill and Chance as played in this country at the present time (4th ed.). New York: Dick & Fitzgerald.
- Foster, Robert Frederick (1897). Foster's Complete Hoyle (3rd ed.). New York and London: Frederick. A. Stokes.
- Kastner, Hugo; Folkvord, Gerald Kador (2005). Die große Humboldt-Enzyklopädie der Kartenspiele. Baden-Baden: Humboldt. ISBN 978-3-89994-058-9.
- Korn, Karl (1858). Adolph und Walburg: oder die Tannenmühle eine Erzählung aus dem Anfange dieses Jahrhunderts. Augsburg, Bavaria: Lampart.
- Parlett, David (1991). A History of Card Games. Oxford: OUP. ISBN 0-19-282905-X.
- Parlett, David (1996). Oxford Dictionary of Card Games. Oxford: Oxford University Press. ISBN 0-19-869173-4.
- Parlett, David (2008). The Penguin book of card games. London: Penguin. ISBN 978-0-141-03787-5.
- Schneider, August (1883). Elsaessische Kartenspiele oder Erklaerung und Regeln der im Elsass beliebtesten Kartenspiele. Ekart (Staubaus). - Piquet. - Taertele. - Ecarté. - Sechsundsechzig. - Rams. Straßburg.
- Van-Tenac, Charles (1851). Académie des jeux. Paris: Le Normant.
- Von Alvensleben, L. (1853). Encyclopädie der Spiele: enthaltend alle bekannten Karten-, Bret-, Kegel-, Billard-, Ball-, Würfel-Spiele und Schach. Leipzig: Otto Wigand.
