= Julepe =

Spanish card game

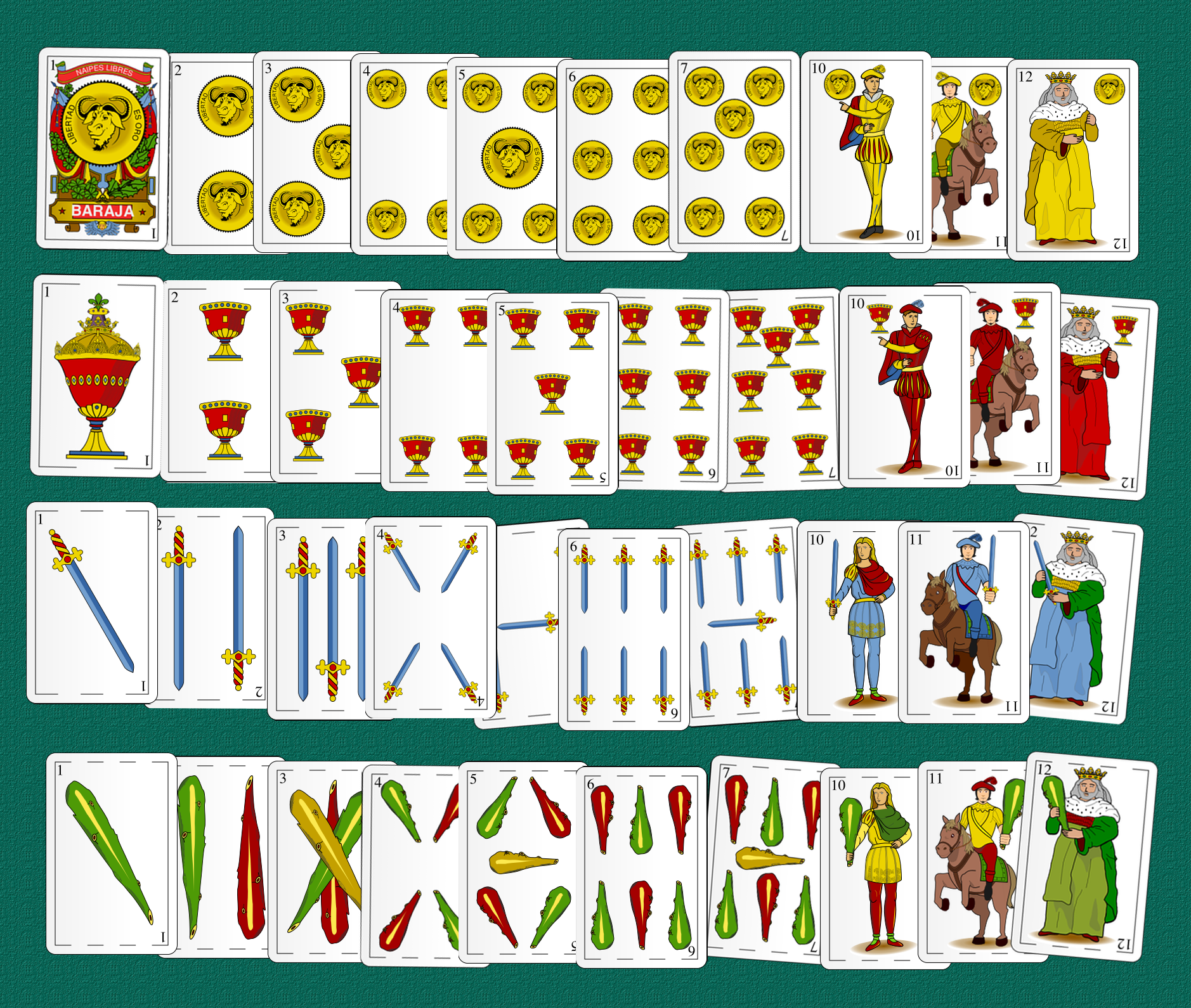
Spanish playing cards used in Julepe

Julepe (Spanish: Julepe, Catalan: Julep, also the variety Xulepe and Gilen.) is a gambling card game of Spanish origin, similar to the English five-card Loo, and best for six players. It spread rapidly across the Spanish-American countries during the 19th century.

Julepe is a variant of Tute and one of the many games of the tute family, and the game is played according to the same rules of tute. It is noted that the original Julepe, in which game three cards are dealt to each player, is the card game presently known as Tomate.

Five cards are dealt to each player from a 40-card pack lacking 8s, and 9s. The next card is turned up for trump. Players may pass or play. Those who play must win at least two tricks, but may first discard and draw any number of replacements.

== Objective ==
To win a game, a player should have the highest value trump card at play, non-trump card, or the highest card of the suit played by the first player. At least two tricks should be gained in game in order to gain chips toward your pot . If the opponent makes less than one, the chips wagered by this player will be subtracted from his pot. Most importantly, the name of the game is to hacer julepe or "Make the whist," i.e. winning at least two tricks during the game, as is the bare minimum.

== Playing the game ==
In each game, each player should play a card, and the one who plays the highest one wins the round and the wagers from that first round, keeping in mind:

a) if the first player to play a card has the Ace of the trump suit, it is recommended that it be played. Otherwise, you should divide the pot, since with this action you force the other players to play a trump card for this round.

b) if the first player leads with a card different from the trump suit, the other players are forced to continue playing that suit. If the player is found to have played incorrectly, that player is forced to split the pot, which is also punishable by falling, or, in the instance that the player does not have that suit, a trump card must be played. If the player has neither of the former cards, any card can be played.

c) if all the cards are of the same suit, the player with the highest value card wins.

d) if the round has begun with a suit different from the trump and a trump card is played subsequently, and the other players after the one who played the trump card are NOT required to play the trump, thus allowing them to play any card.

=== Dealing ===
Prior to beginning the game, cards are dealt to each player face-up, one-by-one around the table, until the first Coin suit (palo de Oro) card appears. The player whom receives this card is deemed the first dealer. The order of play is determined by the person to the dealer's RIGHT in the next round. The dealer deals 5 cards and selects the type of game that shall be played, being either a normal wager or a blind wager game. Depending on the type of game selected, the wager should be defined before beginning to deal and the players should place the same bet before receiving his/her cards. Following this, three cards are dealt to each player.

=== Trump (triumph) ===
After having dealt, the deck is placed in the middle of the table and the top card is flipped. The suit of this first card is thus considered the Trump suit, or triunfo, and any card of this suit automatically beats any card from another suit, despite its value. If the flipped trump card is an Ace or a Three, the player that deals can take this card, without seeing your cards. This player is called the postre (lit. dessert) of the game. The postre takes the trump with the condition that the dealer win three tricks tres bazos, as opposed to merely hacer julepe. Otherwise, the dealer will fall for not having met this condition at the end of the round.

=== Normal wager ===
Now is where the real game begins. The player to the RIGHT of the dealer decides if he passes or plays, and every player afterward follows suit, until the round is over. If the decision to pass or play falls on the dealer, and if no player has selected to play, the dealer deals again and the dealer repeats the round. If only one player decides to play, the Widow is offered, first to the fallen. If the fallen player does not agree, the Widow is offered to the rest of the players, starting with the player RIGHT of the dealer. If no one wants the Widow, the player should play against the dealer. Within those players that decided to play, the first one to the RIGHT of the dealer plays a card first. The next player to his RIGHT plays a card, attempting to beat the previously played card, playing a card of the same suit or, if you have no cards from that suit, a trump card. The player that wins the first hand has thus won a trick, and three hands are to be played this way. (One card=one hand.) If a player that chose to play did not win, did not meet his bid, or the Widow, or chooses to divide the pot, this player falls.

=== Blind wager ===
The dealer deals three cards face-down to each player and each player is forced to play this round. The player RIGHT of the dealer starts the round, placing his card on the table. According to who wins this hand, that player begins the next round. The game is played like this until the whole game is played through. All the players whom did not win are considered fallen.

=== Widow ===
When only one player elects to play (while all other players have elected to pass), the Widow is offered to the other players, which are required to meet the amount of Widows they bid. (A Widow=Three Cards=Three Hands)

=== Fall ===
It is when a player did not meet the bid made previously, with a Widow, or did not win any hands. This player must place an amount equal to the total amount of wagers made in that round into the collective wager pot. (Example: If three players played and bid 3 chips, the fallen places 9 chips into the pot) All the fallen must place this quantity of chips into the pot, absolving the other players from betting.

=== Dividing the pot ===
You divide the pot when you do not play according to the rules and hence distribute the collected wager pot between the winners.

=== Force ===
Condition that forces you to play a card, as long as it is the same as the card thrown initially or not having to play a same-suit card if a trump suit is played before you.

The dealer is always allowed to force, forcing other players to play a face card (jack, horse, or king). The face card is taken and another card is discarded. The one who has forced, is forced himself to win at least 2 tricks.
