= Brisca =

Spanish card game

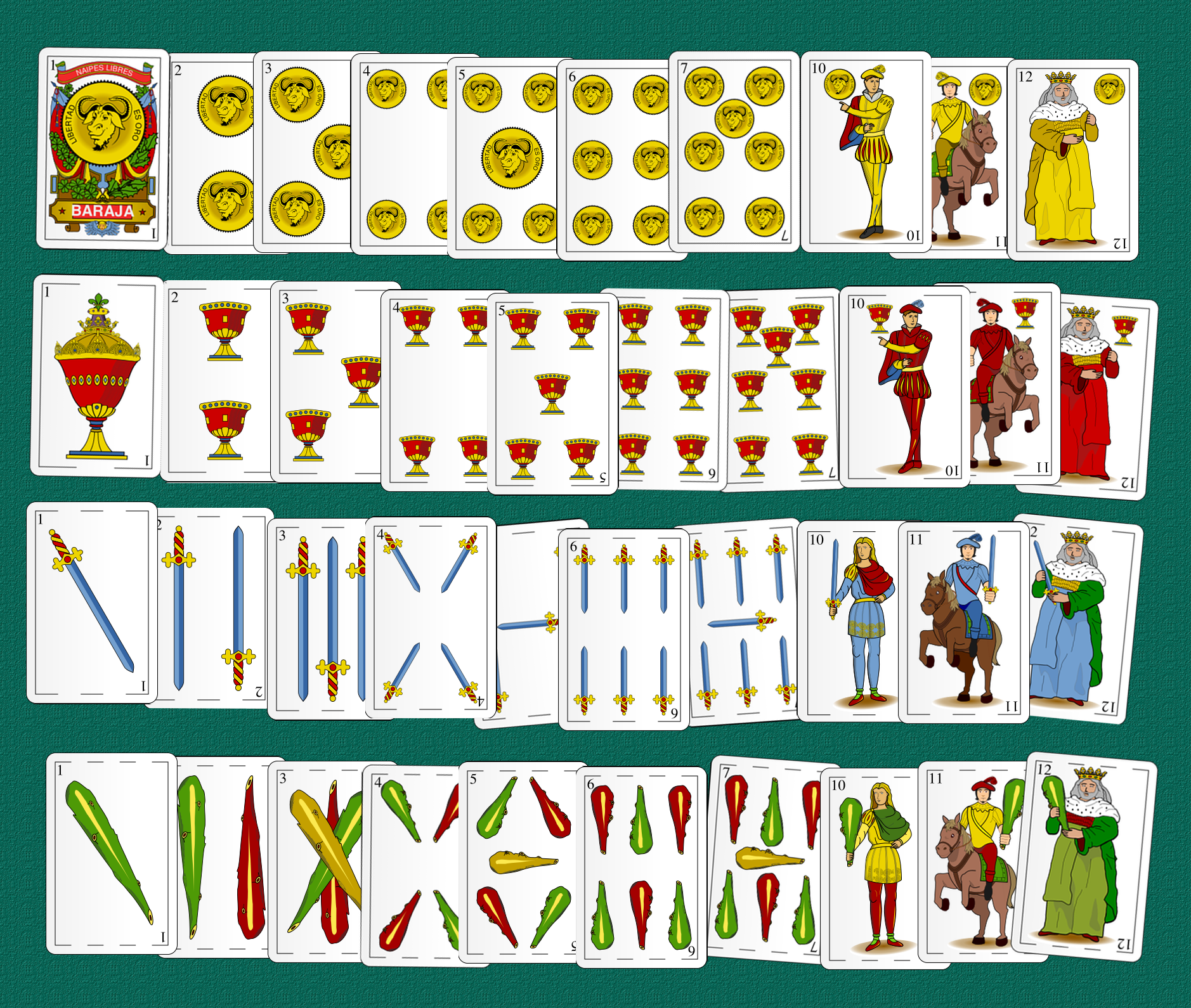
- A 40-card, Spanish-suited pack
- Origin: Spain
- Type: Trick taking
- Players: 2 to 6
- Skills: tactics, memory
- Cards: 40 or 48 cards
- Deck: Spanish
- Rank (high→low): A 3 R C F 7 6 5 4 2
- Play: counter-clockwise
- Chance: Medium

Related games
- Briscola • Calabresella

Brisca is a popular Spanish card game played by two teams of two with a 40-card Spanish-suited pack or two teams of three using a 48-card pack.

== History ==
Brisca and its cousins are widespread in many countries, especially in the Mediterranean and Latin American areas. Related games include Italian Briscola, Lombard Brìscula, Sicilian Brìscula, Neapolitan Brìscula or Brisca, Catalonian Brisca, Portuguese Bisca, Montenegrin and Croatian Briškula, Slovenian Briškola, Maltese Bixkla, and Libyan Skembeel.

Its origin is probably found in Brusquembille, a French game whose rules were published in 1718. The development and scoring of the cards are similar, but Brusquembille was played with a French Piquet pack of 32 cards. This evolved into another game called Brisque that gave rise to Brisca, Bezique and the highly elaborate Briscan. Another theory proposes an Italian origin of from the game of Bazzica, which is similar to Bezique.

== Aim ==
To win this game, a player must earn as many points as possible, winning the rounds. The highest cards of each suit are:

Card					
Number	Ace or One (As or Uno)	Three or Trey (Tres)	King or Twelve (Rey or Doce)	Knight or Eleven (Caballo or Once)	Jack or Ten (Sota or Diez)
Value	11 points	10 points	4 points	3 points	2 points

== Rules ==
=== Deal ===
To start the game, three cards are dealt to each player. In the four-player game, in some variants the players of each pair exchange cards to find out which three cards their partner has. If there are six players they can also exchange cards within their team of three.

=== Trumps ===
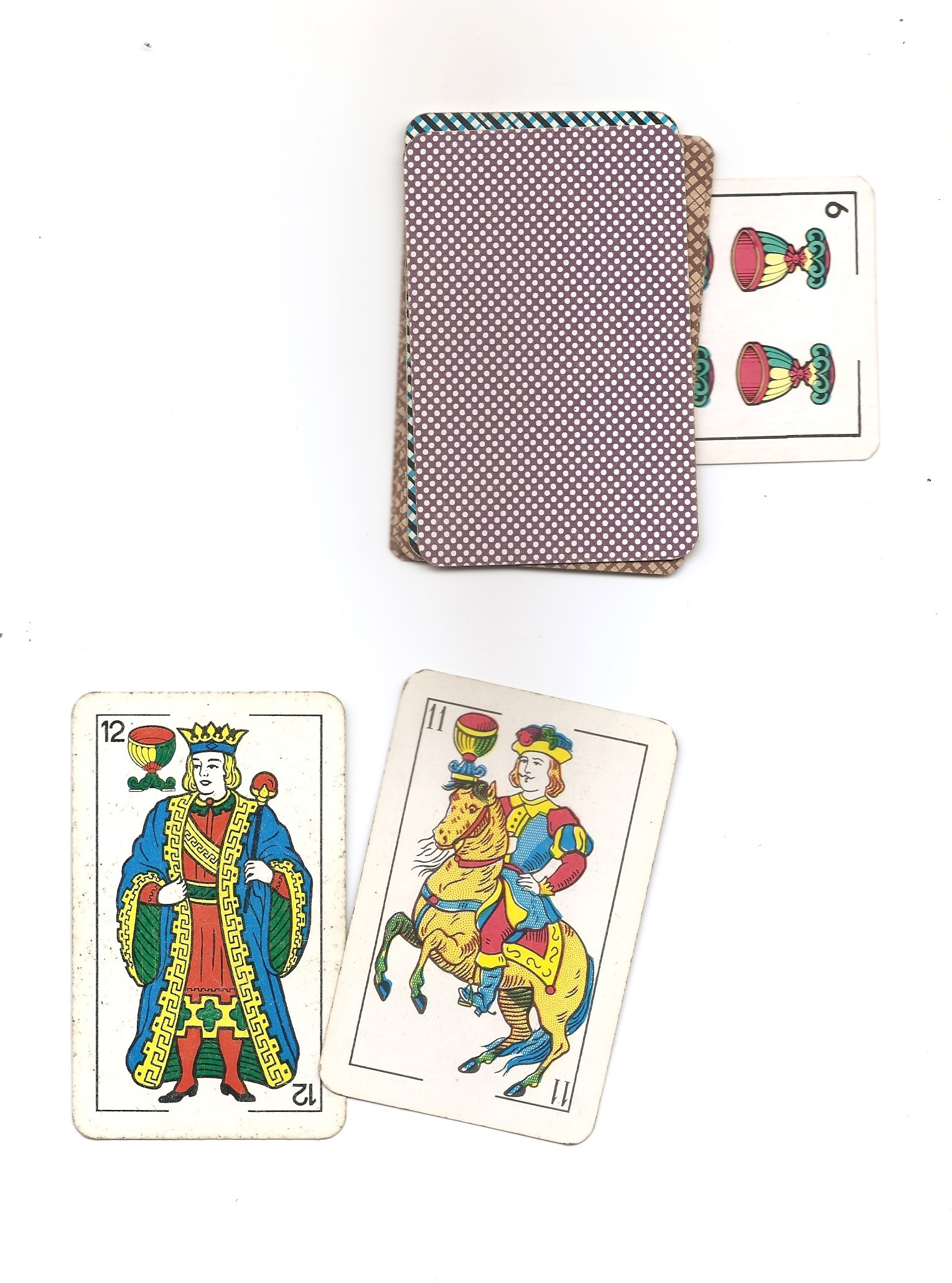
Here, a 6 of cups is tucked under the deck to show that cups is the trump suit

After the cards have been dealt, the remainder are placed in the middle of the table and the top card turned and placed face up. The suit of this card determines which suit is the trump suit; the cards of this suit always beat all of the others, however high they may be. In some game variations, one trump suit is assigned per deal, starting with Coins, that is to say, in the first deal it is Coins; in the second, Cups; in the third, Swords, and finally, Clubs. At the end of these four deals, the player with the most victories or the most points from the four deals wins.

=== Play ===
The player to the right of the dealer leads a card to the first trick and each player plays a card to the trick in turn. Then the player on his right throws another card and so on. If playing between two people then each player must draw two cards alternating the play.

Playing the highest card (assist) is not mandatory as in Tute and a player may choose to play a lower card if they fear, for example, that their opponent may beat it. The last player to play will be the one who has dealt.

The player who plays the highest card wins and takes the trick, bearing in mind that:

a) If all the cards are of the same suit, the player with the highest suit card wins.
b) If cards of different suits are played that are not trumps, the player who has played the highest card of the led suit wins.
c) If plays a trump, the player with the highest trump wins, regardless of the value of the cards in the side suits that have been played to the trick.

After this, the player who has won the trick collects the cards and places them face down in front of him. Players then draw a card from the stock in turn, the player who won the trick first and then the others in counter-clockwise order. Whoever won the trick then leads to the next. This continues successively until the stock is exhausted (17 tricks if two play, 7 tricks if four play and 6 tricks if six play). After the stock is finished, players will play the last three tricks with the three cards in their hands.

If the card that is turned as trumps is greater than Seven, it can be exchanged for the Seven of the same suit by any player who has it, at any time, even while playing a trick, provided that the player in question has won at least one trick. In case the card is Seven or less, it can be exchanged for the Two. Either way, this must be done before the last card of the stock has been drawn.

Towards the end of the game, if a team has in its tricks the three highest trumps, it announces this and collects all the cards, without having to play the final tricks, which they would win anyway. This can also be done when each player has two cards left if they have the two highest remaining trumps in the game.

If a player has the Ace or 1 of the trump suit he may say: "arrastro" ("drag" or "pull") and all the players who have not yet played to the trick must draw the best card from their hands starting with the trump suit in the order: 3, King, Knight, Jack, 9, 8, 7, 6, 5, 4 and 2.

If a player has no trumps, the best card in hand must be played in the order above order.

If, for example, the trump suit is Coins and someone plays the 1 of Coins and says arrastro, if you have not yet played to the trick and you have the 3 of Clubs, 1 of Swords and 1 of Cups; you must play the 1 of Swords or 1 of Cups, but if you have the 3 of Clubs, 1 of Swords and 3 of Coins; you must play the 3 of Coins because it is the highest available trump card you have.

=== Scoring ===
At the end of the game, each team counts the points they have earned, scoring, as explained above, 11 points for each Ace, 10 for each Three, 4 for each King, 3 for each Knight and 2 for each Jack. The other cards, although they may have helped to win tricks, do not score points. The team with the most points wins. Because the total number of points in the game is 120, the side that passes sixty points wins. If both sides tie on sixty points each, the side with the most cards wins. In some variants, winning by more than a hundred card points is worth two game points. Game is usually 3, 5 or 7 points.

== Variants ==
=== Mexican Brisca ===
In some places in Mexico there is another way to win. The objective is not to add more than 11 total points at the end of the game.

=== Briscola ===
In Italy, Briscola is one of the most popular card games in the country along with Scopa and Tressette. In parts of Lombardy and Piedmont a Seven is worth 10 points and a Three is worth nothing. In parts of Tuscany the values of the Jack and Knight are reversed.

==== Briscola to scoperta ====
Briscola to scoperte or "Brisca Ouverte"; the players cards are placed face up on the table. It is normally played between two.

==== Mariaje or Cinquecento ====
The Sicilian game of Mariaje or Cinquecento is played in the same way, except that if in the King and Knight of the same suit are captured; it earns an extra 40 points if they are trumps and 20 if they are from one of the other 3 suits.

==== Briscola Chiamata ====
The best known relative is called Briscola Chiamata. It is played exclusively with five players and all the cards are dealt, so that each one receives a hand of 8 cards.

Further variations:

- Chiamata Buia: trumps are only declared after the first trick.
- Chiamata a punti: only the points to be won are declared, the suit and the card that will determine the pairs and the trump suit are declared only at the beginning of the deal.
- Briscola pazza or Gingo.

=== Brisca Rematada ===
Brisca Rematada is a Chilean game for 3 players. A 40-card pack is used with the Twos and Fours removed to leave 32 cards.

Ten cards are dealt to each player and the remaining two dealt face down on the table, these two cards are called talon.

Players now announce the score they think they can achieve, the minimum bid being 100 points. Players may "pass" if they believe they cannot beat an earlier bid. Once two players have passed, the third player wins the auction, takes the talon adds it to his hand (it is mandatory to show the other players the said cards), selects 2 cards from his hand and places them face down in his pile of countable cards for scoring. The player who wins the "auction" is the one who decides the trump suit for that deal.

When play is finished, the declarer counts his cards to see if he has achieved his bid. If so, the points are added to his score. If he fails, these points are distributed among the other 2 players.

The players who did not win the auction (the defenders) are not considered partners, so the so-called "boarding" strategy cannot be used (whereby if which one of the players does not have cards in his hand of the led suit, but his partner is heading the trick, he can throw any card away).

Tip: it is recommended not to exceed 170 points when finishing as this is calculating the power to obtain the total number of cards with points and the Knight-King combination that scores 40 points, plus 10 points for winning the last trick.

=== Muerte al Tres ===
Muerte al Tres is a Cuban variant in which the aim is to "hunt" or "kill" the Three of trumps with the Ace of trumps. An important note is that the player who has the trump Ace in his hand cannot play it if the Three has not been played (except in the last trick); the trump Ace is a prisoner until the trump Three is discarded, except for the last trick The moment the Three has been "killed" the deal ends and the team or person who killed the Three wins. If the trump Three manages to escape death by the Ace then the points will be counted normally.

== See also ==
- Bezique
- Briscola
- Tute
