= BriSCA =

BriSCA may refer to:

- BriSCA Formula 1 Stock Cars, managed by the British Stock Car Association
- BriSCA Formula 2 Stock Cars, organised by BriSCA F2 Limited

== See also ==
- Brisca, a card game
