= Briscola =

Card game

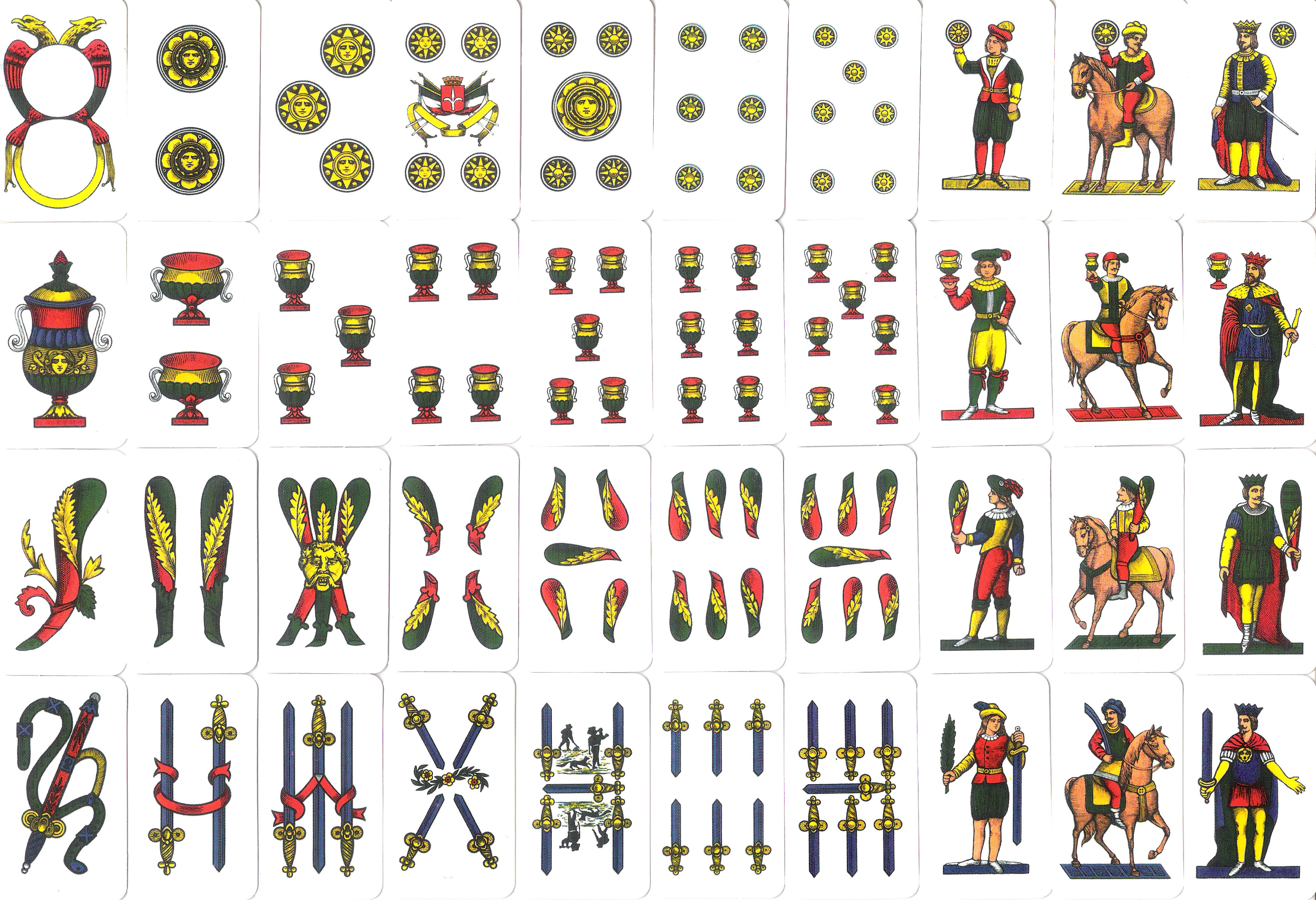
- Italian playing cards from a deck of Napoletane by Modiano
- Origin: Italy
- Type: Trick taking
- Players: 2-6
- Skills: Tactics, memory
- Cards: 40 cards
- Deck: Italian
- Rank (high→low): A 3 R C F 7 6 5 4 2
- Play: Counter-clockwise
- Playing time: 25 min
- Chance: Medium

Related games
- Brisca • Calabresella

Briscola (Italian: [ˈbriskola]; Lombard: brìscula; Sicilian: brìscula; Neapolitan: brìscula) is one of Italy's most popular games, together with Scopa and Tressette. A little-changed descendant of Brusquembille, the ancestor of briscan and bezique, Briscola is a Mediterranean trick-taking ace–ten card game for two to six players, played with a standard Italian 40-card deck.

The game can also be played with a modern Anglo-French deck, without the eight, nine and ten cards (see Portuguese variations below). With three or six players, twos are removed from the deck to ensure the number of cards in the deck is a multiple of the number of players; a single two for three players and all four twos for six players. The four and six-player versions of the game are played as a partnership game of two teams, with players seated such that every player is adjacent to two opponents.

== The cards ==
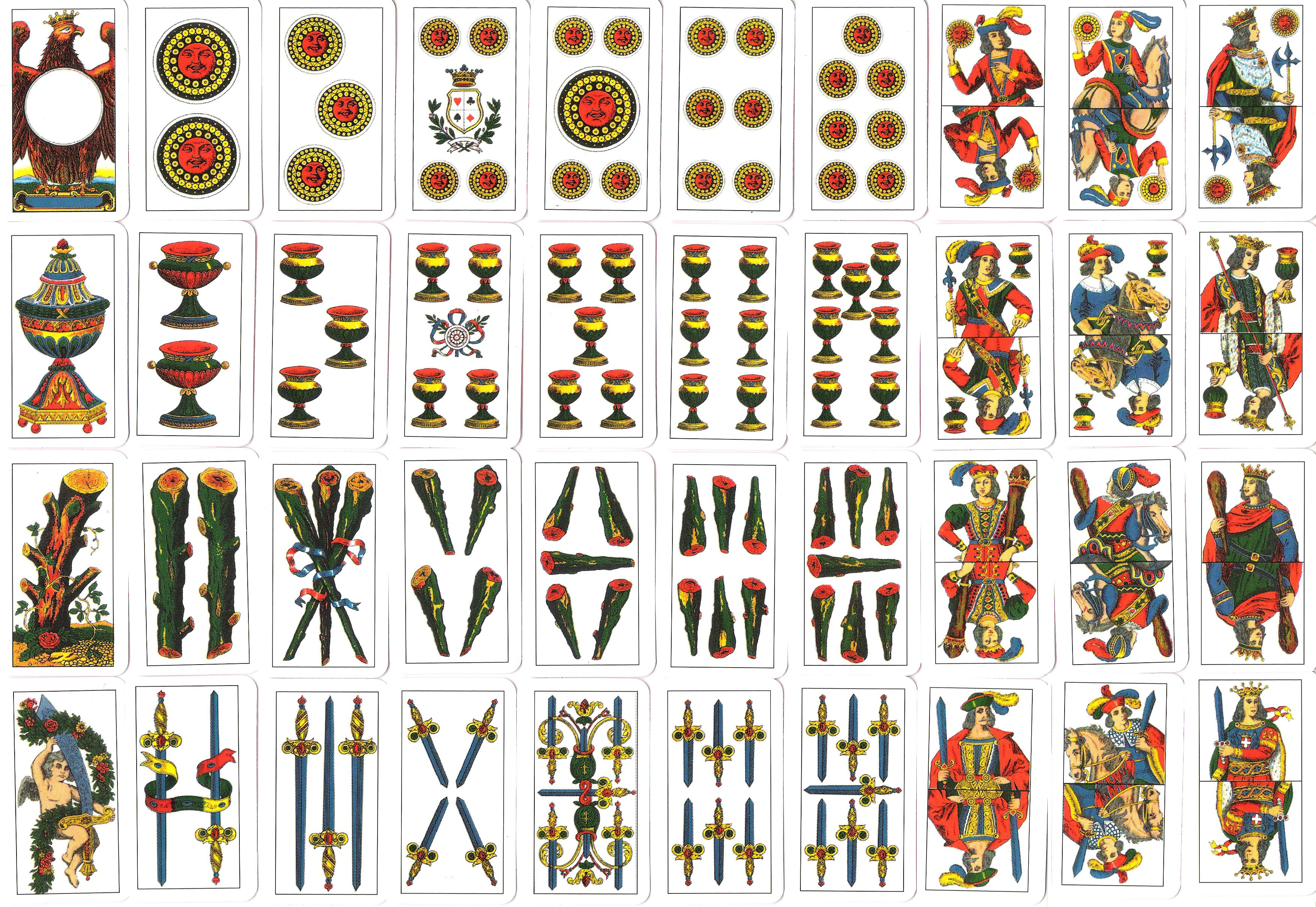
Complete carte piacentine deck by Dal Negro

The traditional Italian-suited pack used for briscola consists of forty cards, divided into four suits: coins (Italian: Denari), swords (Spade), cups (Coppe) and batons (Bastoni). The values on the cards range numerically from one through seven, plus three face cards in each suit: knave (fante), knight (cavallo), and king (re). The knaves depict a man standing. The knight is on horseback. The king wears a crown. (Played with a French deck, queens take the place of knights or knaves.) To determine the face value of any numeric card, simply count the number of suit icons on the card. The ace card of coins is usually a type of bird with a circle in the middle.

Below is a table identifying card rank and point values. Unlisted cards have no point value, and are ranked in descending ordinal value, from seven to two. Note, however, the odd ranking of the three.

Cards, by rank	Point value
Ace (asso)	11
Three (tre)	10
King (re)	4
Knight (cavallo)	3
Jack (fante) also called woman (donna)	2

In total, a deck has 120 card points. To win a game, a player must accumulate more points than any other player. If two players (teams) have the same number of points (60) another game is played to determine the winner.

== Play ==
After the deck is shuffled, each player is dealt three cards. The next card is placed face up on the playing surface, and the remaining deck is placed face down, sometimes covering half of the up-turned card. This card is the briscola, and represents the trump suit for the game. Before the game begins if a player has the deuce of trumps they may retire the briscola. This move may only be done at the beginning of the game or first hand. Before the first hand is played (in four player game), team players may show each other their cards. Deal and play are anti-clockwise.

The player to the right of the dealer leads to the first trick by playing one card face up on the playing surface. Each player subsequently plays a card in turn, until all players have played one card. The winner of that trick is determined as follows:

- if any briscola (trump) has been played, the player who played the highest valued trump wins
- if no briscole (trumps) have been played, the player who played the highest card of the lead suit wins

Unlike other trump card games, players are not required to follow suit, that is, playing the same suit as the lead player is not required.

Once the winner of a trick is determined, that player collects the played cards, and places them face down in a pile. Each player maintains their own pile, though the four- and six-player versions may have one player collecting all tricks won by his partners. Then, each player draws a card from the remaining deck, starting with the player who won the trick, proceeding anti-clockwise. Note that the last card collected in the game should be the up-turned briscola. The player who won the trick leads to the next.

=== Scoring ===
After all cards have been played, players calculate the total point value of cards in their own piles. In partnership games, the partners combine their points. 61 card points are needed to win and 60-all is a draw. Briscola is usually played for the best of 3 or 5 games, however, Pennycook records a variant whereby 1 game point is scored for a simple win, 2 for scoring 91 or more and 3 for scoring 120, regardless of whether or not all tricks are taken. Games is then 12 points.

In a three-hand game, if two players score over 40, they each score 1 game point. If only one player achieves this, that player scores 2 game points. A player taking 120 card points gets 3 game points. If there is a three-way tie for 12 points, play continues until one has a lead. If there is a two-way tie, the third player drops out and play continues as a two-hand game.

Alternatively, when four play, game may be set at 121 or 151 card points; thus played over at least 2 deals.

== "Conquista" or black hand ==
This is a popular add on to the game, which originated in the Italian version of "briscola" but has been widely accepted in the Spanish version of brisca. La conquista ("The conquest" in Spanish language) is also known as mano negra or sota negra ("black hand" or "black jack") in Spanish brisca. The black hand is defined as when a player automatically gets in their hand the king card, 3 and 1 card of the chosen "briscola". When those three cards are gathered by the player, they are shown to the opponent and the game is automatically won in spite of the points that the opponent has gathered throughout the game which might or not have exceeded the player's points.

=== Signalling ===
In four- and six-player variations a system of signaling is often allowed between members of the same team. In this variant, the first round is played without speaking, and on all subsequent rounds, players are permitted to signal their partners and attempt to signal without the other team noticing. A common system of signaling is as follows:

- Ace – stretch the lips over the teeth or purse lips
- Three – wink or distort the mouth to one side
- King – glance upwards or raise eyebrows
- Knight – shrug one shoulder
- Knave – show the tip of the tongue or lick your lips
- Threes or aces outside of the briscola suit – quickly open and close your mouth

=== Variations ===
There also exists a variation whereby the three, is ranked as a three (i.e. a four can beat it) but maintains its status as worth 10 points. However, as mentioned, this is a variation and not standard rules.

In some parts of Italy (located mainly in Piedmont and Sardinia), the three as the second most valuable card is substituted by the seven, like in Portuguese Bisca (see below).

== Briscolone ==
Briscolone is a two-player variant whose rules vary slightly. Examples include:

- Players are dealt 3 cards each as normal. Game is 121 or 151 points and there are no trumps. In the last 3 tricks, players must follow suit and head the trick if able.
- Players receive 5 cards instead of 3. There are no trumps. Game is 121 or 151. There is often an additional rule that players are required to follow suit.
- Players are dealt 5 cards. The first card played is a trump. Players need not follow suit.

The name is sometimes given to the five-player variant below.

== Briscola chiamata ==
Briscola chiamata (English: declared briscola) sometimes also called briscolone, although that is the name of a two-player variant (see above), is the five-player version of briscola. Every player is dealt eight cards, so that no cards remain undealt. Then the bidding phase begins, the purpose of which is to decide the trump suit (Briscola) and to form two uneven groups that will play against each other.

In one variant, each player, starting from the dealer's right and proceeding counter-clockwise, bids on progressively lower card values, according to the peculiar sorting of cards used in the game. Thus, if the first player bids on a Three, the second player can only bid on a king or lower. If a player bids on a Six, the next player can only bid on a Five, Four or Two. Bidding continues until all but one player have passed in a round. This remaining player has then "won the bid" and therefore gets to declare the Briscola, i.e. the trump suit. If they had bid on a Three, for example, they could choose "Three of Cups": the trump suit will be Cups, and the holder of the "Three of Cups" is determined to be the declarer's partner, though if the player holds that card themselves they will play with no partner.

In another variant, bidding proceeds in the same fashion, but players declare how many points they will score (61 or more), if someone declare 120 points he may call two cards. A player may pass, and hence cannot bid again in that game. The bid represents the number of points that player believes they are capable of accumulating. In this variant, whoever declares the trump suit also declares a specific Briscola card (example, the "Ace of Cups" if Cups was the declared Briscola) and the holder of this card is then determined to be the declarer's partner, however, they can not openly declare this and their identity is only conclusively revealed when the named card is played.

The two variants can be combined. Most commonly, the bid starts as in the first system but a bid of Two can be beaten by a bid of "Two with 65 points". Alternatively, any player can "force" the bid and ask subsequent players to keep the same card but increase the score. This is useful whenever a player has low-value cards such as a Two or Four in their strongest suit.

In both systems the declarer can declare the highest Briscola card they do not already hold in the hopes of creating the strongest combined hand with their partner, but can also "bluff".

After the bidding phase, the game proceeds in the same way. First, the remaining three players are partnered with each other, without their knowledge; each player, other than the declarer's partner, acts independently, until it is clear which players are partners. Infrequently, the declarer may declare a Briscola card they already hold (if they feel they have a very strong hand), in which case the other four players are partnered against the winning bidder.

Because of the unique method of declaration and blind partnering in this variation of the game, it is considered to be one of the most entertaining variations of the game. Game strategy is often devised to determine which player is partnered with the declarer, whereas the declarer's partner may devise ruses and decoy strategies to fool the other players, such as not taking a trick, or playing points on a trick that will be won by an opponent.

=== Scoring ===
Briscola Chiamata also features a unique scoring scheme. Each player collects tricks as per the regular version of the game, and counts points collected similarly. Partners, which are known by the end of the game, then combine their points. Game points are assigned as follows:

- if the declarer and partner accumulate card points greater than or equal to the points that were declared after the bidding process
  - the declarer earns two game points
  - the partner earns one game point
  - the other players each lose one game point
- if the declarer and partner accumulate fewer card points than declared
  - the declarer loses two game points
  - the partner loses one game point
  - the other players each earn one game point

These points are accumulated after every game. The grand winner is the player with the most points at the end of the last match. If the declarer calls a Briscola he holds, then the declarer will win or lose four points, and every other player will win or lose one point.

All these scores are doubled if the winning team gets all the 120 points in the deck. This is a very difficult endeavour and is called "fare cappotto". The term sounds mysterious in Italian as fare cappotto means "make a coat". A mythical but likely explanation is that an antecedent of the Briscola game was introduced in Italian ports by Dutch sailors (perhaps derived by klaverjas). In Dutch, when a team has a total victory, they make the adversary "kapot" (in German Kaputt). However Klaverjas is quite a different game, as the trump is chosen automatically and players must follow suit. In briscola, players are free to play any card so the game is more strategic and less mnemonic.

Usually, players determine the number of game points to accumulate in order to declare the grand winner, typically ranging from 10 to 20 points.

=== Variation ===
In some variations, when calling a two, the declarer can opt to have a "blind" first hand, in the sense that the caller does not announce the suit until the hand has been played. It is rather intriguing to play a hand of briscola without knowing what suit is briscola nor whom one plays with. To further complicate the blind hand, any two played has to be covered (face down). The briscola has to be announced before the cards are turned. The blind first hand can also be restricted to bids that have a score of 62 or higher.

Another variation, this time on the "score bidding" method, is that the declarer can only choose a suit, the called rank being implicitly a two.

There is a popular variation of the "briscola" game where it is played with all cards faced up instead of down, with the purpose of not hiding any cards for the benefit of the opponent to see. The players can see all the opponent's won cards, the current hand and the deck's next card to pick.

== Briscola scoperta ==
The Briscola scoperta (Uncovered Briscola in English) is a variation where the cards are dealt face up to each player. The deck is also upturned so that the first card to be drawn is visible. This variation usually leads to more thoughtful play; remembering which cards have already been played is also very important.

== Adriatic variation ==
=== Briškula ===
In Slovenia, Croatia and Montenegro, the briscola game is called briškula and it is played predominantly in the coastal region. The game is played with Triestine cards in the normal Italian fashion. There is also a popular variation called briškula Dalmatian style or dupla briškula (double briškula). This variation is exactly the same as the regular Italian game except that each player plays two cards separately during the course of a trick. This variation is used when the game is played by two players, where four cards are dealt to both players and then the player to the right of the dealer leads the first hand (or trick) by playing one card face up on the playing surface. Each player subsequently plays a card in turn, until both have used two cards. The winner of that trick is determined by the normal rules of briscola. When played in couples, briškula uses regular rules, where all players are dealt three cards, and play one card per hand each.

== Portuguese variations ==
=== Bisca ===
In Portugal, the briscola game is called bisca and it is played with a modern Anglo-French 52-card deck. The 8, 9 and 10 cards must be removed from this deck, though, in order to obtain the 40 cards needed to play. The Kings equal to the Italian-deck kings, the Jacks equal to the knights, and the Queens equal to the knaves (to know the reason why the Jack ranks higher than the Queen, see Latin-suited cards in Portugal). The seven (called bisca or manilha), and not the three, ranks above the face cards. Thus:

Cards by rank	Point value
Ace (ás)	11
Seven (bisca or manilha)	10
King (rei)	4
Jack (valete)	3
Queen (dama)	2

=== Sueca ===
The Sueca is arguably the most popular game in Portugal, being also very popular in Portuguese former colonies and enclaves such as Brazil, Angola, Mozambique, Goa and Macau. Being a partnership game for four players, also played with 40 Anglo-French cards which rank the same as in Bisca, Sueca can be considered a variation of the 4-player Briscola, where all cards are dealt and players have to follow suit.

==== Sueca Italiana ====
The Sueca Italiana (which means "Italian Sueca", evidencing the origin of the game) or just Italiana is the Portuguese variation of the Briscola Chiamata, also played with an Anglo-French deck. The bidding and card playing phases are identical to the Italian version — Bisca card ranks and values always apply, though — but the scoring system is a bit different.

== See also ==
- Tressette
- Trappola
- Truc
- Brisca

== Literature ==
- Pennycook, Andrew (1982). The Book of Card Games. London/NY: Grenada. ISBN 0246117567
