= Cuarenta =

National card game of Ecuador

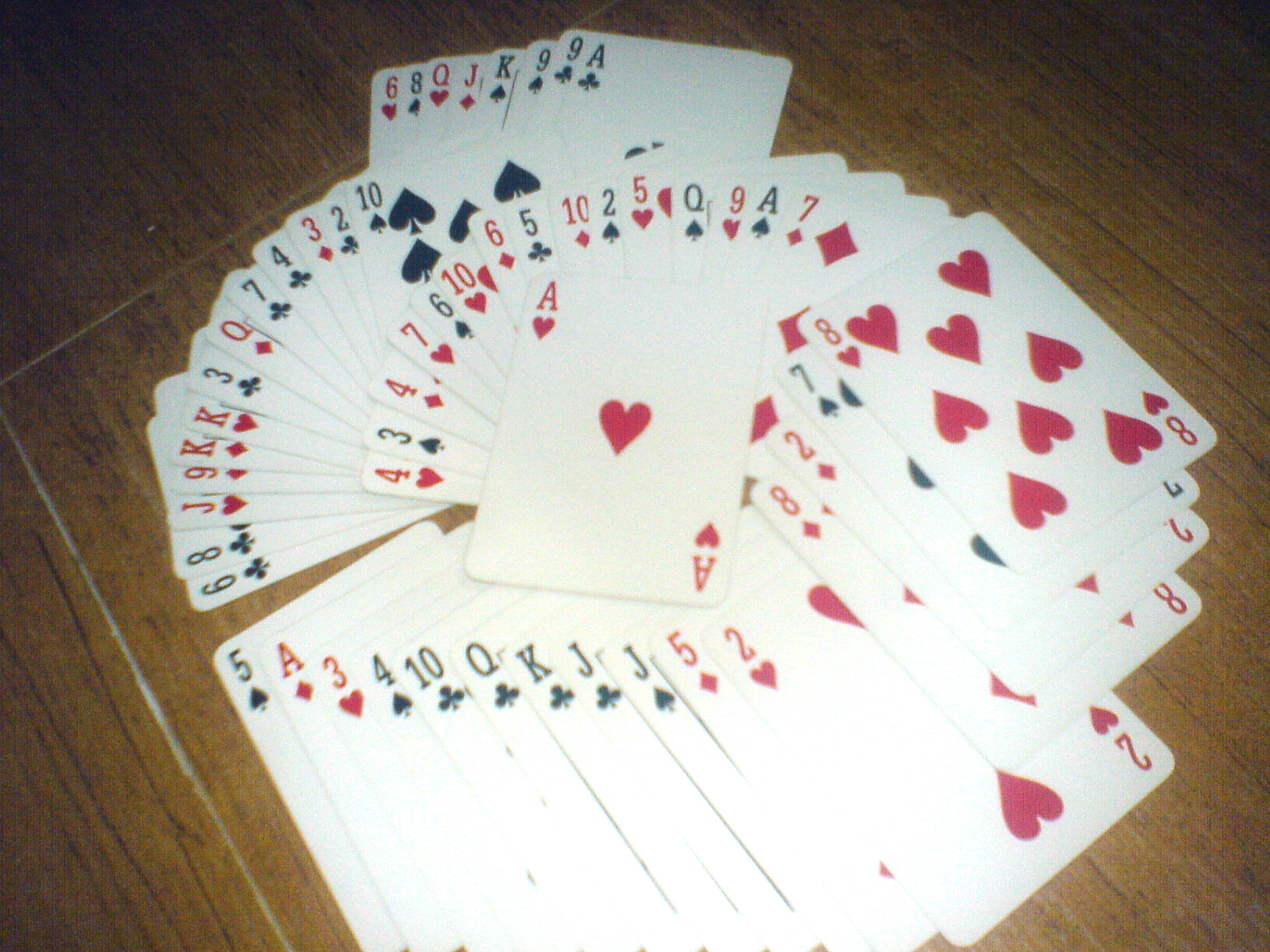
- Origin: Ecuador
- Type: Fishing
- Players: 2 or 4
- Cards: 40 cards
- Deck: Spanish
- Play: Counter-clockwise
- Playing time: 20 min.
- Chance: Easy

Related games
- Scopa

Cuarenta is the national card game of Ecuador. It is a fishing game played with the standard 52 card pack of Anglo-American playing cards, but all 10s, 9s and 8s are omitted (ace is low).

This game is almost exclusively played in Ecuador. The name of the game, cuarenta is Spanish for the number 40 (forty). This refers to the number of points that are required to win a chica (small division of the game) and also to the number of cards used to play it. Two chicas or the first chica with zapatería (loss of the chica by scoring less than ten points) win the game (a completed game is called a "mesa", literally meaning "table", which in this context refers to "match"). The game can be played by 2 players, or 4 players split into two teams. Cuarenta is the national card game of Ecuador and even has official tournaments.

The score is kept with two kinds of chips, the two-point tantos (points) and the ten-point perros (dogs). When a standard 52 card pack is used, the 8s, 9s and 10s can be used to keep the score.

== Game ==
Five cards are dealt to each player, given out as a hand of five cards at a time starting counterclockwise. The opponent of the dealer or the opponents of the dealer's team are given ten points if there are any irregularities during the deal itself, and the dealer's turn is handed over to the opponent ("pasa la mano con diez", hand over the deal with ten points). A typical indication of these irregularities is that the dealer finds himself or herself with 4 or 6 cards in his or her hand after the second deal. The cards left over after the first deal are placed face down on a stack to the side.

Before the first individual turn after each deal, special announcements have to be made by each player if applicable. These are the doble ronda (four cards of the same rank) and the ronda (gathering of people, patrol, gang; three cards of the same rank). A doble ronda automatically wins the game; a ronda scores two points.

The player to the dealer's right begins. The turn to play passes counterclockwise. Each player plays one card face up onto the table. Cards on the table may be captured by the opponent. If cards are captured, they are placed face down in front of the player or his teammate. Played cards remain on the table until they are captured or the round ends. Cards can be captured in the following three ways: matching (card same rank as on the table; player places matching card onto own pile), addition (two cards add to the value of the other; a 2 and a 4 can be captured by a 6; an ace, a 2 and a 4 can be captured by a 7; cards with pictures have no value and cannot be captured this way), and sequence (a card captured by matching or addition entitles the picking of the next higher card; matching a 2 entitles the capturing of the 3 and 4 (etc.), as well, should there be any). Note that, due to the absence of 8s, 9s, and 10s, the Jack follows the 7 in sequence. A table with the cards 3 4 J Q K can be cleaned with a 7 (3 and 4 add to 7, then J Q K continue the sequence), capturing a total of 6 cards. The Ace does not follow the King. The Ace counts as one for all purposes of this game.

== Scoring ==
If a player clears the table by capturing all cards, he scores a limpia (meaning a cleansing or a wiping out of the table; 2 points). If a player captures the card just played by the player before, this is called a caída (meaning a fall. These two often happen at the same time; under the "official" Quito rules of the Asociación de Periodistas Deportivos de Pichincha (the association of sports journalists of the province of Pichincha), no additional points are scored for this combination (the caída or the limpia may be scored, but not both). In the Cuenca rules variation, both events are scored, for a total of 4 points. This variation in scoring is not necessarily regional. Some tournaments may give the match (chica) for a doble ronda or caida en ronda in the interest of shortening the duration of the entire tournament. In Quito only 4 points are given for doble ronda or caida en ronda. A summary of these variations is shown below:

Style	Todo dos (Quito)	A todo rigor
Caida y limpia	2 points	4 points
Caida en ronda	4 points	chica
Doble ronda	4 points	chica
Tres caida y limpia	no additional points	chica

After all five cards are played, there is a new deal. After a new deal, caída does not apply to any cards remaining on the table. After all cards have been played (2 deals with 4 players, 4 deals with 2 players), each player or team counts their collected cards. If the number of collected cards is 20, 6 points are scored; an additional point is given for each captured card in excess of 20, rounded to the next even number. So, 21 cards gives 8 points, 22 cards still gives 8 points. 23 or 24 cards give 10 points. If both teams capture 20 cards, neither side scores 6 points. In this case and all other ties, the non-dealing team scores 2 points. This is called dos por darlas, "two for dealing (next)", as the scoring team will deal the next round. If neither team captures 20 cards, the team with more cards scores 2 points.

If a team reaches exactly 38 points, that team is "out of play," called 38 que no juega (38 that doesn't play). The final two points that achieve victory may only be scored by caída. Existing captured cards, limpia, ronda will not count towards closing the game for that team.

A chica is won when a player or team reaches 40 points. The game is won when a player or a team wins two chicas or when the opponent doesn't reach ten points at the end of the first chica (this last kind of loss is known as "zapatería"). Losing as zapatero immediately disqualifies the team from a tournament or match.

If the opponent loses with "zapatería" (he doesn't score a perro = ten points), he's called "zapatero", probably because he ends up "poor" like a shoemaker (zapato = shoe). It may also be related to the expression "Cero, zapatero", a common rhyme colloquially used when referring to the number cero.

== Similar card games ==
A similar game called Ronda is the most popular card game in Morocco.

== See also ==
- Mus (card game)
- Tute
- Cinquillo
