= Tute =

Trick-taking card game of the ace–ten family

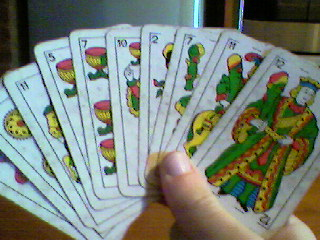
- A player of Tute holding the ten cards as a fan
- Origin: Italy
- Alternative names: Tutti
- Type: Trick-taking
- Players: 2 or 4
- Skills: Tactic; Teamwork (Tute in Pairs)
- Age range: 7+
- Cards: 40 cards
- Deck: Spanish
- Rank (high→low): 1 3 12 11 10 7 6 5 4 2
- Play: counter-clockwise
- Playing time: 8–10 minutes per hand
- Chance: Medium

Related games
- Briscola

Tute (Spanish pronunciation: [ˈtute]) is a trick-taking card game of the ace–ten family for two to four players. Originating in Italy, where it was known as tutti, during the 19th century the game spread in Spain, becoming one of the most popular card games in the country. The name of the game was later modified by Spanish speakers, who started calling the game tute. The game is played with a deck of traditional Spanish playing cards, or naipes, that is very similar to the Italian 40-card deck.

The classic version of the game is two-player tute, while the most played is tute in pairs, where four players form two teams. The object of the game is to score the most points in the baza (a pile next to a player that contains the cards that the player gets after winning a trick) and by declarations (holding certain combinations of cards). Due to its wide popularity, several variations of the game exist.

== Overview ==
Tute originated in Italy. The game belongs to the same family as Brisca and has similar rules of play and final count of points. The name of the game originated from the Italian word tutti (all), the declaration that a player announces when holding the four kings,or four Jacks. The game spread to Spain during the 19th century, brought back by Spanish troops who returned from missions in Italy. As the popularity of the game increased, its name was modified over time by Spanish speakers, who started calling the game tute. The game became one of the most popular in Spain, leading to the later appearance of regional variations of the game. In Mexico, the game was known as tuti.

The game is played with a Spanish deck of cards, which is divided into four suits: Oros (coins), Espadas (swords), Copas (cups) and Bastos (batons). The 8s and 9s of each suit are excluded, leaving forty cards in the deck. The object of the game is to score the most points in the baza and from declarations (see Scoring below).

== Rules ==
=== Two-player tute ===
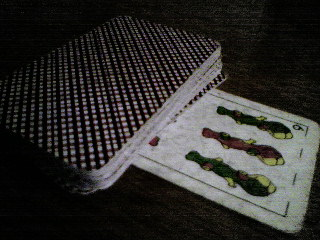
Position of the trump in the deck in a two-player game

This variation of tute is called "tute habanero". Each player is dealt eight cards and the next is turned for trump. The upcard is placed perpendicular and beneath the stock.

The non-dealer leads any card to the first trick. The second player must follow suit and head the trick if possible. If the second player is void in the led suit, but has one or more trump cards, he must play a trump. Only if the second player has no cards of the led suit and no trumps, may any other card be played. The trick is won by the higher trump or, if no trumps are played, the higher card of the led suit.

The winning player takes both cards of the trick, and places them face down in separate pile on the table, called the baza. These cards remain out of play until scores are calculated at the end of the round.

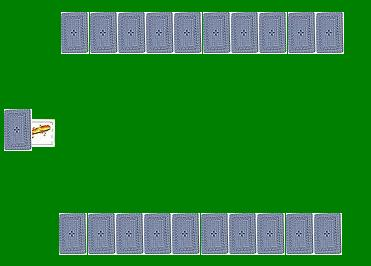
Position of the cards in a two-player game

The winner of the trick takes the first card from the stock, and the loser the second. The trick winner may then make any announcements before leading to the next trick. Thus, until the stock runs out, so that, until that point, they each hold eight cards at the start of every trick. When the trump upcard is higher than a 7 (Ace, Three, King, Knight, or Knave), the player that holds the 7 of trumps may able exchange it for the upcard. The 7, and cards of lesser value (6, 5, and 4), may later be exchanged only by a 2. The trump exchanges are allowed anytime in the game until only two cards remain in the stock.

After a player makes the first baza, that player is allowed to make declarations. Declaring is allowed until the last two cards are left in the stock (the last face-down stock card, and the trump upcard below it). After these last two stock cards are picked up, all of the cards the players hold must be played in order to finish the deal. When the deal is over, the players tot up their scores (see Scoring below). After the counting ends, and their scores are calculated, the cards in the bazas are mixed again in a single stock to be dealt at the start of the next deal.

=== Tute in pairs ===
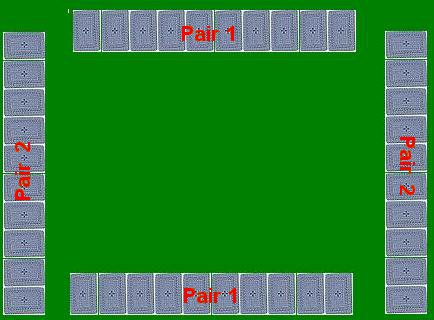
Position of the players in a pairs game

Tute in pairs is played by four players—two teams of two players each—and every player receives ten cards (since there are 40 cards, this means that all of the cards in the deck are dealt). The last card to be dealt is shown to the rest of the players and becomes the trump. This card belongs to the player it was dealt to. The four people sit in a circle, with opponent players to the right and left of each player, and players sitting opposite their team members.

One person plays a card, and the player to the right of this person, from the opponent team, plays a card. As with two-player tute, if the second player has one or more higher cards of the same suit as the first player's card, one of these must be played. If the second player has cards of the same suit, but only ones of less value than the first card, one of these must be played. If the second player does not have any cards of the same suit but has one or more trump cards, one of these must be played. If the second player has no cards of the same suit and no trumps, any other card can be played.

Now, the next player to the right plays a card following the same rules as the second player: if possible, a card of the same suit as the first player's card must be played, higher than the first two cards if possible; or if this is not possible, then lower; if no card of the same suit is held, then if possible, a trump card must be played; if no trump card is held, then any card may be played. The fourth player likewise plays a card following these same rules.

When all four cards of the trick are on the table, the pair that played the card with the strongest card wins the hand. The trump suit beats the other three suits, with the ranking of trump cards from strongest to weakest as follows: Ace-3-King-Knight-Knave-7-6-5-4-2. The next strongest suit is the one the first player played, again with the card rankings being Ace-3-King-Knight-Knave-7-6-5-4-2. Cards of the other two suits always lose to trumps and the first player's suit. The winning team places the four cards from the trick into their baza. The rules for the declarations are similar to two-player tute, but it is mandatory to declare the cards after a player or the partner begins a baza. Only the scoring team can declare. To declare their cards, the opposing team has to begin a baza. Declaring cards in the plays that follow the beginning of a baza is not allowed. After the hand is over, the counting starts (see Scoring below). When the counting ends, and after the score is calculated, the cards in the bazas are mixed again in a single stack to be dealt at the start of the next round. The deal of cards rotates counter-clockwise during the subsequent hands.

== Scoring ==
Tute games are played until an established number of game points is reached. Each time one of the competitors wins a round, one point is added to the total score of the player or pair. New rounds are played until a player or pair reaches the game points goal (three and six point games are the most common). When the number is reached the player or pair wins.

The winner (or the pair of winners) of the round is determined by the total of round points each player (or pair) collects. These points are calculated as the sum of card values in baza, bonus points for declarations and the final trick bonus.

=== Card values ===
The values of cards are associated with their ranks:

Card					
Name	As (ace)	Tres (three)	Rey (king)	Caballo (knight)	Sota (knave)
Value (points)	11 points	10 points	4 points	3 points	2 points

The rest of the cards (7-6-5-4-2) are called cartas blancas (white cards) because their value is zero round points.

=== Declarations ===
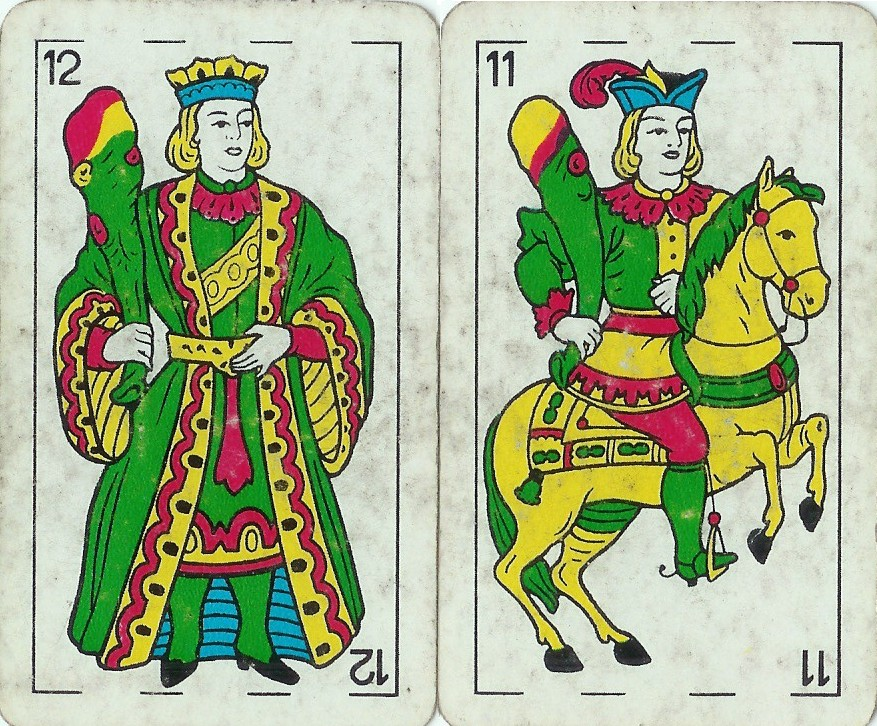
Depending on the trump suit, this combination gives the player 20 or 40 additional round points

A player (or a pair), who wins at least one trick receives an ability to gain more round points upon declaring the card combinations. In tute in pairs the declarations can be performed until the end of round; in two-player tute, this ability persists until only two cards are left in the deck.

The player, who collected all the four kings, is entitled to declare tute (all), which automatically ends the round with a collector's victory. Having both king and knight of the trump suit, one can declare las cuarenta (forty), scoring additional 40-round points. The combination of king and knight of any other suit can be declared as veinte (twenty); it adds 20 round points to the player's score. If possible, a player can declare several combination. In such cases the declarations with the higher round point value must be made first. For example, after declaring veinte the player loses right to declare las cuarenta, though declaring another veinte is still allowed. In two-player games the declaration order rule only applies to declarations between each trick is played, so the player can declare las cuarenta after veinte if the combination is collected by picking the previously missing card from the stock.

The total of the round points the player (or pair) has gained is calculated as the sum of values of the cards collected in the baza and the values of the declared combinations. The winner of the last trick also receives ten bonus round points. The total value of the deck (and thus the maximum number of round points) is 230 points.

Example
Points for cards collected in baza						Declarations		Last trick won	Total
Card rank	Knaves	Knight	King	Three	Ace	Las cuarenta!	Veinte	Last trick won	Total
Amount	2	0	1	3	2	Las cuarenta!	Veinte	Last trick won	Total
Points	2×2	0×3	1×4	3×10	2×11	1×40	0×20	1×10	110

== Variants ==
Due to the popularity of the game in Spain, modifications to the traditional rules have appeared regionally, creating variations. The variants are played with similar rules to normal tute, but differing in the number of cards, rules for declarations, and other minor modifications of the traditional rules.

== Sources ==
=== Bibliography ===
- Cambas, Manuel Rivera (1883). Mexico Pintoresco, Artistico y Monumental. Vol. 3. Mexico: Reforma.
- Álvarez Fernández-Novo, Fernando (1998). Vocabulariu de Riosa [Riosa Vocabulary] (in Asturian). Academia Llingua Asturiana. ISBN 978-84-8168-114-7.
- Arts, Niké (1999). Enciclopedia de los Juegos de Cartas [Encyclopedia of Card Games] (in Spanish). American Bar Association. ISBN 978-84-7927-351-4.
- Farina, Giampiero; Lamberto, Alessandro (2006). Enciclopedia Delle Carte. La Teoria e la Pratica Di Oltre 1000 Giochi [Encyclopedia of Cards: The Theory and Practice of About 1000 Games] (in Italian). Hoepli Editore. ISBN 978-88-203-3672-1.
- Hervey, George F; Parlett, David Sidney (1994). Teach Yourself Card Games. NTC Publishing Group. ISBN 978-0-8442-3685-8.
- Kany, Charles Emil (1929). Fiestas y Costumbres Españolas [Festivities and Traditions of Spain] (in Spanish). George Harrap.
- Marco, Luis & de Ochoa y Ronna, Eugenio (1897). Repertorio Completo de Todos los Juegos [Complete Repertoire of All Games] (in Spanish). Bailly-Bailliere e hijos.
- Rojo, Guillermo (1977). Verba [Verbs] (in Spanish). Vol. 3–4. Universidad de Santiago de Compostela.
- Román y Salamero, Constantino; Kron, Richard (1911). El Castellano Actual: Lecturas y Conversaciones Castellanas Sobre la Vida Diaria en España y en los Paises de Lengua Española [The Current Castilian: Castilian Readings and Conversations About Everyday Life in Spain and the Spanish-speaking Countries] (in Spanish). Bielefeld.
- Wilson Server, Alberta (1947). Hispania. Vol. 30. American Association of Teachers of Spanish and Portuguese, American Association of Teachers of Spanish.
- Editorial Paidotribo staff (2003). Enciclopedia de los Juegos: Las Reglas de 500 Juegos [Encyclopedia of Games: The Rules of 500 Games] (in Spanish). Editorial Paidotribo. ISBN 978-84-8019-717-5.
