= Burro (card game) =

Spanish card game

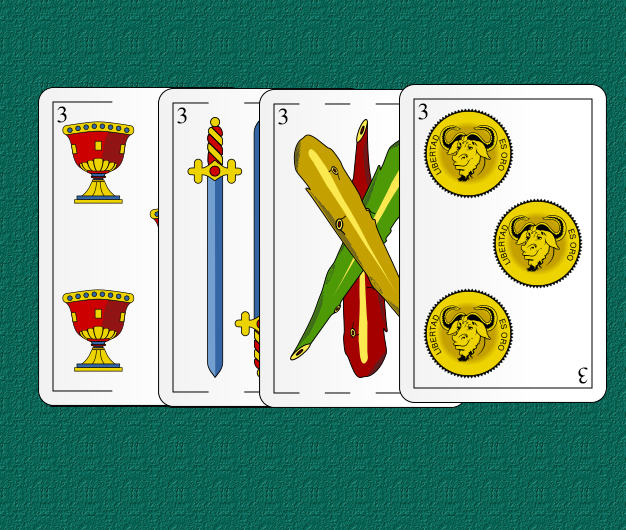
The four 3s

Burro (English: donkey) or los burros is a card game played with Spanish playing cards. The principal objective of the game is to get four cards of the same number. The ideal number of players is from 4 to 8.

== Objective ==
The objective of the game is to run out of cards as quickly as possible. Each time one of the players lose, they are assigned a letter of the word burro. The player who is first to complete the word becomes the ultimate loser of the game. The final winner will be the player who has failed to complete the word when others do. To win a game a player must place their hand face down in the middle of the table.

== Techniques ==
There are several techniques used to win burro. One of them, called amago (English: feint) is to place a hand in the center of the table, saying a word other than burro. If a player puts their hand in the center, they will be assigned a letter. However, if no one puts their hand in the center, the letter will be assigned to the player who made the hint. Another technique would be feign putting one's hand down.
