= Spanish-suited playing cards =

Card deck used in Spain

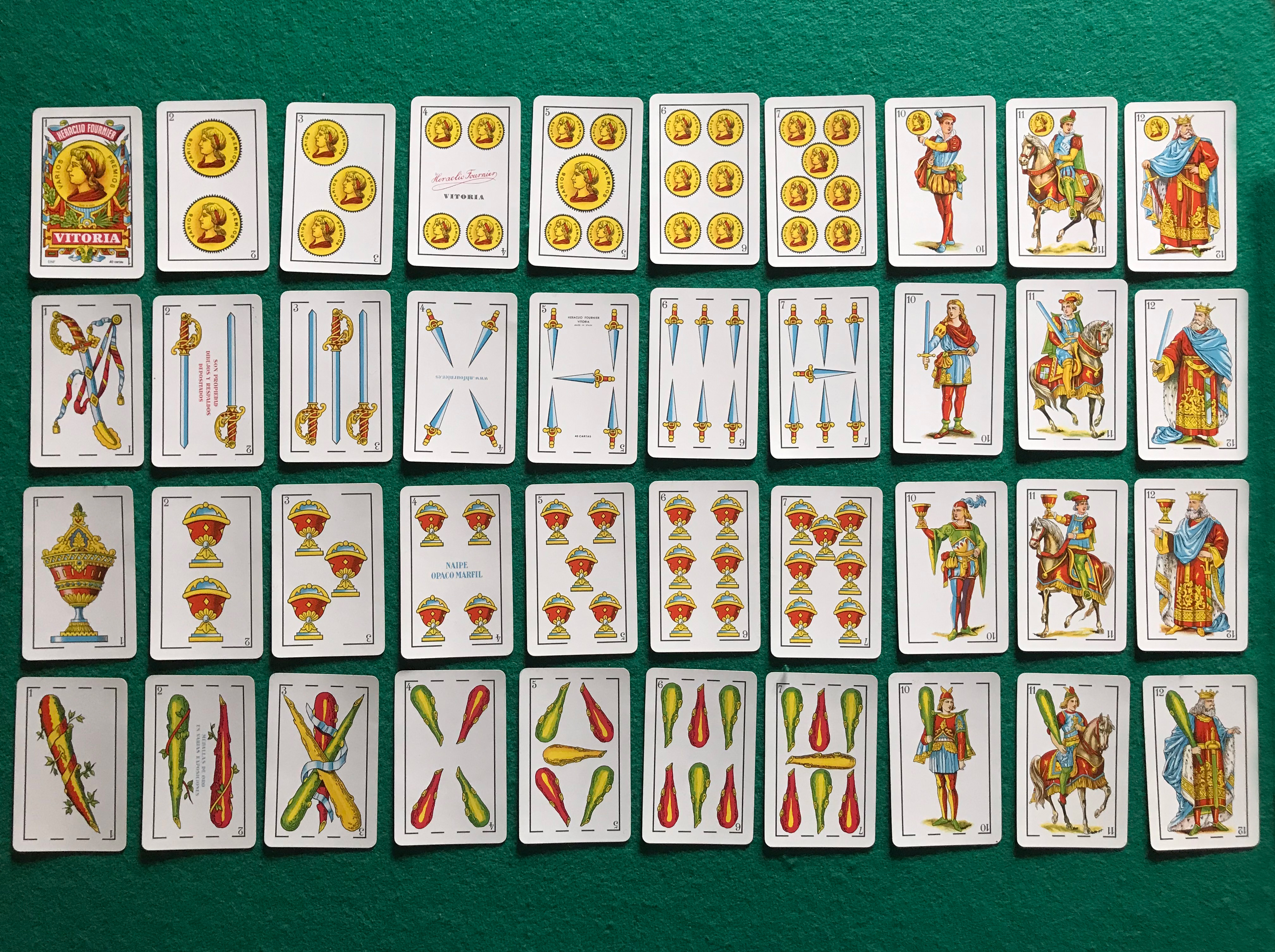
Castilian pattern introduced by Heraclio Fournier

Spanish-suited playing cards or Spanish-suited cards have four suits, and a deck is usually made up of 40 or 48 cards (or even 50 by including two jokers). It is categorized as a Latin-suited deck and has strong similarities with the Portuguese-suited deck, Italian-suited deck and some French decks. Spanish-suited cards are used in Spain, Italy, parts of France, Hispanic America, North Africa, and the Philippines.

== Description ==
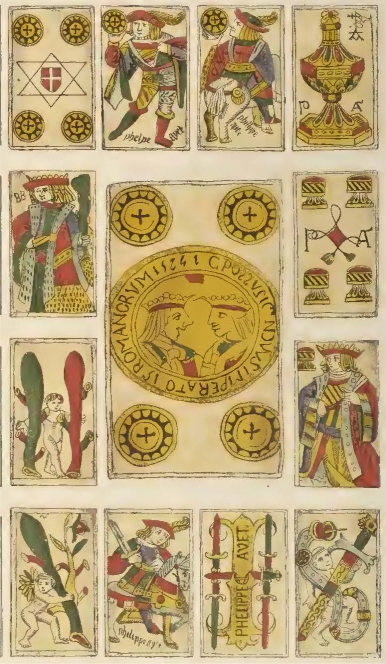
Toledo pattern cards from 1574. They are closely related to the Seville and Franco-Spanish patterns.

Playing cards, originally of Chinese origin, were adopted in Mamluk Egypt by the 14th century if not earlier, and from there spread to the Iberian peninsula. The Spanish word naipes (playing cards) is a loan word from nā'ib, ranks of face cards found in the Mamluk deck. The earliest record of naip comes from a Valencian rhyming dictionary by Jaume March II in 1371, but without any context or definition. By 1380, naipero (card-maker) was a recognized profession. In December 1382, card games were banned from being played in Barcelona's corn exchange. Valencia's town council issued a blanket ban on un novell joch apellat dels naips (a new game called cards) in 1384.

"Moorish-styled" cards were produced in Catalonia during the late 14th or early 15th century. Unlike modern Spanish decks, there was a rank consisting of 10 pips suggesting that the earliest Spanish packs consisted of 52 cards. The removal of one rank shortened the deck to 48 which made card production simpler: a whole deck could be made with just two uncut sheets. 48-card decks have nine ranks of pip cards (1–9) and three ranks of face cards (10–12). Since the mid-20th century, they have usually been sold with two jokers, for a total of 50 cards. Stripped decks have 40 cards, lacking ranks 8 and 9 and jokers. The popularity of the stripped deck is due to game of ombre, which became a craze throughout Europe during the 17th century.

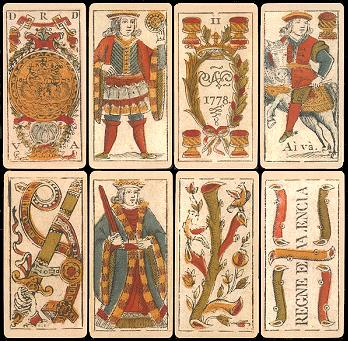
Valencia pattern cards from 1778. They are closely related to the Old Catalan pattern.

The Spanish suits closely resemble Italian-suited cards as both were derived from the "Moorish-styled" cards. The four suits are oros (literally "golds", that is, golden coins), copas (cups) espadas (swords) and bastos (clubs),. Unlike the suits found in northern Italy, Spanish swords are straight and the clubs resemble knobbly cudgels instead of ceremonial batons. Swords and clubs also do not intersect (except in the 3 of clubs card). Two surviving early decks did have intersecting clubs and swords as in Italian or Mamluk cards. The Spanish may have separated the pips in the 15th century to make them more easily distinguishable (some export cards kept the intersecting pips, such as the Portuguese deck). Each card has an outline frame to distinguish the suit without showing all of your cards: The cups have one interruption, the swords two, the clubs three, and the coins none. This mark is called "la pinta" and gave rise to the expression: le conocí por la pinta ("I knew him by his markings"). La pinta first appeared around the mid-17th century. Like the Italian-suited tarot, the deck is used for both game playing and cartomancy. The Spanish deck has been widely considered to be part of the occult in many Hispanic American countries, yet they continue to be used widely for card games and gambling, especially in Spain.

The three face cards of each suit have pictures similar to the jack, queen, and king in the French deck, and rank identically. They are the sota, which is similar to the jack/knave and generally depicts a page or squire, the caballo (knight, literally "horse"), and the rey (king) respectively. There are instances of historical decks having both caballo and reina (queen), the caballo being of lower value than queen. These decks have no numbers in the figure values, not even letters as in the French deck. Reversible face cards exist but are not popular. It is also possible to find 52-card French decks with Spanish pictures. These have English corner indices which means the Knight will have the Queen's "Q" index.

In the 16th century, Spain became the first country to tax playing cards. The various regions kept track of the taxes they were owed by requiring producers, who were often monopolies (estanco), to conform to a regional pattern for cards sold locally. Known regional patterns include the Seville, Madrid, Toledo, Navarre, Valencia, and Catalonia patterns. There were also export patterns, possibly including the little known Toulouse/Girona pattern or the "Dragon cards". Spain and France exported cards to each other, which explains why the kings and jacks in French-suited face cards resemble their Spanish counterparts, notably the standing kings. There was some deliberate copying; the king of coins from the Seville and Franco-Spanish patterns is near identical to the king of hearts in the French-suited Rouen pattern, which was exported to England and through centuries of bad reproduction became known as the "suicide king".

== Current standard patterns ==
Standard patterns are card designs in the public domain that have been printed by multiple publishers in the past or present. These are regional patterns that are still in use today. Decks with 50 cards have two jokers.

=== Castilian pattern ===
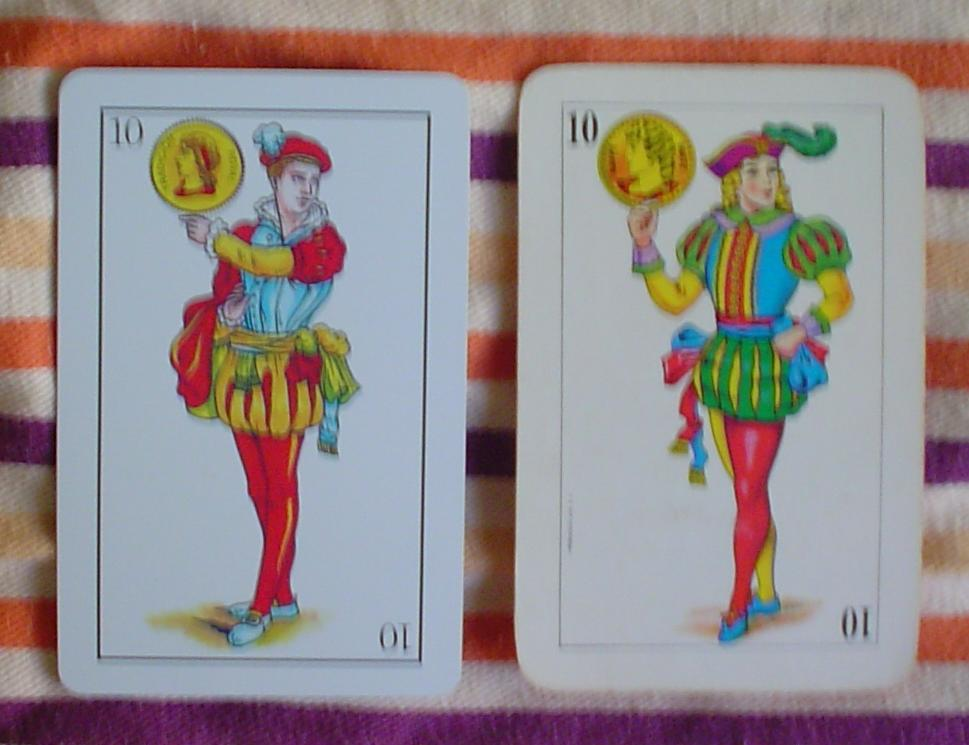
Knave of coins, Castilian (left) and Mexican (right)

The Castilian pattern is the most widespread pattern in Spain. It was designed and published by Heraclio Fournier in 1889 and by the early 20th century had displaced the older patterns in Spain. Fournier made some noticeable innovations to Spanish cards such as giving the kings beards, adding faces to the coins, dagger-like swords, and red cups. Figures wear fantastic pseudo-medieval costumes. Decks come in packs of 40 or 50 cards.

Castilian Suits
Suit				
(United Kingdom)	Coins	Cups	Swords	Clubs
(Spain)	Oros	Copas	Espadas	Bastos

The Mexican pattern was derived from the Castilian in 1923 by Clemente Jacques. The knights wear wide brim hats but its most notable feature is the conversion of all the knaves to females. They come in decks of 40 cards but 50 card decks were once produced.

=== Spanish National pattern ===
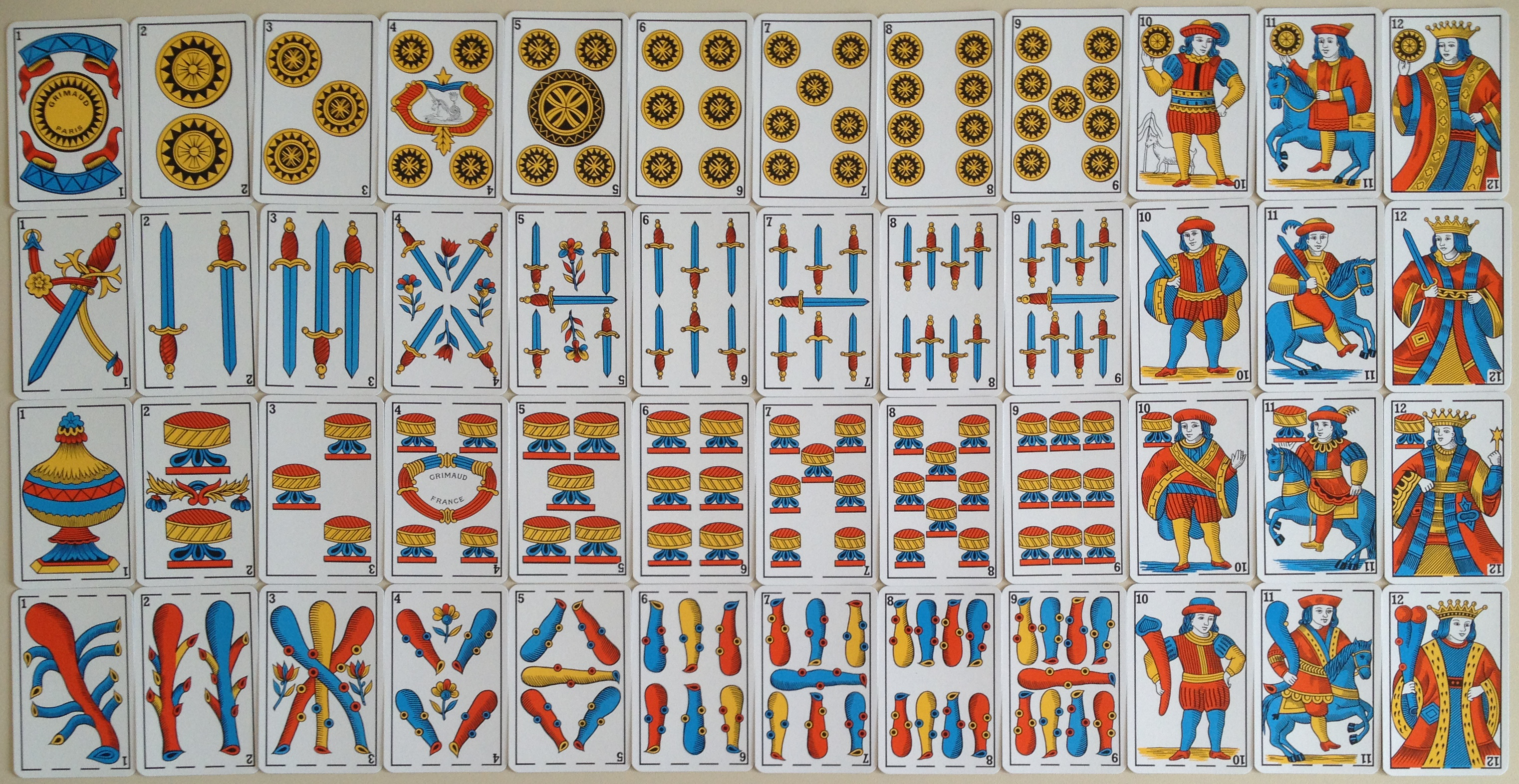
Spanish National or Old Catalan pattern. Note la pinta around the edges.

The Spanish National pattern, also known as the Old Catalan pattern, emerged in the 17th century from Barcelona and was chosen as the national and export pattern by the Real Fabrica monopoly during the late 18th century. This decision meant that the Madrid, Toledo, Valencia, and Seville patterns were no longer printed. After the collapse of the Real Fabrica during the Peninsular War, the pattern in its pure form ceased printing in its native country but led to the birth of the various daughter patterns described below. It is currently found in North Africa, especially in Morocco and Algeria, and Ecuador. Kings wear long robes that go all the way down to la pinta. Usually, the knave of coins features a goat (originally a dog) tethered to a pole in the background like in the Parisian Spanish pattern. Sometimes the knight of cups has the archaic inscription "AHI VA" printed on it. They are found in decks of 40 or 48 cards.

The Cádiz pattern is now found in the Philippines and parts of Hispanic America. It was derived from the Spanish National pattern. It was never popular in its home country and was created primarily as an export to the colonies. It uses the old golden chalice of the Spanish National pattern and the knight of cups has the archaic inscription "AHI VA" printed on it. Kings wear long robes that expose their feet while lower courts have puffy shoulders and quilted trousers. They are found in decks of 40 or 50 cards.

Cádiz Suits
Seme				
(United Kingdom)	Coins	Cups	Swords	Clubs
(Spain)	Oros	Copas	Espadas	Bastos

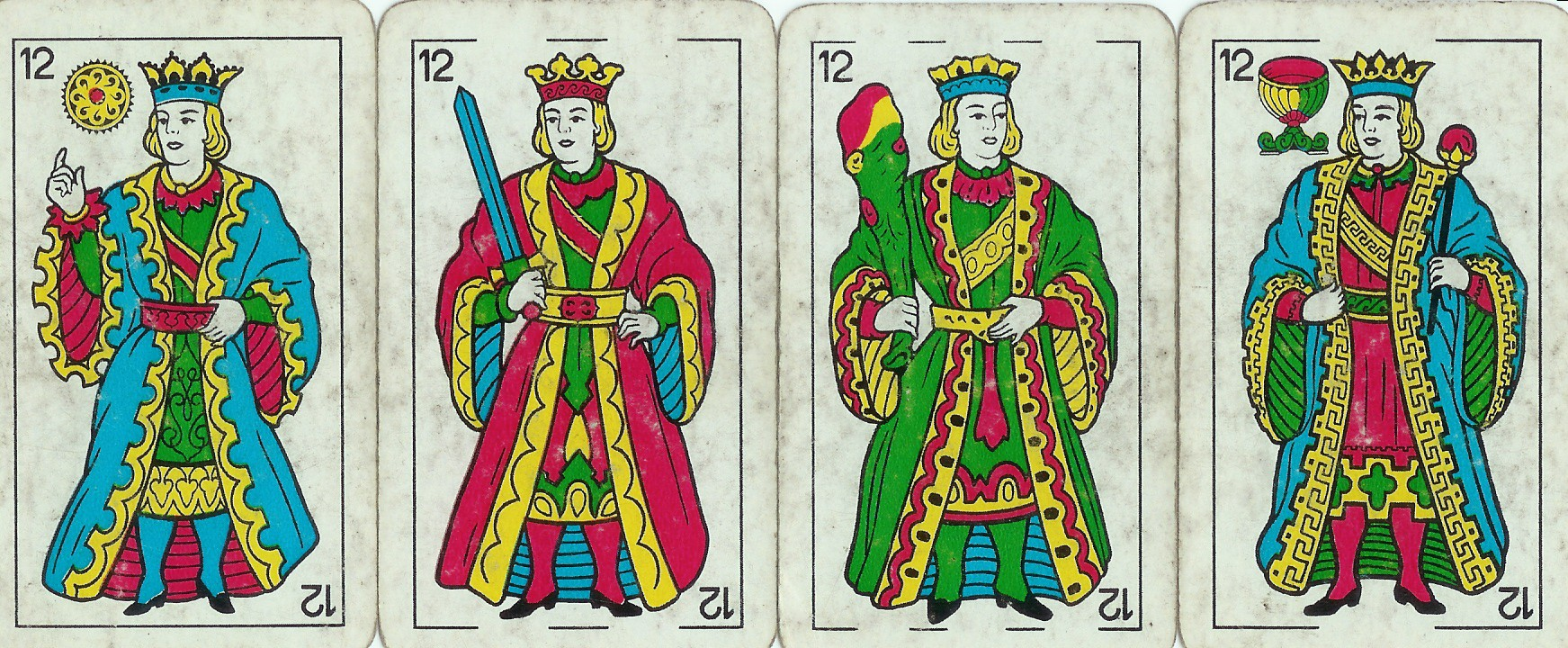
Modern Spanish Catalan pattern kings

The Modern Spanish Catalan pattern is the second most widespread pattern in Spain and is very common in Hispanic America. The most distinguishing feature is the shape of the cups which now resemble yellow and green egg cups. Kings' robes are parted to expose their calves. Court figures are clean-shaven but in the Comas type all kings have mustaches. In the Guarro type, the kings of cups and swords have beards, their knights and the knave of swords have mustaches. They come in decks of 40 or 50 cards.

Modern Catalan Suits
Suit				
(United Kingdom)	Coins	Cups	Swords	Clubs
Catalonia	Oros	Copes	Espases	Bastons
(Spain)	Oros	Copas	Espadas	Bastos

The French Catalan pattern also emerged from the Spanish National pattern. It kept the original shape of the golden cups but added beards to the kings. Kings wear long robes that completely obscure their legs and feet. Ducale, a subsidiary of Cartamundi's France Cartes, is the last producer of this pattern. It is sold in decks of 48 cards for playing the local version of the game of Truc.

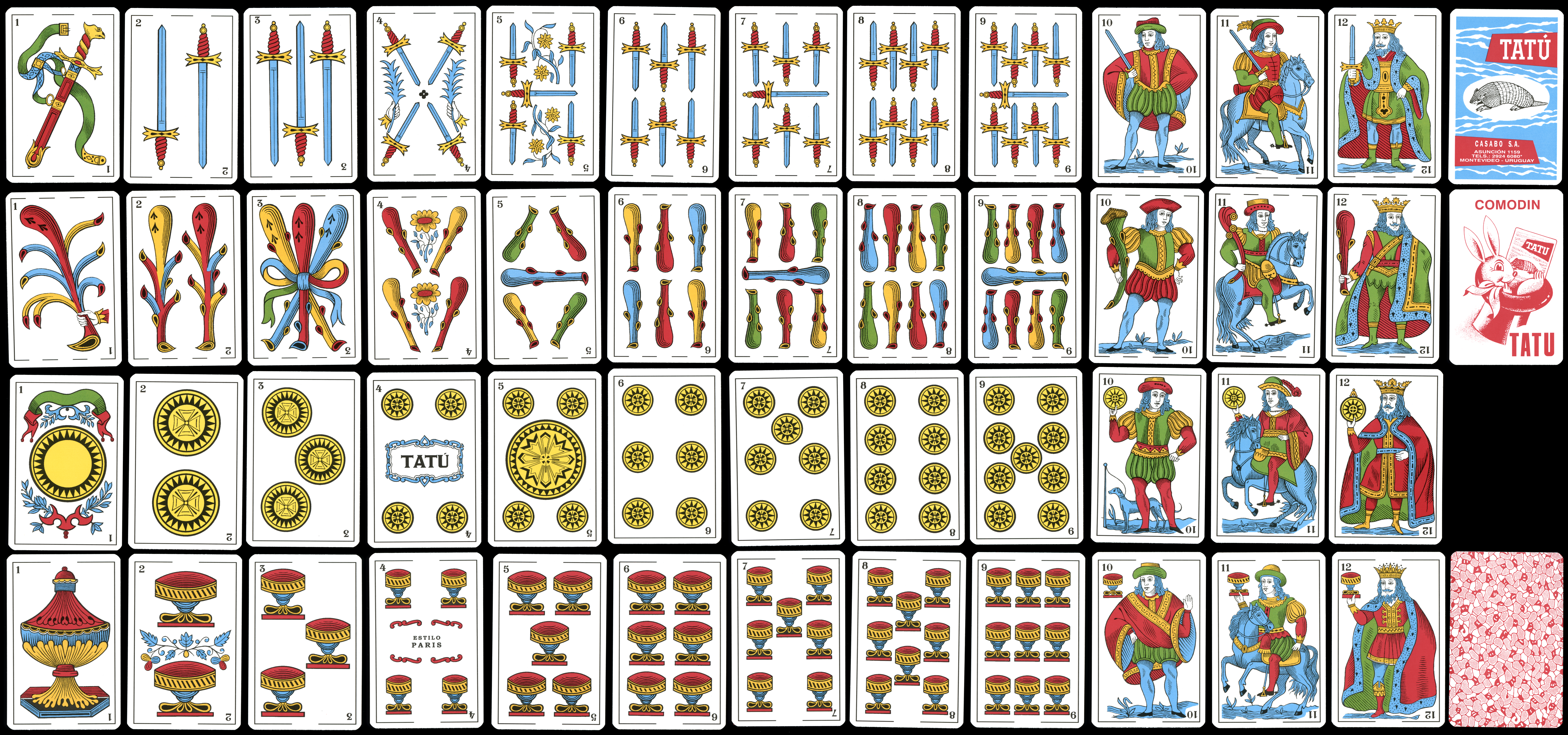
Estilo Paris cards, Tatú brand.

The Parisian Spanish or "Estilo Paris" pattern survives only in Uruguay. It was formerly found in other parts of South America such as Ecuador and Colombia. It originated as a Spanish export to France which was in turn copied by Parisian card-makers and exported to South America. It contains many influences of Aluette. In the oldest decks, female knights were featured. The three lowest club cards also have Aluette styled arrows. A hand is holding the Ace of Clubs in a manner reminiscent of the Tarot de Marseille. Sometimes the four of coins depicts a sea monster in the middle like some Spanish National decks. The knave of coins features a dog tied to a pole. They are sold in decks of 40 or 50 cards.

=== Franco-Spanish pattern ===
The Franco-Spanish pattern was the pattern that existed and was used throughout France possibly before the invention of French suits. It is strongly related, if not derived from, the extinct Seville pattern. Although extinct in its original form, it has given rise to the following patterns, all of which lack la pinta and numeric indices.

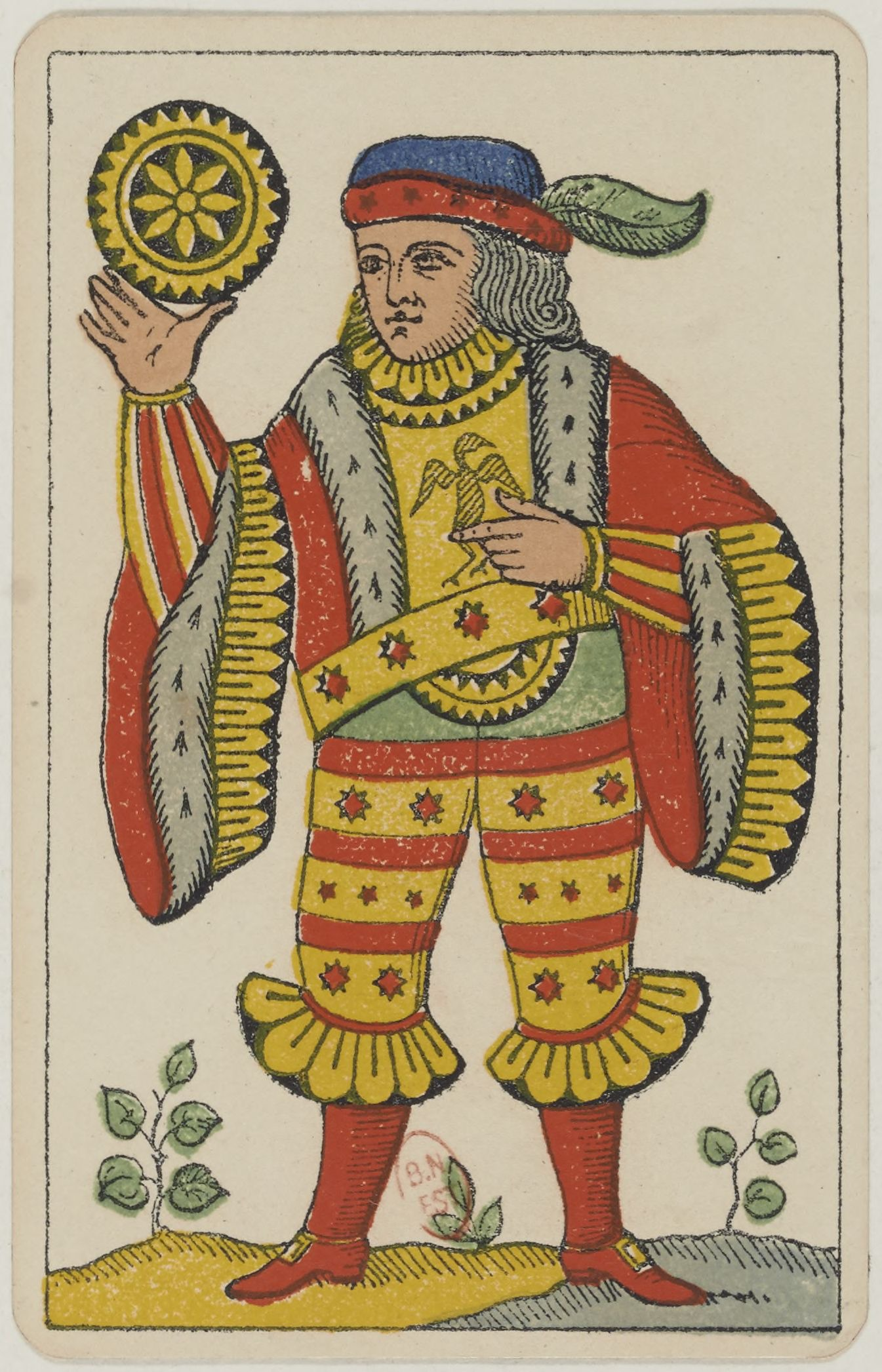
Aluette knave of coins

Aluette is a game played in Brittany and the Vendée that comes with its own Spanish-suited deck. It retains many archaic features that are no longer found in most patterns like a six-pointed star on the Four of Coins or the Catholic Monarchs kissing on the Five of Coins. The clubs feature small arrow symbols and the knights are androgynous. The Ace of Coins has a large eagle like many Spanish decks found in Italy. It comes in decks of 48 cards. As of 2020, Grimaud, another subsidiary of Cartamundi's France Cartes, is the last manufacturer of this deck. Since 1998, Grimaud has added game hierarchy indices because the Aluette game does not rely on the face value of the cards.

Aluette Suits
Suit				
(United Kingdom)	Coins	Cups	Swords	Clubs
(Spain)	Oros	Copas	Espadas	Bastos
(France)	Denier	Coupe	Épée	Bâton

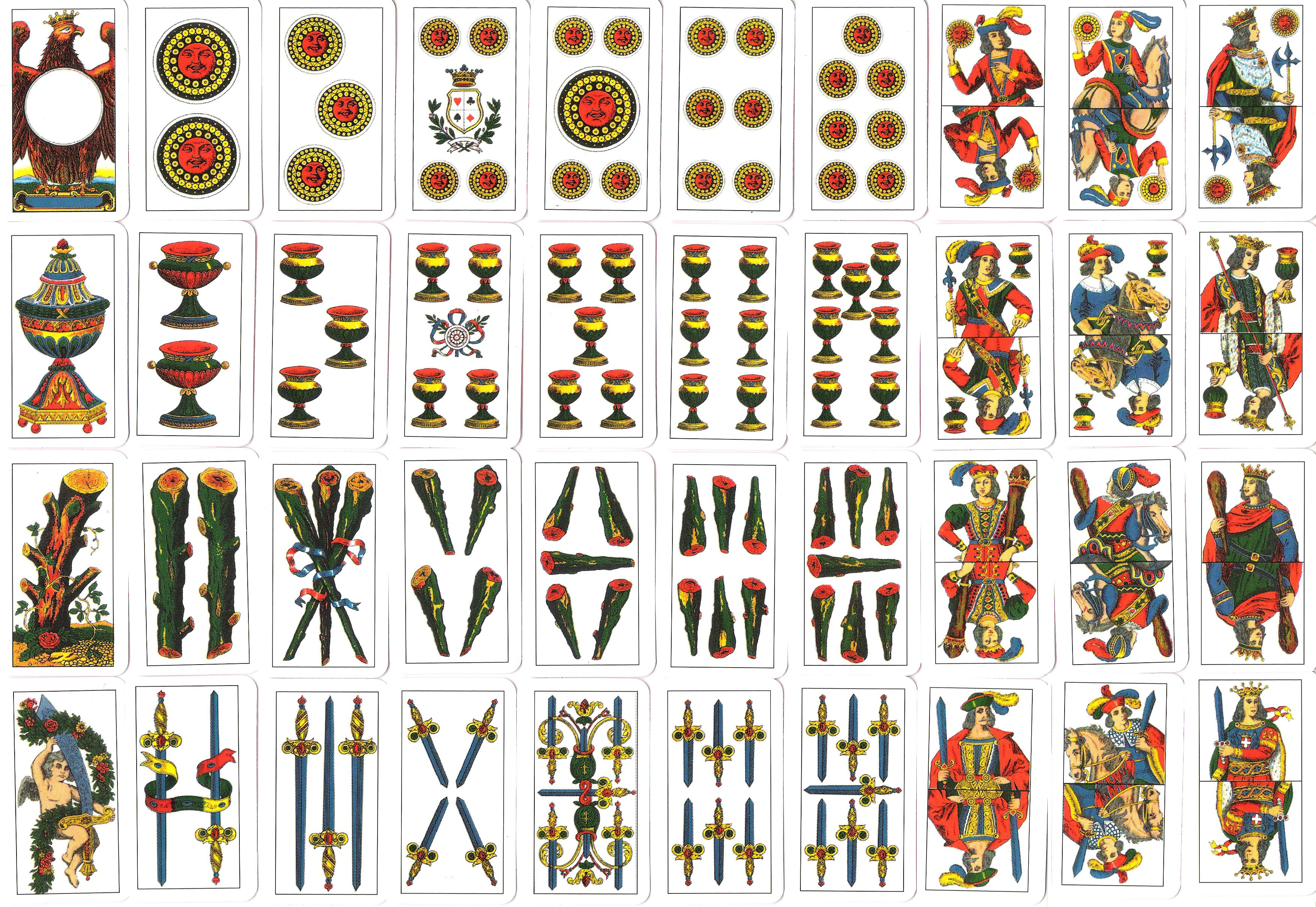
Piacentine deck

The Piacentine pattern is the northernmost of the Spanish-suited patterns found in Italy and along with the Neapolitan, one of the most popular. It is also the only pattern that is regularly sold with reversible face cards. Piacenza was ruled by Spanish Bourbons like in Sicily and Naples but the reason that the region has uses Spanish suits is because French occupying forces brought Aluette decks in the late 18th century. The earliest Piacentine cards were very similar to Aluette ones but developed into its current appearance by the late 19th century before becoming reversible by the mid-20th century. The Ace of Coins has an eagle similar to Aluette and Sicilian decks while the Ace of Swords is held by a cherub. Like all Spanish-suited patterns in Italy, they lack la pinta and come in 40-card decks.

Piacentine Suits
Suit				
(United Kingdom)	Coins	Cups	Swords	Clubs
(Spain)	Oros	Copas	Espadas	Bastos
(Italy)	Denari	Coppe	Spade	Bastoni

Located at the northern edge of the Papal States and San Marino, the Romagnole pattern is another derivative of the Aluette deck but has remained irreversible. Its Ace of Coins is very bare, there is neither coin nor eagle like in the other patterns. Its aces of cups and swords resemble Piacentine ones.

Romagnole Suits
Suit				
(United Kingdom)	Coins	Cups	Swords	Clubs
(Spain)	Oros	Copas	Espadas	Bastos
(Italy)	Denari	Coppe	Spade	Bastoni

=== Madrid pattern ===
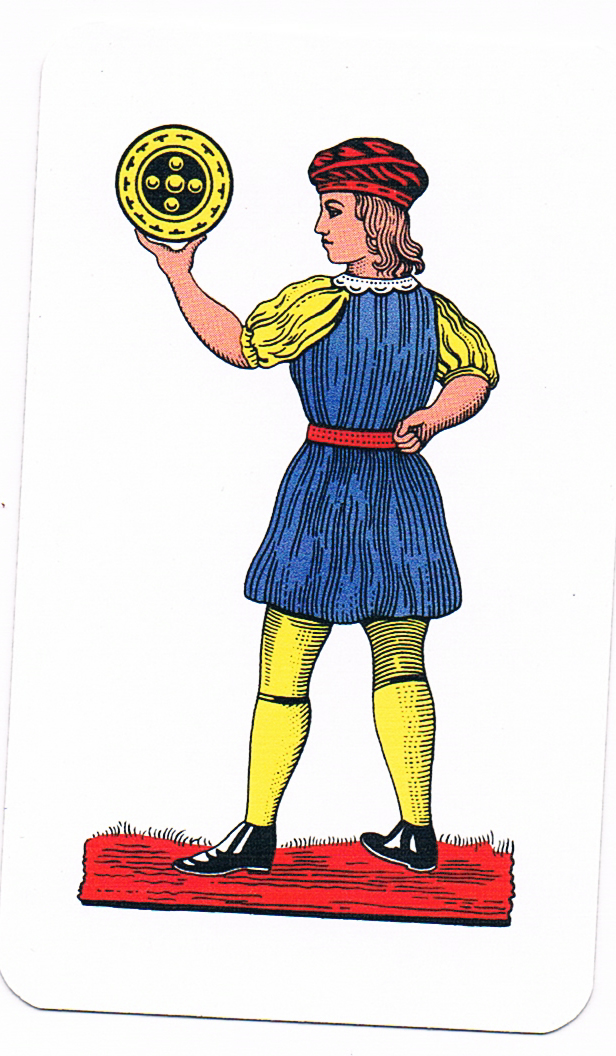
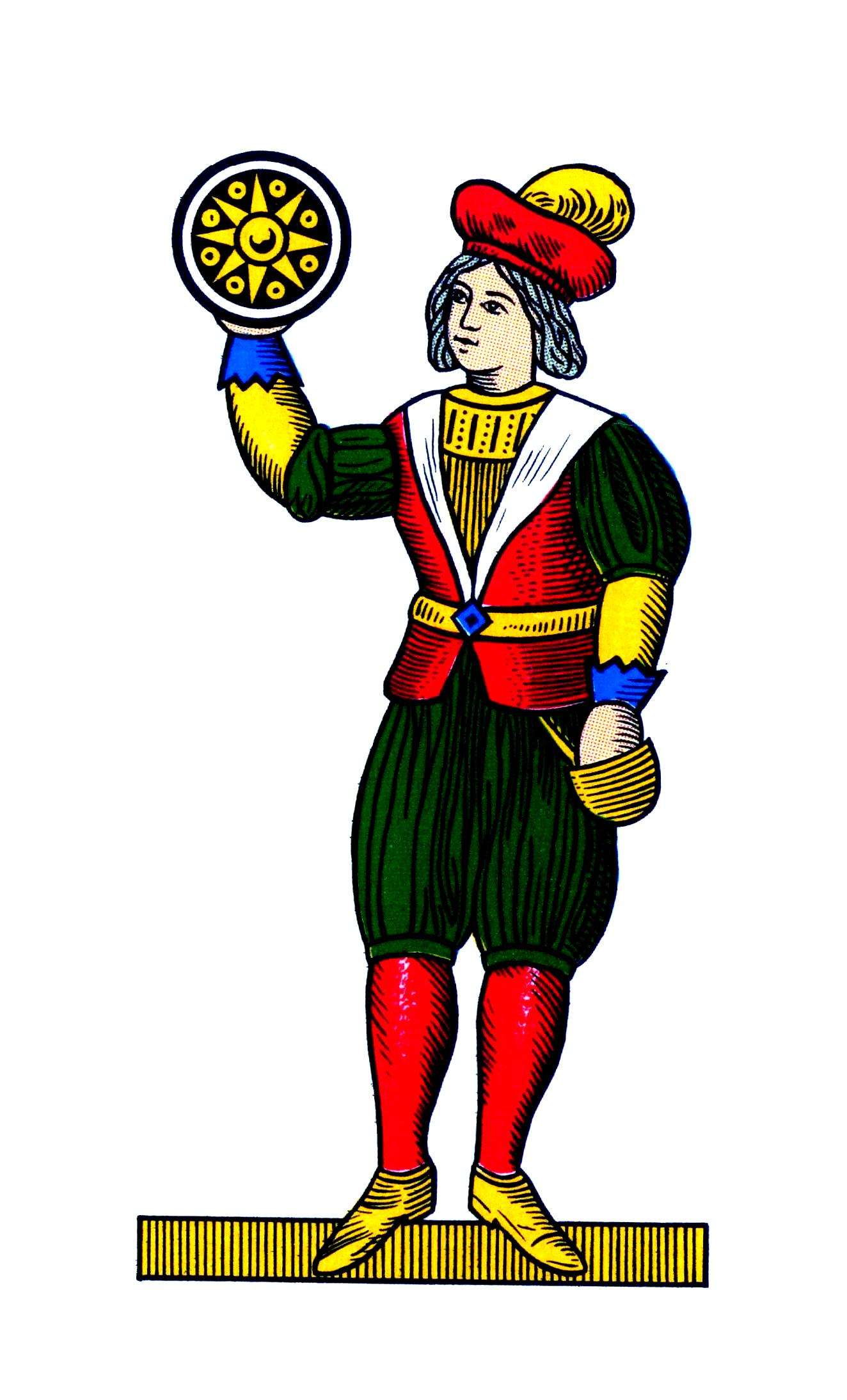
Sicilian (left) and Neapolitan (right) knaves of coins

The earliest known examples of the Madrid pattern are of French origin and it may be that it originated as an export to Spain that was adopted and manufactured in Madrid. While this pattern died out in the 18th century, it left descendants in Southern Italy where Spain had a lasting influence over the former Kingdoms of Naples and Sicily. The two interrelated patterns below were created during Spanish rule and replaced earlier Portuguese-suited playing cards. Both are descended from the extinct Madrid pattern. Depending on the manufacturer, the knaves may be female. These decks are also small, only slightly larger than the average Patience sized deck.

The Sicilian pattern originated as a crude copy of the Madrid pattern. These cards are also found in other parts of southern Italy where some players prefer them over the Neapolitan pattern. The Ace of Coins has a single-headed eagle. The 2s and 3s of the long suits intersect each other instead of just the 3 of Clubs. Many cards have small pictures to fill up the gaps between pips.

Sicilian Suits
Suit				
(United Kingdom)	Coins	Cups	Swords	Clubs
(Spain)	Oros	Copas	Espadas	Bastos
(Italy)	Denari	Coppe	Spade	Bastoni

The Neapolitan pattern retains less features of the Madrid pattern than its more conservative Sicilian sibling. It is the most widespread pattern in Italy. The Ace of Coins features a double-headed eagle and the Three of Clubs has a grotesque mask. The Neapolitan pattern is also produced in Argentina, which has a large diaspora population. The Argentine version contains 50 cards and la pinta.

Neapolitan Suits
Suit				
(United Kingdom)	Coins	Cups	Swords	Clubs
(Spain)	Oros	Copas	Espadas	Bastos
(Italy)	Denari	Coppe	Spade	Bastoni

=== Sardinian pattern ===
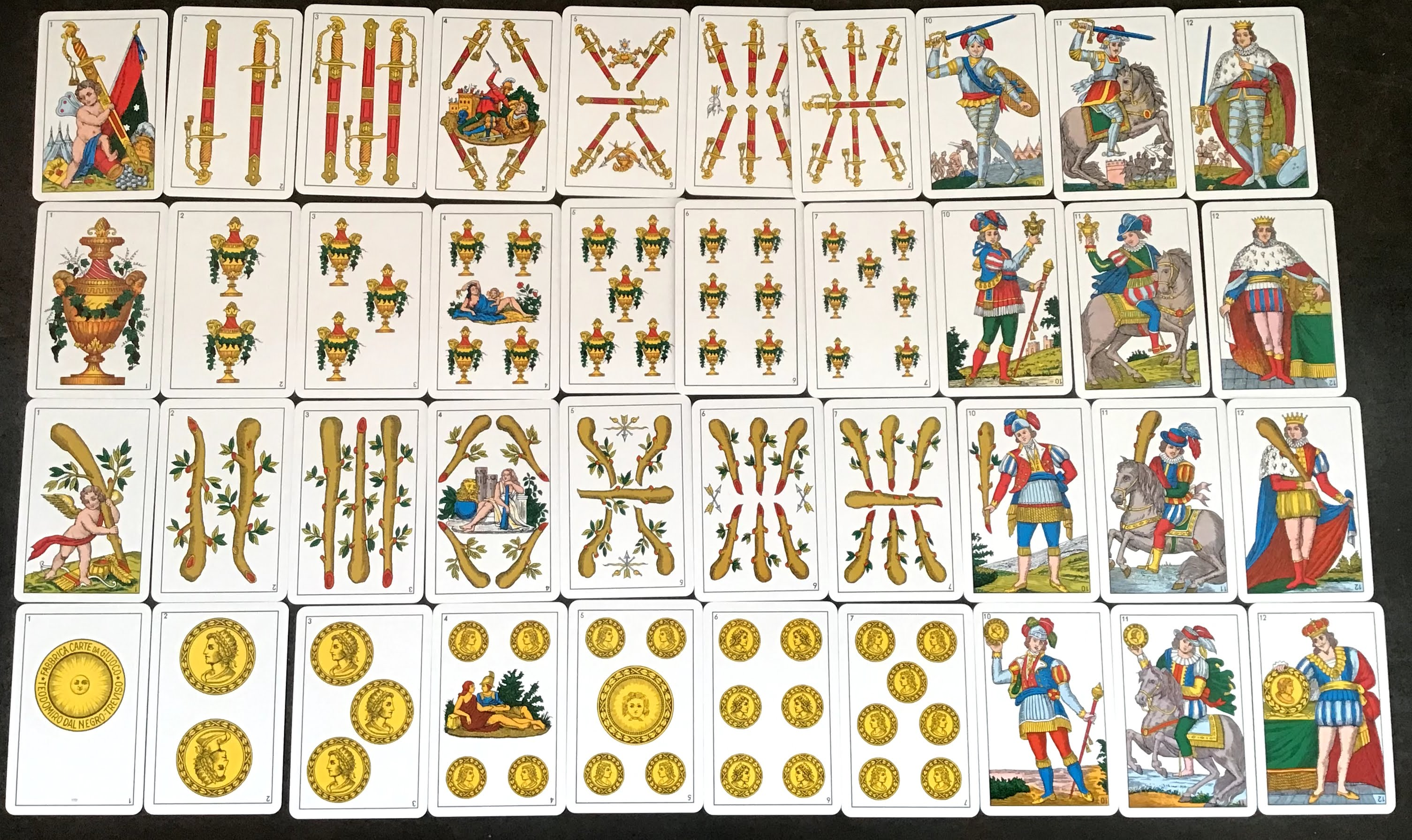
Sardinian pattern

Originally known as the Roxas pattern, the Sardinian pattern was designed by José Martinez de Castro in Madrid for Clemente Roxas in 1810. It became popular in Sardinia where it has been adopted as the local standard. The most notable feature are the scenes found in the fours of each suit. The coins also feature faces like the Castilian pattern. The 3 of Clubs does not have intersecting pips. This is the only Spanish-suited pack in Italy to have numeric indices.

Sardinian Suits
Suit				
(United Kingdom)	Coins	Cups	Swords	Clubs
(Spain)	Oros	Copas	Espadas	Bastos
(Italy)	Denari	Coppe	Spade	Bastoni

== Games ==
Games that traditionally use Spanish-suited cards include:

- Trick-taking:
  - Aluette
  - Botifarra
  - Brisca, popular Spanish game, similar to Italian Briscola
  - Julepe
  - Manilla
  - Ombre, the classic game that introduced the concept of bidding
  - Pocha or Mona, a variation of oh hell
  - Triunfo, ancestor of ombre
  - Truc (or truco)
  - Tute
- Fishing:
  - Cuarenta, the national card game of Ecuador
  - Escoba
  - Ronda, from Morocco
- Draw-and-discard:
  - Chinchón
  - Conquian, earliest Western rummy game
  - Panguingue, Filipino and Mexican game similar to Conquian
  - Cuajo, Filipino adaptation of the Four Color Cards game using a deck of 112 cards
- Other:
  - Burro, an inflation game
  - Cinquillo, a layout game
  - Mus, a very popular and highly regarded vying game
  - Siete y media, very similar to blackjack
