= Swords (suit) =

Suit in playing cards

- Symbol from Trentine pattern
- Native names: Italian: Spade; Japanese: イス; Portuguese: Espadas; Spanish: Espadas
- Decks: Spanish-suited playing cards; Italian-suited playing cards; Portuguese-suited playing cards
- Invented: 15th century

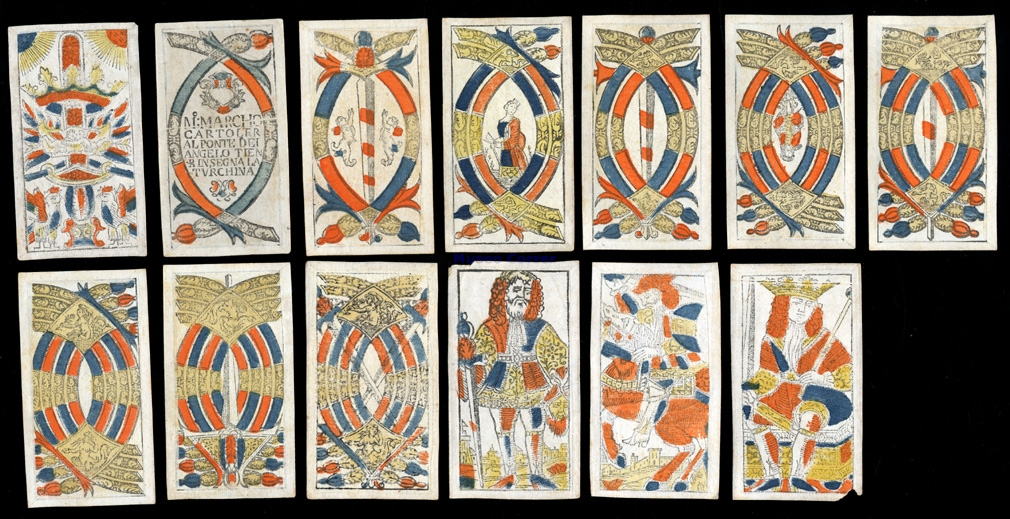
The suit of swords from an 18th-century Venetian pack

The suit of swords is one of the four card suits used in Latin-suited playing cards alongside coins, cups and batons. These suits are used in Spanish, Italian and some tarot card packs.

Symbol on Italian pattern cards: Symbol on Spanish pattern cards: Symbol on French Aluette Spanish pattern cards:

== Characteristics ==
The suit of swords is believed to have derived from Chinese money-suited cards' Tens of Myriads of Strings of cash coins suit. When the cards came into contact with the Islamic world, the Muslims adopted and renamed the suit of tens as swords. This may have been due to the Chinese numeral character for "ten" (十) being seen with one of its strokes elongated.

In Spain, the suit of swords is known as espadas and the court cards are known as the rey (king), caballo (knight or cavalier) and sota (knave or valet). The Spanish play with packs of 40 or 48 cards. There are no tens and, in the shorter pack, the nines and eights are also dropped. Thus the suit of swords ranks: R C S (9 8) 7 6 5 4 3 2 1. In Italy the suit is known as spade and the corresponding court cards are the re, cavallo and fante. Either 40 or 52-card packs are used. In the shorter packs, the tens, nines and eights are removed. Card ranking is thus: R C F (10 9 8) 7 6 5 4 3 2 1.

The interpretation and arrangement of the pips helps to subdivide the Latin-suit systems:

- Italian-suited: Intersecting long and curved swords
- Spanish-suited: Non-intersecting short and straight swords
- Portuguese-suited: Intersecting long and straight swords
- An archaic system (Note: Probably associated with the Duchy of Ferrara and likely abandoned after the 15th century.): Non-intersecting long and curved swords. Accomplished by having the swords curved inward

Portuguese-suited playing cards were traded to Japan in the mid-16th century which influenced the development of Karuta where the 48-card Komatsufuda and 75-card Unsun Karuta decks still maintain this suit.

== Gallery ==
=== Spanish pattern ===
The gallery below shows a suit of swords from a Spanish-suited deck of 48 cards. The pack is of the Castilian pattern:

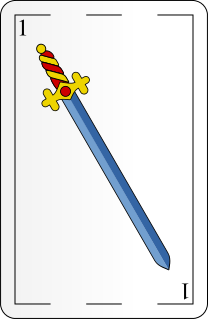
Ace

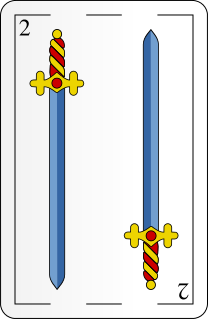
2

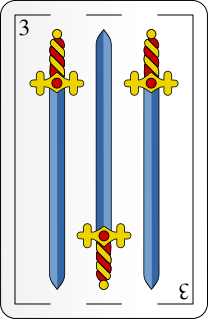
3

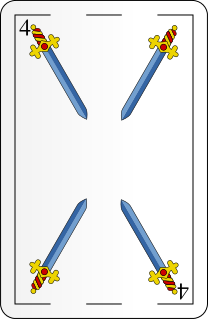
4

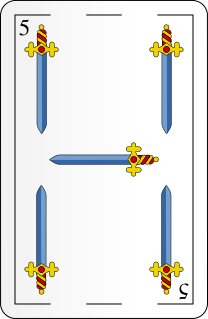
5

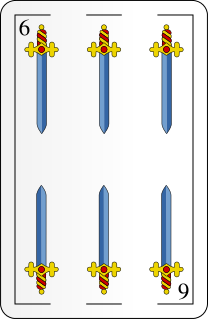
6

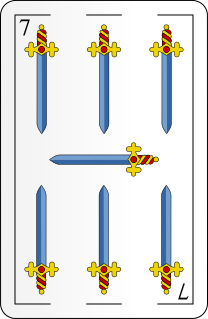
7

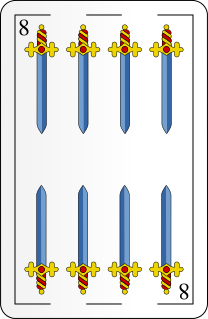
8

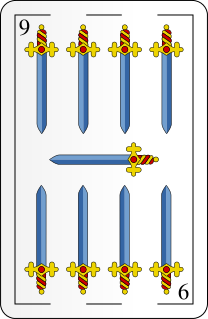
9

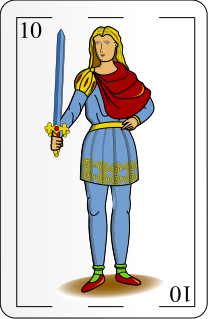
Sota

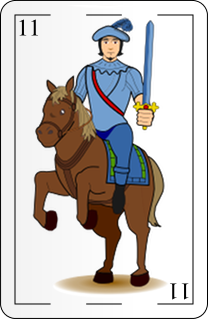
Caballo

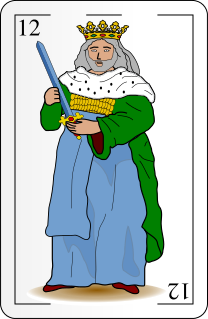
Rey

=== Italian pattern ===
The gallery below shows a suit of swords from an Italian-suited deck of 52 cards. The pack is of the Bresciane pattern:

Ace

2

3

4

5

6

7

8

9

10

Fante

Cavallo

Re

=== Komatsufuda pattern ===
The image below shows a suit of swords from a Komatsufuda deck of 48 cards:

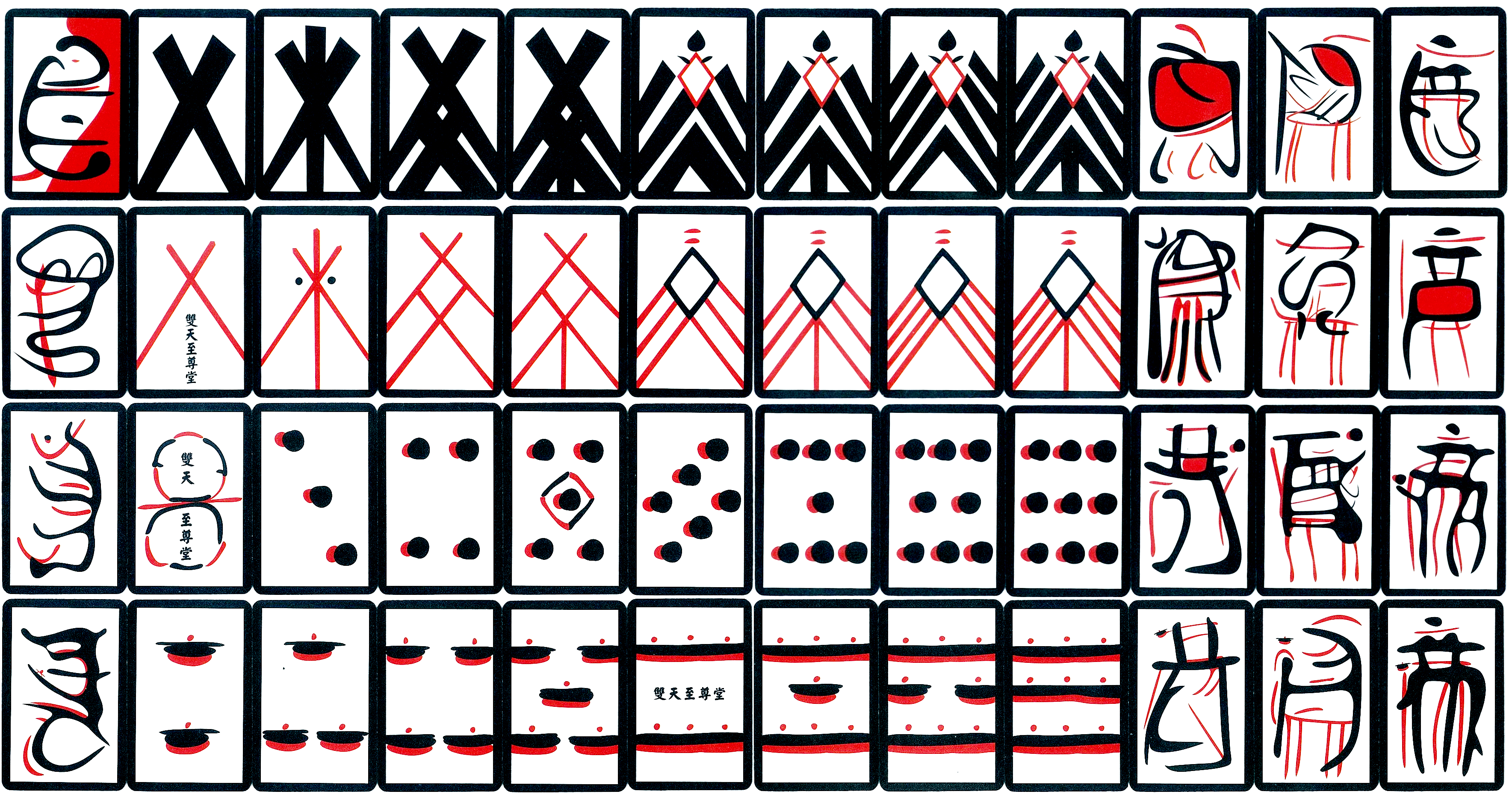
Ace, 2, 3, 4, 5, 6, 7, 8, 9, Knave, Knight, King

=== Unsun karuta pattern ===
The image below shows a suit of swords from an Unsun karuta deck of 75 cards:

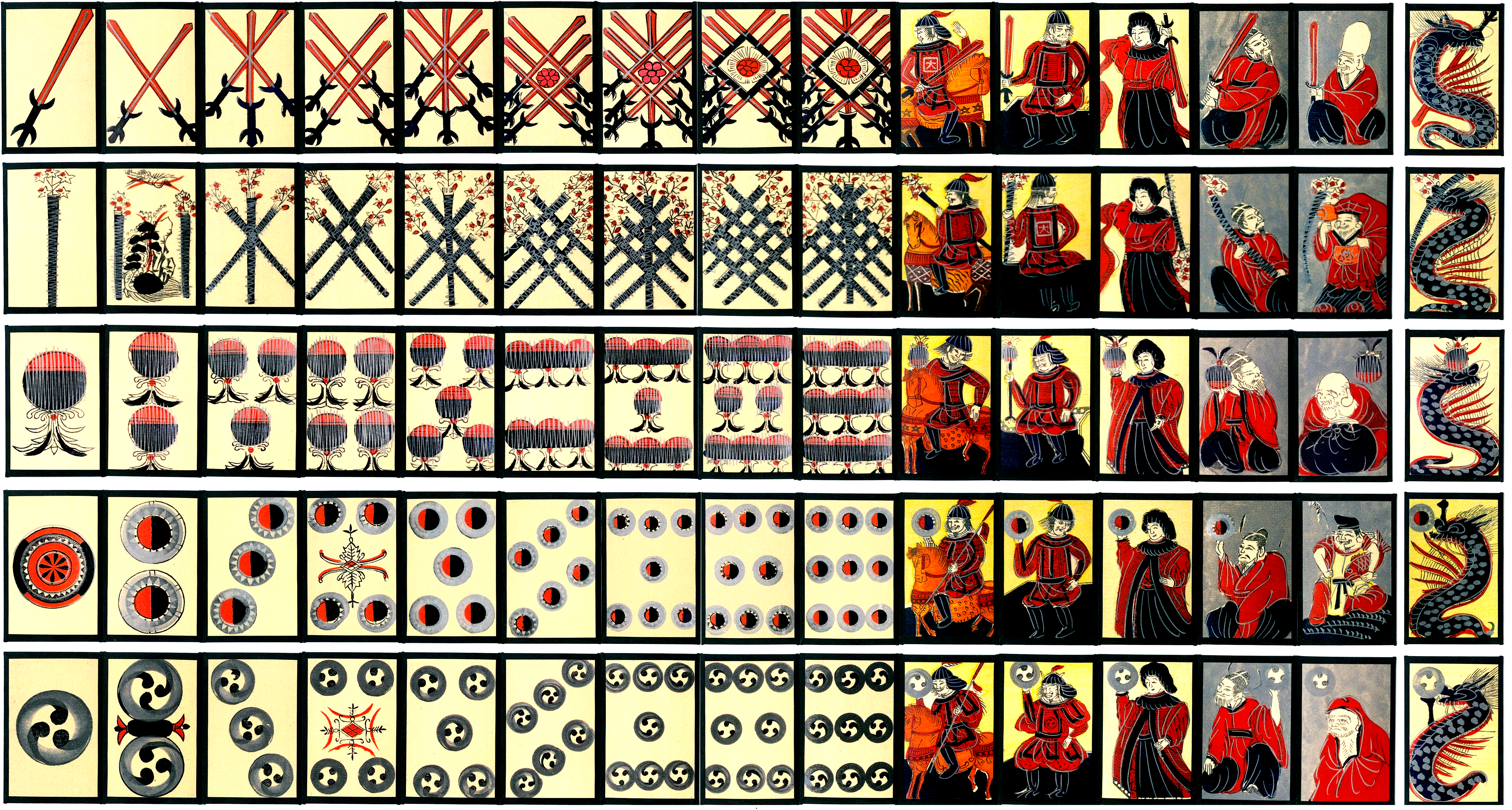
Ace, 2, 3, 4, 5, 6, 7, 8, 9, Knight, King, Female Knave, Sun, Un, Dragon

== Individual cards ==
- Seven of swords. In scopa, the seven of swords, along with the other suit sevens, is the highest-scoring card in the bonus of primiera.

== Tarot ==
The suit of swords in some tarot packs is one of several suits used in cartomancy.

== See also ==
- Spanish playing cards
- Italian playing cards
- Suit of swords – suit used in divinatory tarot cards

== Literature ==
- Parlett, David (2008). The Penguin Book of Card Games. London: Penguin. ISBN 978-0-141-03787-5.
