= Cups (suit) =

Playing card suit

- Symbol from Trentine pattern
- Native names: Italian: Coppe; Japanese: コツ; Portuguese: Copas; Spanish: Copas
- Decks: Spanish-suited playing cards; Italian-suited playing cards; Portuguese-suited playing cards
- Invented: 15th century

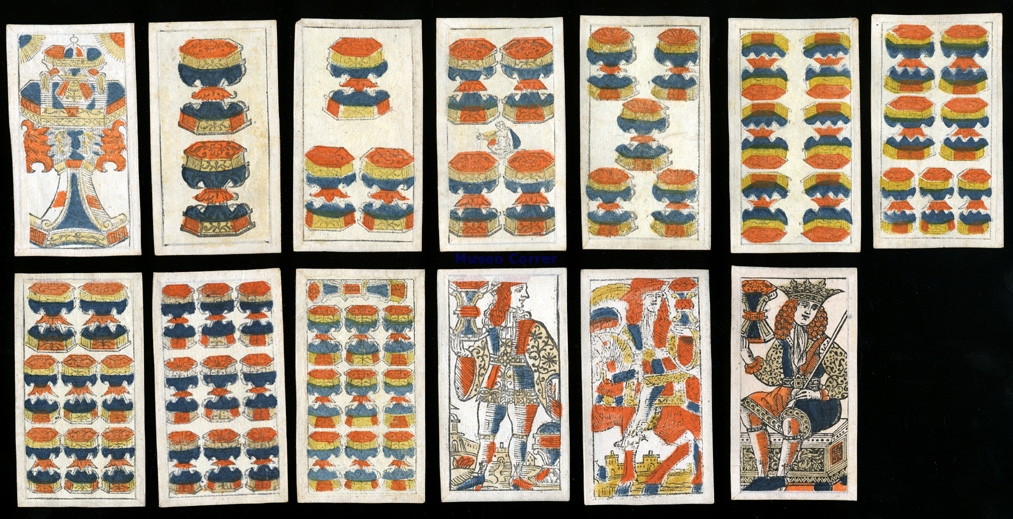
The suit of cups from an 18th-century Venetian pack

The suit of cups is one of the four card suits used in Latin-suited playing cards alongside coins, swords and batons. These suits are used in Spanish, Italian and some tarot card packs.

Symbol on Italian pattern cards: Symbol on Spanish pattern cards: Symbol on French Aluette Spanish pattern cards:

== Characteristics ==
The suit of cups is believed to have derived from Chinese money-suited cards' Myriads of Strings of cash coins suit. When the cards came into contact with the Islamic world, the Muslims adopted and renamed the suit of myriads as cups. This may have been due to the simplified Chinese character for "myriad" (万) being seen as upside-down. Mahjong maintains the myriad suit by using the traditional form of the character (萬).

In Spain, the suit of cups is known as copas and the court cards are known as the rey (king), caballo (knight or cavalier) and sota (knave or valet). The Spanish play with packs of 40 or 48 cards. There are no tens and, in the shorter pack, the nines and eights are also dropped. Thus the suit of cups ranks: R C S (9 8) 7 6 5 4 3 2 1. In Italy the suit is known as coppe and the corresponding court cards are the re, cavallo and fante. Either 40 or 52-card packs are used. In the shorter packs, the tens, nines and eights are removed. Card ranking is thus: R C F (10 9 8) 7 6 5 4 3 2 1.

In 1588, at the request of publisher Leonhardt Heussler in Nuremberg, Germany, the Swiss-German artist Jost Amman created a deck of cards where two of the four suits are cups. One set of cups are straight/cylindrical, more akin to drinking vessels. The other set of cups are round/spherical, more akin to pots. Like other early German decks, the 10 rank is represented by a Banner, and the court cards are the Unter, Ober, and King. Many of the cards feature fanciful illustrations demonstrating the artist's skill (a trend started by the Italian tarot).

Portuguese-suited playing cards were traded to Japan in the mid-16th century which influenced the development of Karuta where the 48-card Komatsufuda and 75-card Unsun Karuta decks still maintain this suit.

== Gallery ==
=== Spanish pattern ===
The gallery below shows a suit of cups from a Spanish-suited deck of 48 cards. The pack is of the Castilian pattern:

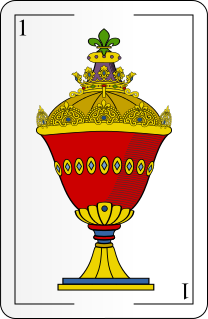
Ace

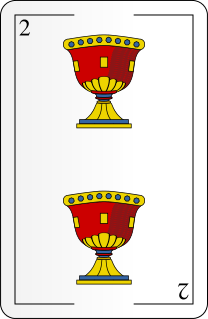
2

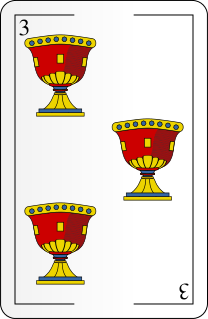
3

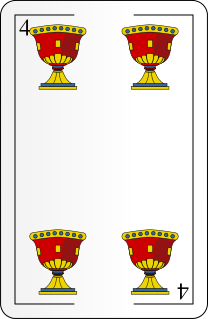
4

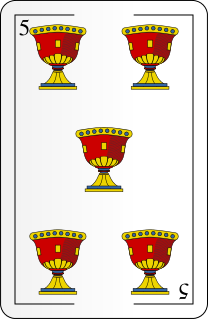
5

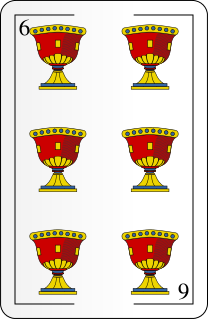
6

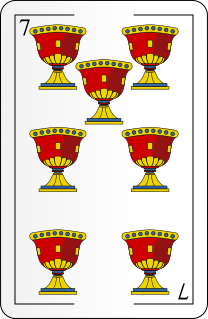
7

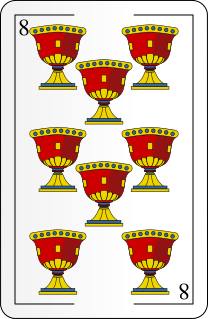
8

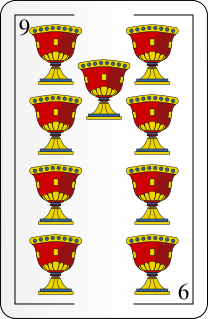
9

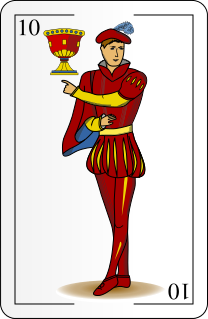
Sota

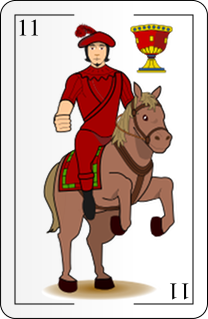
Caballo

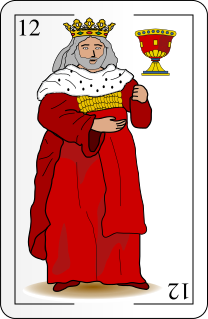
Rey

=== Italian pattern ===
The gallery below shows a suit of cups from an Italian-suited deck of 52 cards. The pack is of the Bresciane pattern:

Ace

2

3

4

5

6

7

8

9

10

Fante

Cavallo

Re

=== Komatsufuda pattern ===
The image below shows a suit of cups from a Komatsufuda deck of 48 cards:

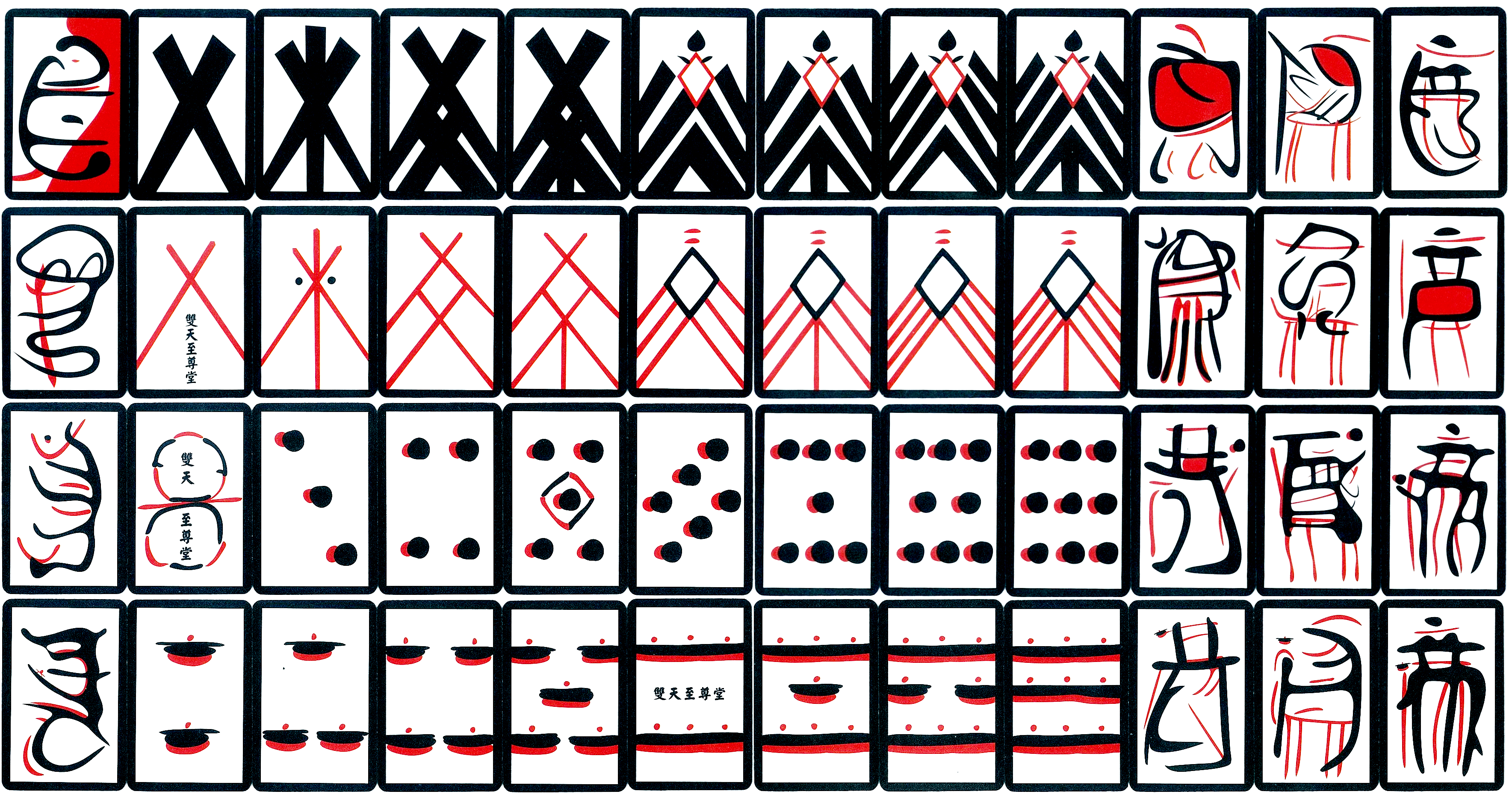
Ace, 2, 3, 4, 5, 6, 7, 8, 9, Knave, Knight, King

=== Unsun karuta pattern ===
The image below shows a suit of cups from an Unsun karuta deck of 75 cards:

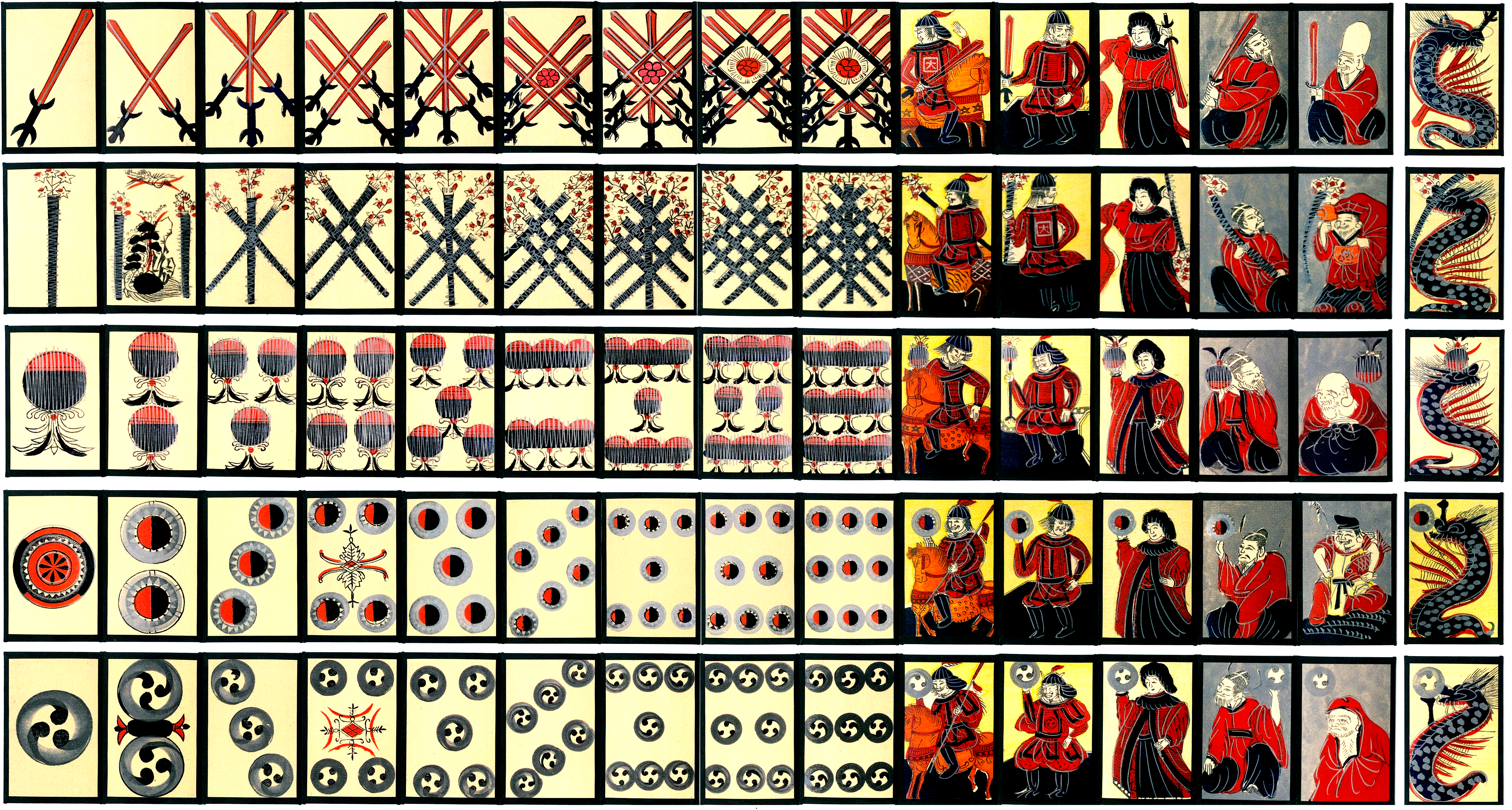
Ace, 2, 3, 4, 5, 6, 7, 8, 9, Knight, King, Female Knave, Sun, Un, Dragon

== Individual cards ==
- Seven of cups. In the game scopa, the seven of cups, along with the other suit sevens, is the highest-scoring card in the bonus of primiera.

The suit of goblets, also known as cups, is one of several suits of many tarot card packs used in tarot card readings and cartomancy.

== See also ==
- Spanish playing cards
- Italian playing cards
- Suit of goblets or cups – suit used in divinatory tarot cards

== Literature ==
- Parlett, David (2008). The Penguin book of card games. London: Penguin. ISBN 978-0-14-103787-5. OCLC 229463734.
