= Truc y Flou =

Card game

- Unusual and elaborate French game for six using Catalan pattern cards
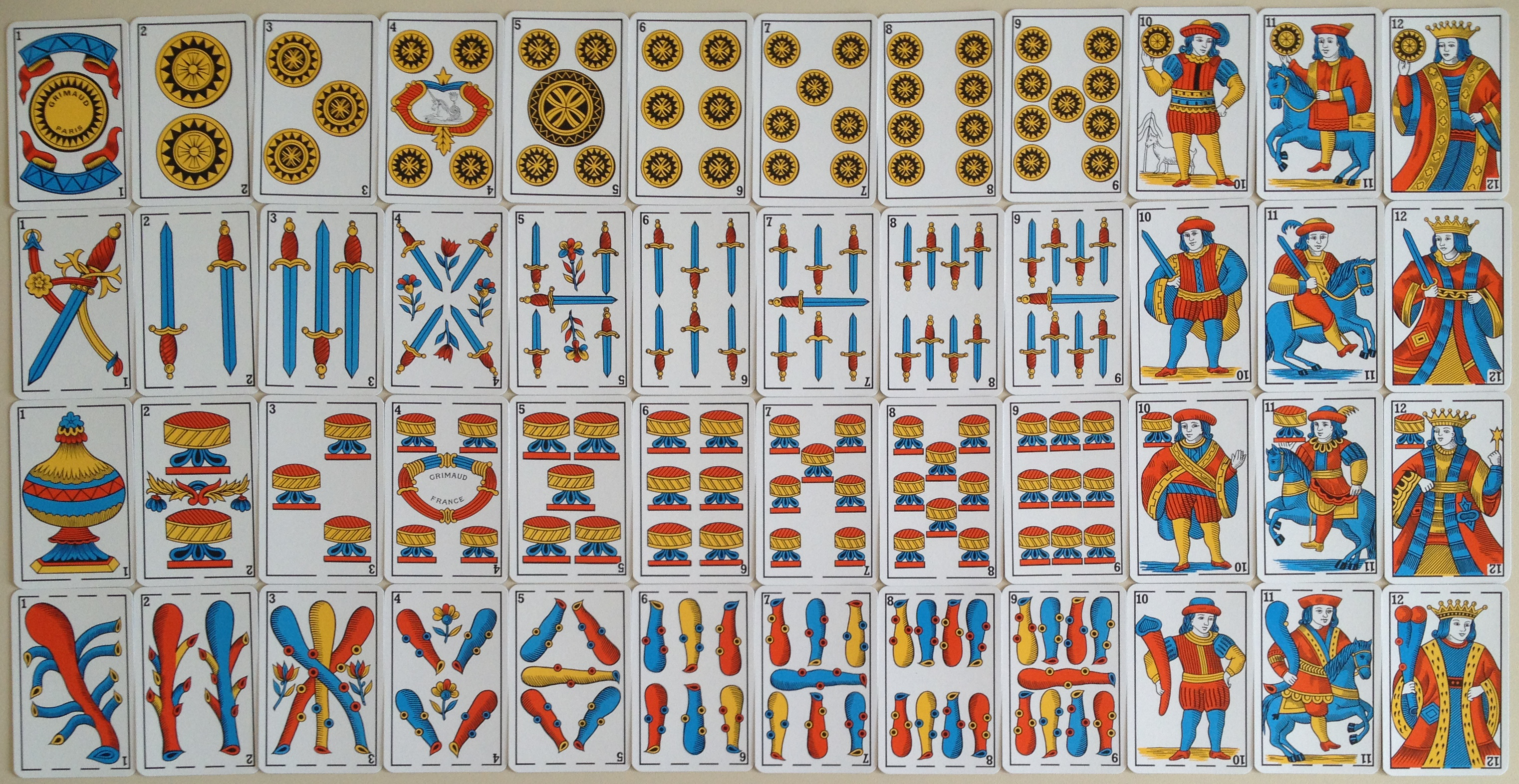
- Spanish National pattern cards
- Alternative name: Truc et Fleur, Truc y Flor, Truqueflor
- Type: Plain trick taking
- Family: Put group
- Players: 6
- Skills: Bidding, bluffing, captaincy
- Age range: 6+
- Cards: 40
- Deck: Spanish National/Old Catalan pattern

Related games
- Truc
- Signalling is part of the game

Truc y Flou is a card game originally from Aragon in Spain, which is nowadays played in the French Pyrenees in the Aure and Louron valleys in Hautes-Pyrénées and the Oueil valley near Luchonnais. It is part of the Put family and may be compared to the games of Aluette, Brisca and Mus. A significant and enjoyable part of the game is the communication and bluffing that is allowed between partners.

== Names ==
The name of the game is variously spelt Truc et Fleur, Truc y Flor or Truquiflor, as well as Truc y Flou.

== History ==
Playing cards were probably introduced to France via the routes through the Pyrenees as well as through ports on the Atlantic Ocean and Mediterranean Sea. In 1825, Catalan-pattern cards appeared, being manufactured by Dessouris and bore a strange resemblance to Truc cards. Catalan Truc resisted competition from other games such as Belote, Rummy, Bridge, Tarot and Poker. Truc y Flou itself originated in Spain where it had been practised since at least the early 19th century. (Note: Truc y Flor is recorded in a Spanish Catalan source in 1813 in Valencia.)

== Distribution ==
The game, which uses Spanish-suited cards, is played in the Central Pyrenees in the département of Hautes-Pyrénées up to the slopes of the Haute-Garonne. In Haute-Pyrénées, it is played only in the valley of the Aure and in the valley of the Oueil near Luchonnais. The same cards are used in the Upper Aragon in Spain to play Guignoté and the Basques play Mus with them. Truc y Flou tournaments have been held in recent years in places such as Saint-Lary-Soulan, Vielle-Aure, Bourisp, Guchan, Ens and Cadeilhan-Trachère.

According to David Parlett, Truc y Flor or Truquiflor is also played in South America alongside less elaborate varieties of Truc. It is known as the 'jolly singing game' because part of its very elaborate betting procedure traditionally involves announcing a flor by spontaneously singing a rhyming song the player makes up on the spot.

== Players ==
It is played by six players, divided into two teams of three. Each team has a captain (meneur de jeu) who sits in the middle, collects information from team mates and directs the tactics. The player who is last to play for the team is known as the 'foot' (pied). The foot may change depending on who wins the trick and leads next.

== Equipment ==
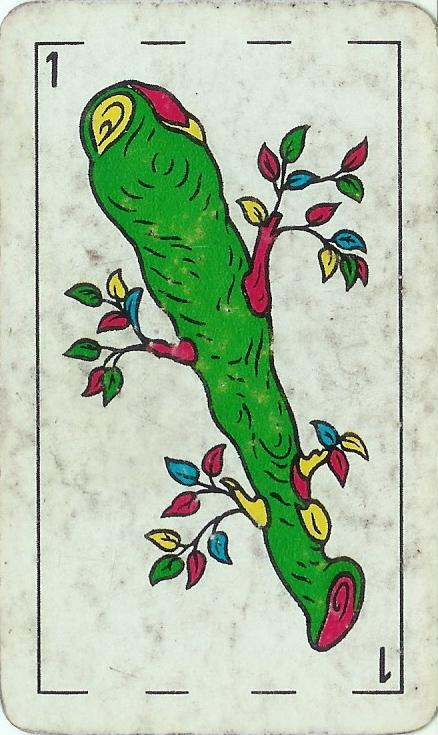
"The Club", the second highest card in the game

=== Cards ===
The game uses a pack of Spanish-suited cards of the Spanish National or Old Catalan pattern. A simpler relative which is the French Catalan version of Truc and also played in French Catalonia uses packs of the French Catalan pattern, now only made by Ducale and which are descended from the old Spanish National type and probably emerged in the late 18th century. These may also be used for the game of Truc y Flou. The packs contain 48 cards from which the Eights and Nines are removed for this game, leaving 40 cards, divided into 4 suits: Swords (Epée or Aspade); Clubs (Bâton or Bastou); Coins (Soleil or Aurous); and Cups (Coupe or Copas).

=== Card ranking and values ===
Cards rank from the highest to lowest as shown in the table below. During the game, players use conventional signals to communicate information to their team mates about the highest cards. There are no signals for the lower cards, since they are of little value. The signals used are shown in the last column.

Truc y Flou: card ranking
Card	Name	Point value	Signal / Remarks
Ace of Swords	The Sword	0	Raise eyebrows
Ace of Clubs	The Club	0	Wink an eye
7 of Swords	Manille	7	Twitch lips to right
7 of Coins	Manille	7	Twitch lips to left
3s	Treys	3	Lower lip under upper
2s	Deuces	2	Puff of breath
Aces of Cups and Coins	The Pouts	0	
Kings		0	
Knights of Swords, Cups, Coins		0	
Jacks of Swords, Clubs, Cups		0	
7s of Clubs and Cups		7	
6s		6	
5s		5	
4s		4	
Jack of Coins, Knight of Clubs	Périques	7	Wild cards, usually "7s"

In declarations, pip cards are worth their face value in card points and court cards are worth nothing. The Jack (Sota) of Coins and the Knight (Cavall) of Clubs act as wild cards and are called the périques. So they are usually turned into 7s because, in declarations, this is the value of the highest cards in terms of card points.

=== Counters ===
There are 25 points in the game, which are tallied using counters, typically dried Tarbais beans and marker a called an espintou, which is worth 13 points to mark the half-way stage and facilitate counting. The espintou used to be any suitable object such as a matchstick, a ball of paper or a cork, but nowadays a coloured jeton, such as those used for the game of Belote, is typical.

== Rules ==
=== Aim ===
To be the first team to reach 25 points through declarations, trick-taking and the associated vying and bluffing.

=== Preliminaries ===
A player from each of the two teams draws a card from the pack. The team of the player who draws the lowest takes charge and decides whether they will deal first or may designate an opponent to deal first.

=== Deal ===
Deal and play are to the right (anticlockwise). The dealer shuffles the pack, offers it to youngest hand to cut and then deals three cards each beginning with eldest. The cards may be dealt individually or in packets of two, followed by a single card, or vice versa. They may even be dealt in packets of three, although this is sometimes frowned upon as it used to be disallowed. Having dealt, the dealer placed the pack to the right so that it is clear who dealt and who begins.

Each player now identifies the stronger cards (potential trick winners) held and communicates this discreetly to the team captain, who decides the strategy to follow. The captain will then make a discreet announcement using signals e.g. an embit (embide = "you may go").

=== Declarations ===
As players play to the first trick they have one opportunity to make a declaration. These are of two kinds: embit and flor. A player wishing to bid says j'embide ("I bid") for an embit or just "flor" for a flor. A player with no bid remains silent. If a flor is bid, embits no longer count.

==== Embit ====
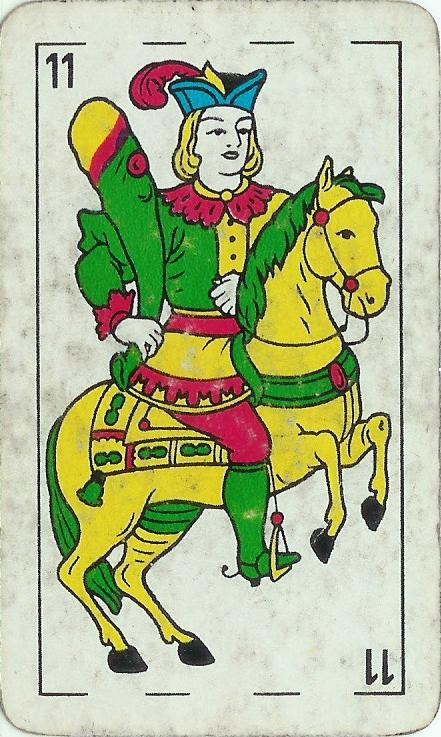
One of the 2 wild cards or périques, the Knight of Clubs

An embit is a pair of cards of the same suit held by a single player. Its value is the sum of the point values of the two cards plus a further 20 points. Thus a player holding a four and six scores 4 + 6 + 20 = 30 points. The maximum possible score is 34 points which is only possible if a player holds one of the two périques which are wild and may therefore represent a second 7. Thus a 7 and a périque score 7 + 7 + 20 = 34 points. In the event of a tie, whereby two opposing players score the same points, positional priority applies, i.e. the one nearest the dealer's right wins. (Note: In other words, counting anticlockwise from the dealer, the first of the two players to be counted.)

A player does not actually have to hold an embit to bid if, through signalling or instructions by the captain, the player knows a teammate has one. It is a common tactic for the pied to bid for the team.

To bid an embit a player says "j'embide". If this is not challenged, the bidding team score 1 point for it. However any subsequent member of the opposing team, in turn, may challenge it in one of two ways by saying:

- "Sing it" (cantar or chanter) in which case both teams declare their points and the higher scoring embit wins 2 points for its team.
- "Another one" (u aouté), "two more points" (dus de mes), "ten more points" (detz de mes) or "all the rest" (restou). "All the rest" means the remaining points the bidding team need to win the round. In response to any of these bids, the first team may fold and concede 2 points or accept the raise by saying "sing it" (cantar). If they accept, the card points are declared and the highest embit wins. The winners score 1 point for the initial embit plus the amount of the bid i.e. 1, 2 10 or the 'rest' respectively. Example: Team A has 18 and Team B 22. A bids "j'embide" and B, which only needs 3 to reach 25 and win the round, says "all the rest". If B wins, they score 3 and win the round. If A wins, they score 3 + 1 = 4 and advance to 22.

A confident player may open the bidding with "I'm bidding for all the rest" (mi falta embidou or mi falta) in which case the opposition can only fold and concede a point or say "sing it" and the highest embit wins. As before, if the bidding side win, they win the round; if their opponents win, they score 1 point plus the bidding team's shortfall.

An embit is nullified if anyone declares a flor.

==== Flor ====
A flor (French: fleur = "flower") is a flush of three cards of the same suit held by one player. So a player who has a 7-6-K scores 7 + 6 + 0 + 20 = 33. The maximum score is 41 points which is only possible if a player holds two périques and a 7 (7 + 7 + 7 + 20 = 41). In the event of a tie, positional priority again applies.

A flor is worth 3 game points. If two or three players on the same team declare a flor, it is worth 6 or 9 points respectively. If two opposing players have a flor, the first to speak says "flor" and the second may say "another flor" (flor tambien) on playing their first cards. Instead of declaring their point total, they then say "demi flor" on playing the subsequent cards and the scores are counted at the end. The higher total wins 3 game points.

An opponent may also challenge a flor by saying "better flor" (alimidou con flor); this of course could be a bluff. If the first player stays silent, the second player wins 3 points for the team regardless of whether the flor was, in fact, better. Alternatively the first player may challenge by saying "sing your better one" (alimidou cantar) and they compare flors. If the second team stays silent, the first scores 5 points. The first player could also raise further by saying "best flor" (alibarestou con flor). If the second player folds they concede 5 points; or they accept by repeating "best flor" whereupon the winners win the entire round with 25 points.

=== Play ===
From the information signalled by teammates, captains direct the play of their teams e.g. tilting the head from one side to the other means "let this trick go to the opponents".

Each player has 3 cards; hence up to three tricks can be played. A trick is won by the highest card played, but in the event of a tie, the trick is spoiled (pardes) and does not count. If each team takes one trick and the third is tied, the deal is won by the team that took the earlier trick. Winning the trick play is worth 1 game point. But this may be raised by vying. For example, if a team is confident of winning they may call "Truc!" (je truque). Their opponents may accepte with "yes", in which case the game is worth 2 points, or fold with "no" and concede 1 point to the bidding team. Alternatively they can raise it to 3 points with "Retruc!" (arrétruque). Further bids of "playing for 4" (balou quatro), "playing for six" (balou seiz) may be made alternately. The highest bid is "playing for the round" (balou Partido). At any stage a bid may be rejected ("no"), in which the last bidder wins and scores the existing level of points. A bid may be accepted ("yes") without any further escalation in which case the deal is played at the new level. Or the bid may be raised further (except in response to "playing for the round"), in which case the other team has the same 3 options.

A team with a high cards and a good embit make even announce "Truc and the rest" (restou y troucou). This means they are betting all the remaining points they need for the round with their embit as well as bidding a Truc. Their opponents must now fold, conceding 1 point to the bidders or call for the bidders to "sing" their embit. Whoever has the higher embit then wins the round.

During play, the two top cards earn bonus points when they are played to a trick: 2 points for "the Sword" and 1 for "the Club".

=== Winning ===
The first team to 25 game points wins the round (manche). Teams usually play for the best of 3 rounds. If the first two rounds are tied, the third is a decider called the Belle.

== Literature ==
_ (1813). Conversacio entre Sento, Tito y Quelo de Payporta. Valencia: Francisco Brusola.

- Parlett, David (2008), The Penguin Book of Card Games, London: Penguin, ISBN 978-0-141-03787-5
