= Aluette =

French card game

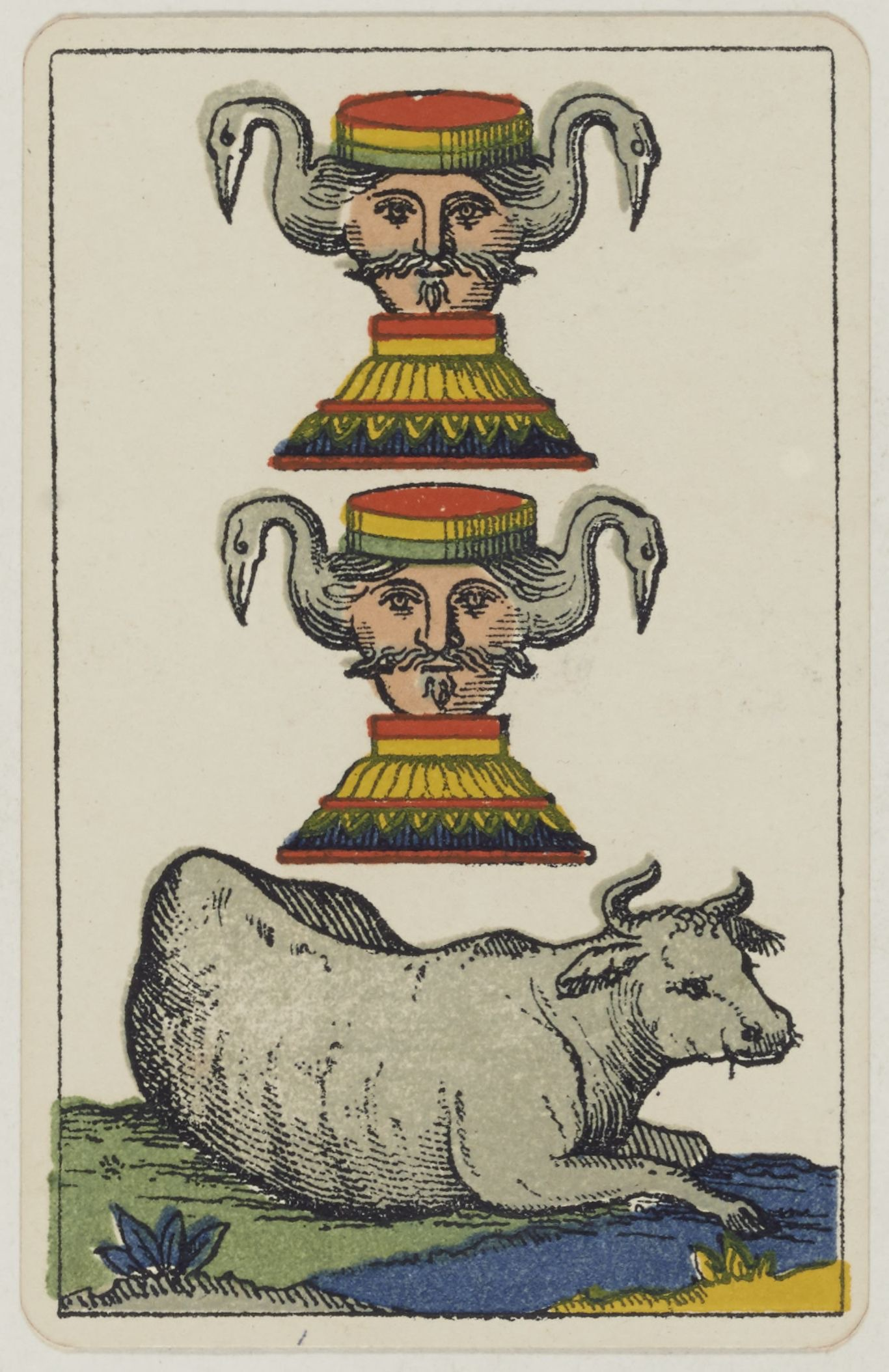
- 2 of Cups (La Vache) from a 19th-century deck
- Origin: France
- Alternative names: Luette, La Vache
- Type: Trick-taking
- Players: 4 or 6
- Skills: Tactics, Strategy
- Cards: 48
- Deck: Spanish (modified)
- Play: Clockwise
- Playing time: 45 min.
- Chance: Moderate

Related games
- Put • Truc • Truco

Aluette or Vache ("Cow") is an old, plain trick-taking card game that is played on the west coast of France. It is played by two teams, usually of four people, but sometimes also of six. It is unusual in using a unique pack of 48 Spanish playing cards and a system of signalling between playing partners. The French colloquial names for the game, jeu de la Vache or Vache, refer to the cow depicted on one of the cards.

== History ==
The game is very old, with references to the game of "luettes" by François Rabelais in the early 16th century. As the cards use Spanish suits, Aluette may even predate the invention of French playing cards around 1480. "La luette" means uvula in French and may refer to the fact that it is played with codified signs that allow team members to provide information on their cards during the game. The game is also called "la vache" (the cow) because of the illustration on the 2 of cups card. Due to similarities it has with the game of truc, aluette may have been imported by Spanish merchants. The cow had appeared on Spanish-suited cards made in France by around 1500 as evinced by a surviving pack made by Antoine de Logiriera of Toulouse dating to the period 1484–1512. The cow was portrayed on the 2 of Cups and, later, also on the 2 of Coins; one 18th century pack depict it on the Ace of Swords. By the early 19th century, it had settled on the 2 of Cups.

== Distribution ==
Aluette was traditionally played in rural and coastal areas in France between the estuaries of the Gironde and the Loire, that is to say, in the western part of the language area of the Saintongeais and Poitevin dialects, especially in its centre, in the department of the Vendée and in the Pays de Retz as far as Saint-Nazaire, as well as in Brittany. It was also played on the overseas islands of Saint Pierre and Miquelon near Canada.

Aluette was played as a family game, in tournaments, in clubs and very commonly in cafés until the 1960s. At that time, it was still played around the Brière and in the Guérande peninsula. It was also played a lot in the ports of Cotentin, where it has now died out.

According to a 1973 map by Alain Bourvo the game was then still regularly played in the coastal region between the Garonne and Loire rivers, including the area around Nantes, La Roche-sur-Yon and La Rochelle, as well as in the Loire valley between Angers and Tours; and the coastal strips around Cherbourg, Saint-Brieuc and Vannes. It was still occasionally played along other parts of the Normandy coastline and Cotentin (the Cherbourg peninsula). In the 19th century it may have been played up the Garonne as far as Bordeaux and up the Loire valley to Orleans and beyond as well as along the whole of the coastline from the Gironde estuary to the east side of the Cotentin. There was also a coastal region much further south around Biarritz and St-Jean-de-Luz that played the game. This region is part of the Basque Country which straddles France and Spain and is where Truc is played, a game that appears to be related to Aluette.

== Cards ==
Aluette cards, early 19th century
3 of cups (Madame)	2 of coins (le Borgne)
Ace of swords	5 of coins (Bise-dur)

Aluette uses a unique deck of 48 Spanish-suited playing cards where certain pip cards depict figures to show that they outrank their face value. The modern cards are based on those made in Thiers in the Auvergne until the 17th century for the Spanish market. The Spanish suit signs are Coins, Cups, Batons (Note: Although they look more like clubs, English sources follow the French and call them batons.) and Swords. These cards are attested in Frances in the 17th and 18th centuries, when French cardmarkers, especially from Thiers, exported them to Spain via Nantes. After 1700, cardmakers also set up manufacturing in Nantes.

There are 48 cards numbered from 1 (Ace) to 9, Valet (Jack), Cavalier (Queen), (Note: Parlett (2008), pp. 131–133, calls them Cavaliers; McLeod at pagat.com calls them Cavalières, presumably because they portray female figures.) and King. The design of the cards had a long evolution that was not fixed until the beginning of the 19th century. The strongest cards in the game (the Luettes, Deuces and Aces) as well as a few low cards have characteristic portraits and symbols, which mean that the pack is specific to the rules of the game and is therefore sold under this name. However, nothing prohibits playing a Spanish game if the cards are sufficiently well known to the players. And, in a pinch, one could play with a pack of French-suited cards by removing the 10s and agreeing on a correspondence between suits.

The figures on the cards give rise to their nicknames and are associated with certain gestures players pass to their teammate. The cards rank as follows:

The Luettes or Aluettes:

1. 3 The Master (Monsieur) - look upwards
2. 3 The Mistress (Madame) - tilt head to the side
3. 2 The One-Eye, The Blind Man (Le borgne) - wink
4. 2 The Cow (La vache) - pout a "moo"

The Doubles or Double Aces:

5. 9 Big Nine (Grand Neuf) - show the thumb
6. 9 Little Nine (Petit Neuf) - show the little finger
7. 2 The Oak (Deux de chêne, lit. "2 of Oak") - show the index finger with or without middle finger
8. 2 The Writing (Deux d'écrit, lit. " 2 of Writing") - mime writing

The Picture Cards (Figures):

9. A A A A Ace (As) - open your mouth
10. R R R R King (Roi)
11. C C C C Cavalier (Chevalier)
12. V V V V Jack (Valet)

The Low Cards (Bigailles):

13. 9 9
14. 8 8 8 8
15. 7 7 7 7
16. 6 6 6 6
17. 5 5 5 5
18. 4 4 4 4
19. 3 3

Within the Figures and Bigailles the suits have no order of precedence. For example, all Aces are of equal value and beat all Kings, etc. The 5 depicts a couple kissing (believed to represent the Catholic Monarchs), and the traditional signal is to "kiss hard", but it has no special value.

Many of the illustrations on Aluette decks appeared in other early Spanish packs but have since disappeared, like the six-pointed stars on the Four of Coins.

Grimaud, a subsidiary of Cartamundi's France Cartes, is the only producer of Aluette decks at present. Since 1998, cards have included the nicknames, hinting gestures, and game-ranking indices on their cards.

== Rules ==
The origin of the rules of the Aluette remains unknown. There are two different hypotheses:

- Aluette came from Spain and was introduced into France by Spanish sailors in the French ports of the west. It has never been recorded in the south-west of France and, if true, the game has disappeared from Spain without leaving a trace.
- Aluette originated in west France using the only pack of cards existing in the 16th century and it resisted the general conversion to French cards which took place in the 18th century.

Aluette's rules have evolved over the centuries. The most basic feature is that it is a plain trick game without trumps, similar therefore to Battle. The use of facial expressions is the most visible feature of the game, but is not unique to Aluette. However, card games with very different rules use signalling, most of them very old. Notably Trut or Truc, a signalling game reported in the west of France from the 16th century, also known in Catalonia and South America (as Truco), shares the same mechanism and the same rule structure as Aluette, so these two games may have a common ancestor.

== Play ==
Four player game:

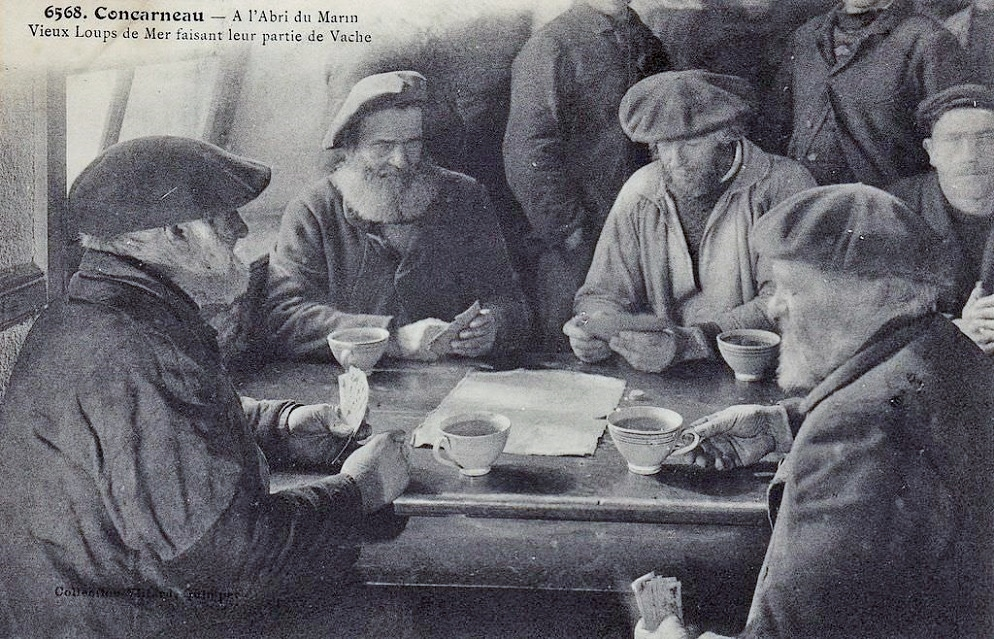
Aluette players. The caption reads: "At the sailor's shelter, old sea wolves playing their game of Vache"

The cards are dealt clockwise with each player receiving nine cards and twelve cards being left over. Alternatively, if all players agree, the remaining 12 cards can be dealt to the dealer and first hand (le premier en cartes), the player to the dealer's left. Each would then discard the six lowest cards in their hand. This is known as singing (chanter).

Each deal consists of nine tricks. The tricks taken are counted per person and not per team. At the end of the deal, the player who has taken the most tricks earns a point for the team. If two players have won the same number of tricks, the first to have reached the winning number of tricks wins the deal. First hand becomes the next dealer and starts the next deal. A game comprises five deals.

First hand leads to the first trick. Any card can be played but only the highest will win. If there is a tie, then the trick is 'spoiled' (pourri) and no one wins that trick. The player that wins the trick will lead to the next. If it is spoilt, the one who led, leads again. Players may only communicate to their partner using the signals and gestures described above.

=== Mordienne ===
A special rule in some regions is that any player who wins the last three tricks without having won the previous six, will win the deal and score 2 points. This is making mordienne. Players can signal their intention to make mordienne to their partner by biting their lips. Players who feel that they have a poor hand may raise their shoulders signalling to their partner that they should give up. Surrendering is an option as it will concede only one point to the opposition rather than two if mordienne is achieved.

== Suits ==
Suits Aluette
Suit				
(United Kingdom)	Swords	Cups	Coins	Clubs
(Spain)	Espadas	Copas	Oros	Bastos
(France)	Épée	Coupe	Denier	Bâton

The images below come from an Aluette pack published in the second half of the 19th century by cardmakers, Grimaud:

Aluette card deck- Grimaud - 1858-1890
	Ace	2	3	4	5	6	7	8	9	Valet	Cavalier	King
Batons												
Coins												
Swords												
Cups												

== Literature ==
=== Etymology and language ===
- Gautier, Michel and Dominique Gauvrit (1981). Une autre vendée chapter XXVIII, Éditions du Cercle d'Or, Les Sables d'Olonne (explanation of the numerous patois expressions used in the game)
- Rézeau, Pierre (1990). Dictionnaire du français régional de Poitou-Charentes et de Vendée, Paris: Éditions Bonneton.

=== Rules ===
- _ (1907). Revue du Bas-Poitou, Vol. XVIII, Fontenay le Comte.
- Aveline, Claude (1961). Le Code des jeux, Paris: Hachette.
- Simon, J.M. (1969). Règle du jeu de cartes d'aluette, Paris: Grimaud (rules in French accompanying the card pack).
- Borvo, Alain (1980). "Découvrez: l'aluette" in Jeux & Stratégie, No. 4, August–September 1980, pp. 22–25. English translation.
- Parlett, David (2008), "Aluette" in The Penguin Book of Card Games, London: Penguin, ISBN 978-0-141-03787-5, pp. 131–133. Rules in English.

=== Origins and evolution ===
- Borvo, Alain (1977). Anatomie d'un Jeu de Cartes: L'Aluette ou le Jeu de Vache. Nantes: Yves Vachon
- Borvo, Alain (1980). "Découvrez l'aluette" in Jeux & Stratégie, No. 4, August–September 1980, pp. 22–25. English translation.
- Lhôte, Jean-Marie (1996). Dictionnaire des jeux de société, Paris: Flammarion.
- Linden, Gérard (2007). La boule de fort par noms et par mots, Cheminement, pp. 12–15. ISBN 978-2-84478-546-6
- Simon, Jean-Pierre (2017). Les Jeux de la Loire, Orléans: Corsaire.
