= Trut =

Trut may refer to:

- Drude, in south Germany, a type of malevolent nocturnal spirit
- Truc, a 15th century card game from Occitania in France and the Basque region of Spain
