= Botifarra (card game) =

Traditional Catalan card game

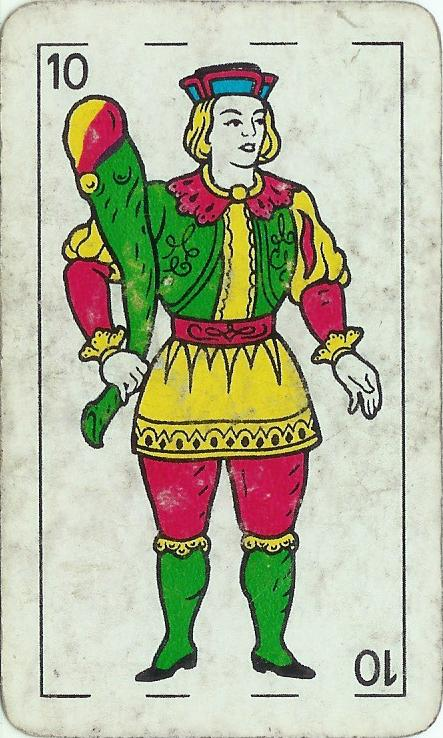
- The Spanish Knave of bastos
- Origin: Spain
- Type: Trick-taking
- Players: 2×2
- Skills: Tactics & Strategy
- Cards: 48
- Deck: Spanish
- Play: Counter-clockwise
- Playing time: 15 min.
- Chance: Medium

Related games
- Manille

Botifarra (Catalan pronunciation: [butiˈfarə]) is a point trick-taking card game for four players in fixed partnerships played in Catalonia, in the northeast of Spain, and parts of Aragon, the Balearic Islands and North of the Valencian Country. It is a historical game also played in many parts of Spain, not only in bars and coffee shops. The game is closely related to Manille from which it takes the mechanics, but its rules induce deduction and minimise the effects of luck.

== Object ==
Botifarra is a point trick card game in which the points in the tricks are most important, rather than the number of tricks, although a trick also has a value by itself. The game is played by four players who, forming pairs, sit opposite each other. The game is usually played for 101 points or more, and this requires several hands.

Botifarra is played with a Spanish 48-card deck whose suits are Coins, Cups, Swords, and Batons running from 1 to 12.

=== Point card values ===
The point value of each card is as follows:

- "Manilla" (9) = 5 points
- Ace (1) = 4 points
- King (12) = 3 points
- Knight (11) = 2 points
- Jack (10) = 1 point
- Pip cards (9-2) = 0 points

Within a suit, the order of the cards from highest to lowest is the following: 9, 1, 12, 11, 10, 8, 7, 6, 5, 4, 3, and 2.

In addition to the points for cards listed above, one point is awarded for every trick won. This means that, for every hand, 72 points are to be distributed amongst the two couples.

=== The game ===
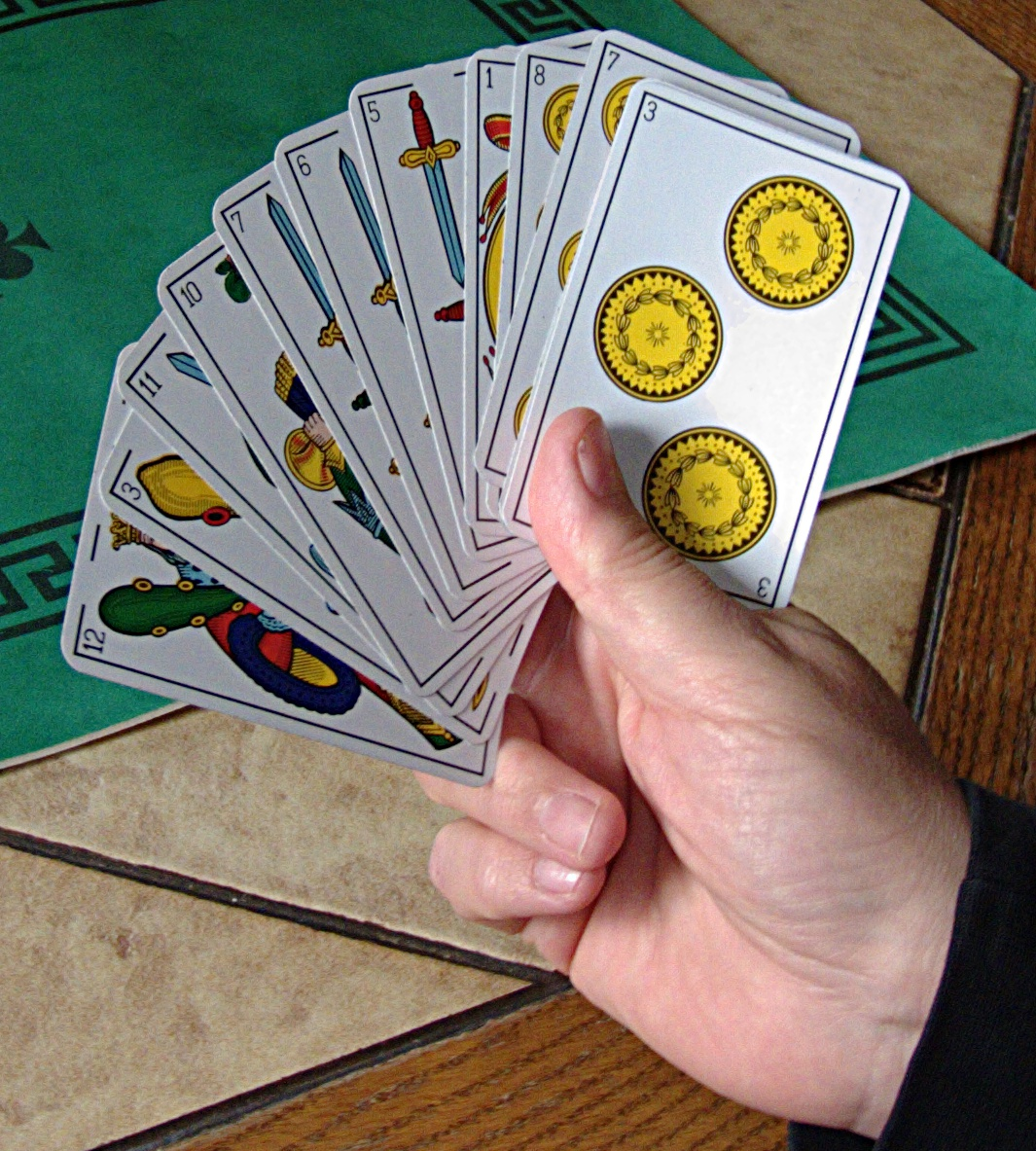
Botifarra cards in the hand

At the start of the game, a dealer is randomly selected. Usually, the dealer's left-hand opponent shuffles the deck, and the right-hand opponent cuts. The dealer then deals the whole deck counterclockwise in batches of four cards, starting with the player on his right. After playing each hand, the turn to deal and play always passes to the right.

After dealing, the dealer must choose a trump suit or "Botifarra" (no trump for this hand), or he may pass the privilege to his partner. If the dealer passes, the partner must choose a suit or Botifarra, for he cannot pass the right to choose again.

After the trump suit or Botifarra is selected, either of the defenders can double (Contrar) the hand score if they want to, and if doubled, either of the members of the dealer's team can redouble (Recontrar) the hand. If redoubled, the defenders can re-redouble (Sant Vicens) the contract.

When the hand in play is Botifarra, the score is doubled, and Contrar and Recontrar can double it further, so that there could be up to 4 doubles in any hand. The order in which the players have the opportunity to double is:

- Contro - the partnership that didn't make the trump choice can say "contro", doubling the score (or quadrupling it if botifarra was chosen)
- Recontro - if the hand has been "contrada", the partnership that selected trumps can say "recontro", which will quadruple the final score.
- Sant Vicens - this option can only be used by those who said "contro", if the opponents say "recontro" and Botifarra was not chosen.

=== The play ===
After dealing the cards, choosing the trump, and calling the bets, the hand can be played. The player to the right of the dealer plays first. Next, the remaining players will play in a counter-clockwise manner until the trick is complete. The couple that wins the trick must pick it up and store it face down in front of one of the members of each team, and they can not be consulted, except for the last trick played.

The rules to play the cards are the following:

- Any card may be played at the start of a trick. The selected suit is known as "coll de sortida".
- For the rest of the players, the rules go as follows:
  - If the tack comes from the partner (the card played by the partner is winning the tack):
    - A card of the same suit must be played if possible. The card does not need to be higher than the one winning the tack.
    - If they have no card of the same suit, any card may be played.
  - If the tack comes from an opponent (the card played by the opposing couple is winning the tack):
    - A card of the same suit must be played if possible, and the tack must be won if possible.
    - If no cards of the same suit remain but the player has a card that will win the tack (a trump), it must be played.
    - If no cards of the same suit or winning cards remain, the player will play any card.

Each trick is won by the highest trump played or, if no trump is played, by the highest card played of the lead suit, or if a no-trump contract is played, by the highest card of the leading suit. The winner of each trick then leads to the next.

=== Scoring points ===
The points scored by each partnership are counted, and the team that won the hand will then record the corresponding number of points that go above 36 (half of the maximum score). These points will be multiplied by two, four, or eight if a Contro, Recontro, or Sant Vicenç was called. If no trump was selected (Botifarra), the awarded points are also doubled. The player who dealt the cards and selected trumps in the previous hand will be responsible for shuffling the cards, the player to his left will cut the deck, and the player to his right will deal the cards and select trumps.

In some versions of the game, the cards are never shuffled at the start of each hand. The two piles of cards from the previous hand are simply placed on top of each other, and the deck is cut by the next player in order of play. This means that the cards will be distributed in such a way that the probability of acquiring a singular hand will be high.

=== Penalties ===
A revoke is penalised by the loss of all the points won so far during the play. The opponents score 36 points in the case of a normal hand and 72 in a botifarra (NT) hand.

A misdeal leads to the start of a new hand, but is not penalised with any points. The player to the right of the person who misdealt then deals and makes the trump choice, thus making the initial dealer lose out on the option of selecting trumps himself.

=== Etiquette ===
When playing Botifarra you must also bear in mind that it is forbidden to speak, show your cards or make signs or comments that may reveal your cards or your opinion as to whether game decisions are good or bad. Despite this, it is quite normal to make some comments during the game, which adds to a more entertaining atmosphere.

== See also ==
- Truco
- Mus (card game)
