= Truco =

Card game

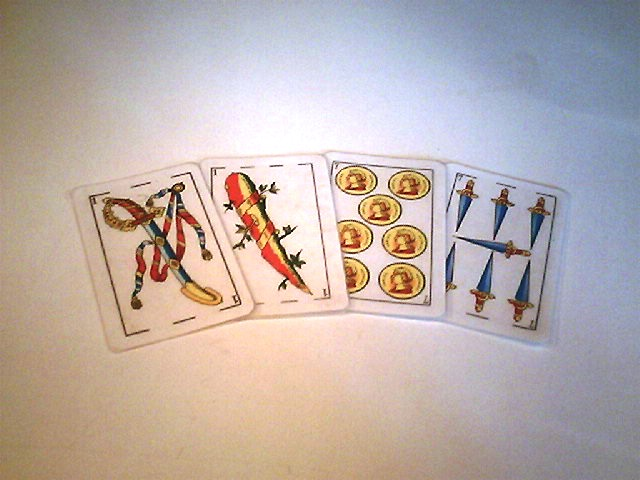
- The four top cards in Truco
- Origin: Spain
- Family: Trick-taking
- Players: 2, 4, or 6
- Skills: Tactics, Strategy
- Cards: 40
- Deck: Spanish, French (Some Brazilian variants)
- Play: Anticlockwise
- Playing time: 31 min.
- Chance: Medium

Related games
- Aluette • Put • Truc • Truc y Flou

Truco, a variant of Truc, is a trick-taking card game originally from Valencia and the Balearic Islands, popular in South America and Italy. It is usually played using a Spanish deck. Two people may play, or two teams of two or three players each.

== Card ranking ==
- Ace of Swords ("Espada" in Southeast of Brazil, "Espadão" in Southern Brazil, "Ancho de espada" in Argentina, "Macho" (male) in Paraguay, "Espadilla" in Uruguay)
- Ace of Clubs ("Hembra" (female) in Paraguay, "Ancho de basto" in Argentina, "Bastillo" in Uruguay, "Bastião" in Southern Brazil)
- 7 of Swords ("Siete de espadas", "Siete bravo" in Uruguay, "Manilha de espada" in South of Brazil)
- 7 of Coins (Siete de oros in Spanish or Sete ouro, Sete belo or Maneca de ouro in Portuguese, "Siete bello" in Uruguay)
- 3s
- 2s (known as "Perruchos" in Paraguay)
- Ace of cups and ace of coins (Anchos falsos in Spanish, Ás falso in Southeast of Brazil, Gueime in South of Brazil, "Buempes" in Paraguay, "Copon" and "Huevo frito" respectively in Uruguay)
- Kings (Reyes in Spanish and Reis in Portuguese) (12s)
- Knights (Caballos in Spanish) (11s)
- Jacks (Valetes in Brazil, Sotas in Argentina) (10s)
  (the face cards of King, Knight and Jack are called Cartas negras)
- 7 of clubs and 7 of cups (Sietes falsos in Spanish or Sete copa (seven of cups) in Portuguese, all cards from here down are considered "Cartas blancas")
- 6s
- 5s
- 4s (the 4 of clubs may be called Zap in the southeast of Brazil)

In southern and southeastern Brazil, the most popular variant, called Truco Paulista, uses dynamic card ranking. The ranks from the 3s and downwards remain the same, but the four trump cards, called manilhas, are decided by flipping one extra card up after dealing, called vira. The four cards conventionally ranked immediately above the flipped one (or, in the case of a flipped 3, the 4s) become the strongest cards. Their rank is as follows: clubs > cups > swords > coins. This variant is popular because it makes it harder to cheat and can potentially turn a bad hand into a great one once the card flips.

The Uruguayan version uses a "Muestra" each hand. The following cards of the same suit as the "Muestra" are ranked higher than the Ace of swords and are called "Piezas": 2, 4, 5, Knight, which in some regions is called Perico, worth 30 points, and the Jack, which in some regions is called Perica, worth 29 points. Finally, if any player has the King of the same suit as the "Muestra" and the "Muestra" is a "Pieza", the King becomes that card.

The Venezuelan version is similar to the Uruguayan version, exception that the "Piezas" 2, 4, and 5 are not used. The "Muestra", or "vira" as it is known in Venezuela is designated by turning over the top card of the deck after shuffle or optionally, the top card following the deal. "La Vira" is then placed beneath the deck at right angles to it so that it is visible during the hand. The suit of La Vira designates the suit of El Perico (the Knight) and La Perica (the Jack) which become the highest two cards in the game. The remaining three Knights and Jacks are ranked as initially specified.

== Mano (Mão) and Pie (Pé) ==
In Truco with four or six players, two concepts govern which player begins the round and who ends it. The mano in Spanish or mão in Portuguese ("hand") is the one that plays first and the pie in Spanish or pé in Portuguese ("foot"), the dealer, is the last to play. The hand is always the player on the right of the foot. The turn to deal is then passed counterclockwise, so the hand of the first round is the foot of the second and so on. If playing in teams, partners sit opposite each other.

They can also refer, when playing in teams of two, which player of the partnership plays before and which after. This has no significance in the game, as the playing is always done counterclockwise. But it has strategic significance since the foot of a team is traditionally considered the "captain" of the partnership that round.

If the game is tied (for example, if two opponents have the same points for envido), the hand wins. That advantage is offset by the fact that, as the last one to play, the foot plays with all their opponent's cards in sight. Also, the foot and the one sitting to the foot's left call envido in a game of four or more. Then, the hand is the first one to call his points for envido.

== Scoring ==
Players can earn points in three ways:

- Truco - winning in the playing of the cards (the "tricks").
- Envido - having the best combination of two cards of the same suit or a single card.
- Flor - having all three cards of the same suit.

The points won by a player are added to their team's score (when playing in teams). Any bet, win, loss, or surrender by a player also affects their partners. For this reason, partnerships are usually formed by mutual arrangement. As in bridge, it is not rare for partners to share information using already established signs and gestures. Communication is usually performed through these standard gestures. Arranging a secret set of gestures is frowned upon.

== Play ==
Each player is dealt three cards from a subset of the deck consisting of the numbers 1 to 7 and figures sota in Spanish or valete in Portuguese (jack, worth 10), caballo in Spanish or dama in Portuguese (equivalent to a queen, worth 11) and rey in Spanish or rei in Portuguese (king, worth 12).

The game may be played by two players. Two teams of two players may play; less commonly three teams of two can play. The players sit so that play alternates from one team to the other.

The game is played until a team finishes a game with 30 points or more. The 30 points are commonly split into two halves, the lower half called malas in Spanish or ruins in Portuguese (bad) and the higher half called buenas in Spanish or boas in Portuguese (good). Therefore, a team with 8 points would be ocho malas or oito ruins (8 bad ones), and a team with 21 points would be seis buenas or seis boas (6 good ones). However, because both teams can score points in one round, it is possible (but rare) for both teams to go over 30 points in one round. Usually as soon as one team goes over 30 points, the game is ended, to prevent a tie. However, sometimes the winner is the one with more points, otherwise another hand is played, until the tie is broken.

Each type of scoring can be bid on to score more points. Bids can be accepted, rejected or upped. Bluffing and deception are fundamental strategies.

Each round has three tricks. The mano leads to the first trick by playing one card. Then, counterclockwise, each other player plays one card. The player with the highest card wins the trick. The cards remain face-up on the table during the round. Sometimes the highest cards tie. If these tied cards were played by the same team, that team wins the trick. Otherwise, the trick is called a draw, parda. The same mano then leads the next trick.

Winning two of three tricks wins a round, equivalent to one point. If one team wins the first two tricks, the third is not played. But if one of the games ends in a parda, the team that won the earlier of the other two tricks wins the round (e.g. If trick 1 was won by A, trick 2 was won by B, and trick 3 was a draw, A wins the round for having won the earlier trick). That concept is often referred to as "primera vale doble" (first is worth double) If trick 1 is drawn and trick 2 is won by B, the winner of the round is B and a third trick is not played). In the case of two pardas (ties), the winner of the remaining trick wins the round. In case of three pardas, the mano wins the round. The winner of each round is the first to play the next card. If a round is tied, or "parda", the hand plays first.

During play, the teams have multiple opportunities to raise the stakes.

- Truco - Any player can call truco at any stage to increase the value of the round to 2 points for the winner team. The challenged team says quiero to accept or no quiero to refuse; if refused, the round ends with the calling team winning one point.
- Retruco - The team that answered quiero to the truco can call retruco to increase the value of the round to 3 points. It may be said immediately after truco or after accepting the bid. The other team must answer quiero or no quiero; if refused, the round ends with the calling team winning two points.
- Vale cuatro - The team that answered the retruco can say this immediately after the retruco or after accepting it. This makes the round worth the maximum possible four points; if refused, the round ends with the calling team winning three points.

Truco must be accepted explicitly if playing strictly by the rules: if truco is said, the only way to accept it is by saying quiero, but in a friendly game the players may accept an informal answer such as veo, dale. To call retruco immediately, it is necessary first to say quiero (and the same is true when calling vale cuatro). Instead of saying explicitly quiero, a player can play a card and it is implied that they accepted. So, for example, the dialogue must be truco/quiero retruco/quiero vale cuatro, with none of these words omitted.

A player can play his card face up or face down, in which case it does not count towards the score. A card can be played face down in order to prevent opponents from deducing the value of a remaining card, possible if envido or flor/contraflor has been played. If a player does not want his opponents to know his cards, which can be done in order to trick them into raising their bets, they can play their card face down. This is not the same as irse al mazo (going to the deck), accepting defeat without finishing the hand.

=== Envido ===
In games of two people, envido must be said before the player plays a card. In team games, the foot and the player to the left of the foot are the ones who say envido (when they do, there are already cards played).

Envido bids have precedence before Truco bids. If one team calls Truco and the other calls Envido, the Envido dialogue must be completed (accepting, increasing or declining it) before the Truco.

When Envido is said, the challenged team/player can answer in any of these ways:

- Quiero - accepts to take the bet.
- Envido - accepts the 2 points of the first Envido and proposes to raise the bet by 2 points.
- Real envido - accepts the 2 points of the first Envido and proposes to raise the bet by 3 points.
- Falta envido - if the loser of the bet scores less than 15 points (or is in the "malas" half), the winner will get as many points as the loser needs to get to 15 points, and if the loser of the bet scores more than 15 points, the winner gets as many points as the loser needs to get to 30 points.
- No quiero - refuses to take the last bet. Thus, the challenger team/player earns 1 point if no one raises, and the number of points that were accepted, plus the refuse point (e.g. Envido-Real Envido-No quiero is 3 worth points, and Envido-Envido-Real Envido-No quiero is worth 5 points).

For Real envido, the answers are the same, excepting Envido (because it would "lower" the bet). For Falta Envido, the answers are also the same as in Envido, excepting Envido and Real Envido (that leaves only Quiero and No quiero).

Unlike truco, Quiero and No quiero close the bidding, and Envido cannot be bid again. In the cases where the bidding is ended with Quiero, a comparison of the pairs (puntos de envido = "score of envido") is performed to see which team/player has the highest and wins the envido. To calculate the puntos de envido:

- The score of a pair of the same suit is the sum of the values of the cards + 20, with the face cards, Kings (12s), Knights (11s) and Sotas (10s), worth 0.
- If the player has no suit pair, then his puntos de envido is the value of his highest card, with Kings, Knights and Sotas worth 0.
- If playing without Flor, in case of having three cards of the same suit, the puntos de envido are those of the highest pair of the hand.
- A player is obliged to report his score correctly, even though that can be used later to deduce his cards. For example, if a player has already played a six of spades and they have 27 for envido, they are obliged to report the score correctly, although this reveals that they must hold the ace of spades. If the winner reports his score wrong, the points are given to the other team. The cards must be shown at or before the end of the hand.

The puntos de envido are told from the mano to the dealer player anticlockwise. A player can pass without stating their score if it is too low to win, thus avoiding revealing information about their cards. In case of a tie, the mano or the mano's team has preference. If any player says son buenas ("They're good") on behalf of the team they admit defeat without stating their score. It is usual that while telling the puntos de envido, the partner of the player with the highest envido remains silent unless the other team says a higher envido. Then, the silent player either raises or folds.

After finishing the truco, the winner of envido has to show his cards by placing them on the table and announcing "[the amount of the envido] en mesa", or, in Argentina "las [the amount of the envido] jugadas" meaning that the announced cards have been played. Failure to do so may be noted by the other team who then takes the points.

The envido is referred to in conversation as tanto, as saying envido always counts as a bid.

=== Flor ===
A Flor is three cards of the same suit in the hand. Any player with Flor must announce it or risk a penalty. The player with the best Flor wins 3 points for each Flor. A player without a Flor cannot announce one (on the contrary to Envido, where any player can announce it).

The call for Flor can only be made before playing the first card, by simply saying Flor. Then, any other player having Flor must announce his/her own (play is suspended, so players without Flores wait until the bet is over), going anticlockwise and by saying any of:

- Flor: A simple announcement. If nothing more is said, the team having the best Flor scores 3 points for each Flor announced this way or by an accepted ContraFlor (see below).
- Con Flor me achico: A player announces that they have Flor, but surrenders on behalf of the team. The Flor bet is closed and the opponent team scores 3 points for their Flores and 1 for the player's surrender.
- ContraFlor: A player announces Flor and challenges the opponent to answer (see below).
- ContraFlor al resto: A player announces Flor and proposes to raise the bet to the number of points the leading team needs to win the game plus 3 for each Flor.

After calling ContraFlor, the challenged team must answer:

- Con Flor quiero: the challenged team confirms that each Flor will be three points.
- Con Flor me achico: The same as above.
- ContraFlor al resto: See above.

After ContraFlor al resto, the answers are:

- Con Flor quiero: Accepts raising the bet to the number of points the leading team needs to win plus 3 per each Flor.
- Con Flor me achico: See above.

After the bet has been closed by saying con Flor quiero or con Flor me achico, players announce the Flores. The comparison between Flores is done as in Envido: the values of the three cards are added up plus 20 (Aces to 7 are worth the face value and Sotas, Knights and Kings, 0). When two Flores have the same suit, the one of that player playing earlier (counting anticlockwise) has precedence. If an earlier player announces a better Flor, it is usual to say son buenas, admitting defeat but without revealing information about their cards. At the end of the hand, the Flores must be shown.

As with all bets in Truco, each Flor (or surrender) is made on behalf of the team.

In Argentina, Truco is oftentimes played without Flor, called Sin Flor, or Sin Jardinera (without the gardenmaid).

==== Pedir Flor ====
This is a penalty for those players that, having a Flor, do not announce it. If a player suspects that another is hiding a Flor, he/she can challenge this player by saying Pido Flor. In the case that the player had actually a Flor, the challenger team earns three points. But, if the challenged player shows at least two different cards, his/her team earns one point.

== Tricks ==
Truco players trick their opponents:

- Playing fast and distracting them through constant conversation and jokes.
- Raising the stakes and bluffing.
- Asking questions with the words envido or truco while holding the cards (when holding cards, a player is active and can call a bet). For example, assuming players A and C form a team, and B and D the opposing team, Player A may bid envido and Player B may ask while being active -- "did he say envido?", which effectively raises the stakes. This may entice either A or C to quickly call "quiero", as they may have been fooled into thinking the raise was out of clumsiness and not really intended.
- When holding both a high and a low card, the low is placed in front of the high a and allowing an opponent to glimpse it, to convince them a truco is possible.

== Pica Pica ==
In a game of 6, sometimes Pica Pica is also played. Instead of two teams of three, opposing players pair up and play a game, adding the resulting points to their team's score. Usually Pica Pica is played every other game, but only if a team has 5 or more points, and no team has more than 20 (or 25). Pica Pica is also known as Punta y Hacha.

This is a way of finishing the game more quickly, because each pair in a pica pica plays a complete hand, with corresponding scores. Therefore, it is possible to have, for example, three vale cuatro in the same hand, which quickly raises scores. However, envidos and its raises are usually capped (usually 6 points).

== Truco in Brazil ==
Truco is popular in Brazil, with many regional variations. The most known versions (Truco Paulista and Truco Mineiro) use a French deck and different rules. Truco Paulista can be known as Ponto Acima in some regions.

Truco in Brazil is mostly associated with college culture and lifestyle. Students typically sit on a table to play while drinking alcoholic beverages. This scene has been featured in advertising campaigns and it was included in the program of every University "Olympic" Games around the country, known as Jogos Universitários. Truco can be played by two, three and even four people in each team, which is thought to make it more exciting.

Brazilian Truco has a maximum score of 12 points, values hands and cards differently (depending on where the game is played). It is common to use a best-of-three games system.

=== Truco Paulista ===
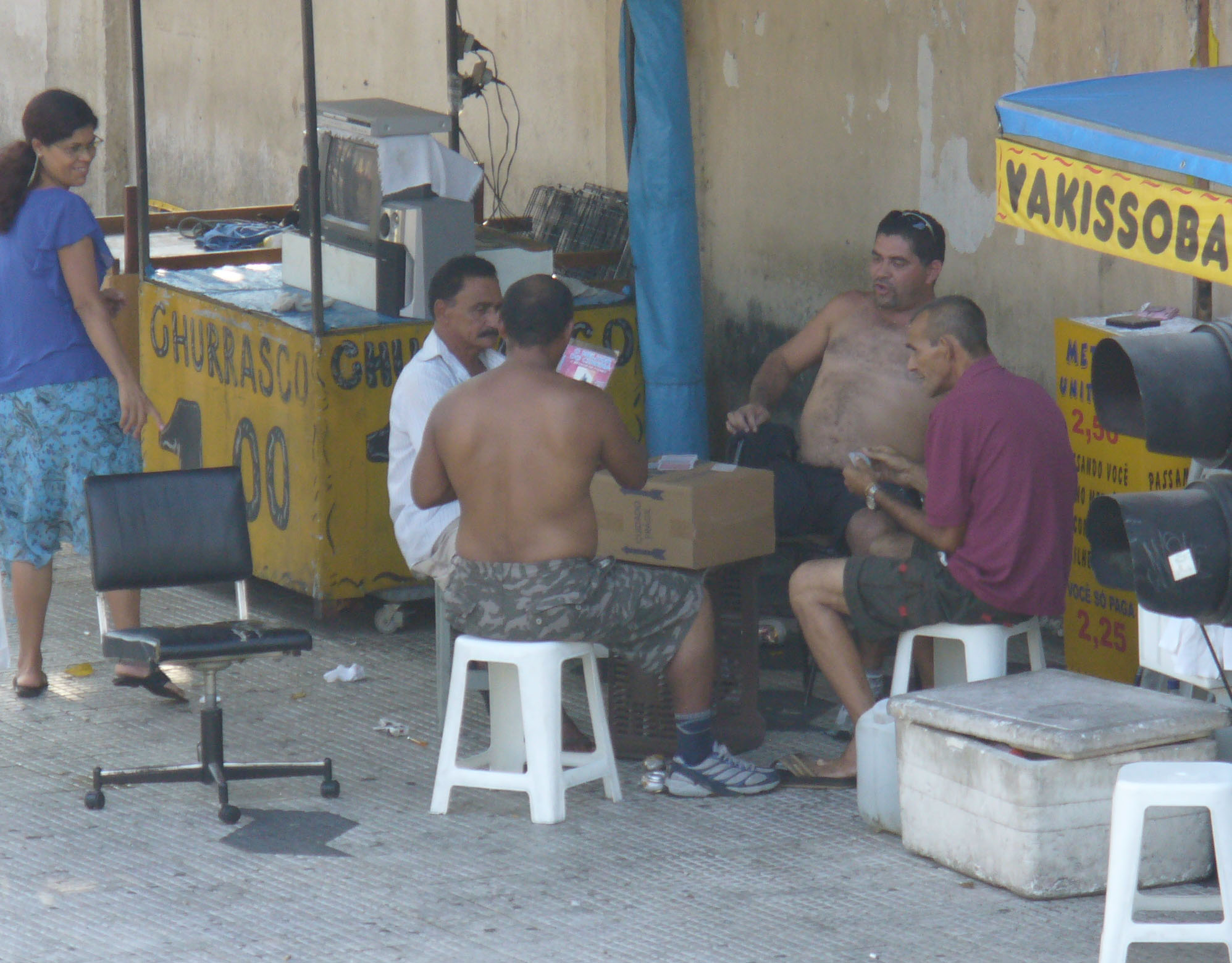
People playing Truco on the streets of São Paulo, Brazil.

Truco Paulista is a variety of Truco popular in Brazil, originally conceived in the state of São Paulo and is usually played between two teams of two players each. The game is won by the first team to reach 12 points. Each regular round is worth 1 point with some exceptions (see Pointing System).

One player is the first to shuffle and deal. The dealer is allowed to look at the faces of the cards before shuffling so as to be able to place certain cards at certain spots within the deck (e.g. placing the highest-ranking cards together). They are not allowed, however, to browse freely through the deck. After shuffling, the deck must be handed to the player to the left (the cortador), who can either reshuffle (without looking at the faces of the cards). cut it or do nothing. The deck (or the part of it chosen by the cortador) is then returned to the dealer who deals the cards from the top or bottom of the deck (this is chosen by the cortador). The cards must be dealt counter-clockwise, starting with the player to the dealer's right. They can be dealt one at a time or, most commonly, three at a time. If the cortador chooses not to reshuffle, they can deal their and their partner's cards in advance.

The players each play one card, starting with the player to the right of the dealer, the mão (hand) and ending with the dealer, called the pé (foot). The player who played the highest-ranked card wins the trick for the team and begins the subsequent trick.

The rounds consist of a best-of-three tricks. The team that wins two tricks wins the round and gets the point. If the first trick (or first and second tricks) ends in a tie, the winner of the next trick wins the round. If the second or third tricks end in a tie, the winner of the first trick wins the hand. In the rare occasion that all three tricks end in ties, nobody is awarded the point. In the case of a tie, the following trick is started by the player who tied the last trick.

==== Pointing System ====
At any point in Truco Paulista during the game any of the players can raise the stakes by saying truco. When a player asks for truco, the opposing team has three options:

- Accept: the round is now worth three (3) points;
- Fold: the team that asked for truco gets one point;
- Raise the stakes even further by asking for 6 (this can also be done later at any point if the team chooses to accept the truco).

If the team chooses to ask for 6, the round is now worth six points. The opposing team (the one who asked for truco) has the same three options:

- Accept: the round is now worth six points;
- Fold: the team that asked for 6 gets three points;
- Raise the stakes even further by asking for 9.

This system goes on in this same pattern, with the players raising the stakes further to game and finally match.

When one of the teams reaches 11 points, they play the mão-de-onze (round of eleven). In this round, the members of each team can see their partner's cards before the round begins and the team with eleven points may choose to play the round or run away. If they choose to play, the round is worth three points. If they choose to run away, the opposing team is awarded one point. If any of the players ask for truco during the round of eleven, the team loses the round. For this reason, if one of the players is dealt an unbeatable hand (having the two best cards at the same time) they may simply show the cards to the rest of the table and win the round without having to play. If both teams reach eleven points, the round must be played.

If one of the players receives fewer or more than three cards dealt by a member of the opposing team, they can point out this error after the round has begun and win the round. If the error is pointed out before the hand begins the deck must be shuffled and the cards dealt again.

In Truco Paulista the cards are ranked in the following order, from strongest to weakest:

- Trump cards;
- 3s
- 2s
- Aces
- Kings
- Jacks
- Queens
- 7s
- 6;
- 5s
- 4s

8s, 9s and 10s are never included. Upon agreement, the 7s, 6s, 5s, and 4s can be removed from the deck, this is called playing with a clean deck (jogar com baralho limpo).

After the cards are dealt, one card from the remainder of the deck is turned over to determine the trump cards (manilhas), which rank above all others. The trump cards are the cards directly above the one which was turned over (e.g. if the card revealed is a 7, the trump cards are the queens). The strength of a trump card when compared to the others is determined by its suit, with diamonds being the weakest, followed by spades, hearts and clubs being the strongest.

=== Truco Mineiro ===
Truco mineiro is a variety of Truco played mostly in the state of Minas Gerais. The rules are mostly the same as in Truco Paulista, except:

- Regular rounds are worth 2 points instead of 1;
- When a player asks for truco, they propose the round be worth 4 points; if refused, the team receives 2 points.
- When a player asks for 6, they propose the round be worth 8 points; if refused, the team receives 4 points;
- When a player asks for 9, they propose the round be worth 10 points; if refused, the team receives 8 points;

The round of eleven is replaced by the roughly similar round of ten, except that only the team with ten points is allowed to see each other's cards and that the round is worth four points instead of three. If both teams reach ten points the round must be played and they are not allowed to see each other's cards.

Truco mineiro uses a fixed set of trump cards, so there is no need to turn one card over after dealing to determine them (the order of the suits remain the same, however). The ranking of the cards is:

- 4 of clubs (known as zap)
- 7 of hearts
- Ace of spades (known as espadilha)
- 7 of diamonds (known as pica fumo or simply sete de ouros)
- 3s
- 2s
- Aces (except the ace of spades)
- Kings
- Jacks
- Queens
- 7s (clubs and spades only)
- 6s
- 5s
- 4s (except the 4 of clubs)

The game can also be played with only the cards up to the Queens, removing 4 through 7 (but keeping the trump cards).

== Señas (signals) ==
Señas are gestures used between players of the same team to tell the pie (captain) their most valuables cards or if they have a good envido score. In some versions the official señas must be used, rather than private ones not generally understood. In the Argentine game the accepted señas are:

- Ancho de Espadas (Ace of swords) - Both eyebrows up or wink with the right eye.
- Ancho de Bastos (Ace of clubs) - Wink with the left eye.
- Siete de Espadas (Seven of swords) - With lips closed, slightly move the right side to the right.
- Siete de Oro (Seven of coins) - With lips closed, slightly move the left side to the left.
- Tres (any three) - Slowly and gently move the lower lip inside and take it back out slightly biting it with the two front teeth.
- Dos (any two) - With lips closed, move them to the outside as if they were simulating a kiss. The lips remain closed.
- Ancho Falso (Ace of cups and ace of coins) - Mouth open for few seconds or inflate the cheeks.
- High score for envido - Shrink the middle of the face in such a way that the skin of the nose shrinks too. Another usual gesture is to slightly (and quickly) tilt your head towards the shoulder.
- Low or no score for truco - Blink both eyes.
- 12, 11 or 10 - Touch shoulder, chin, triceps of the arm or elbow.

Señas are optional; there is no obligation to signal one's cards. The intention is that signals are made to one's partner when opponents are not looking, but they can also be used as a deceptive strategy, making a misleading signal intended to be noticed by the opposition; this is not against the rules.

== Truco in Paraguay ==
In Paraguay, "truco" enjoys great popularity, very similar to the Argentine variant but with certain peculiarities. In Paraguayan truco, if a player has not yet touched their cards, any calls they do will not be considered as such. Therefore, one of the "tricks" is to make these false calls to gauge the reaction of the distracted opponent. However, if a player already in the game has made a call before, what is said can be considered a response to the invitation.

In all cases, in the most important games, the custom of Paraguayan truco is that the rules are reviewed and agreed upon by the participants before starting the game, or at least the most controversial ones like the "Flor" or the "Falta Envido," given the large number of regional variants.

The Flower: There is no uniform rule, so it is customary to agree whether to play with it or not, and whether only during the "bad" (first 15 points) or also during the "good" (last 30 points), before starting the game to avoid inconveniences. If no agreement has been made, the game is played with the Flower during both the bad and good points for the player who calls it, and the game cannot be won with the Flower.

A little-used variant of the Flower, with loosely unified rules, is the "Flor Chaqueña," a play on words with the western region of Paraguay, arid and with scarce vegetation, and consists of having three "Cuatros" in hand. The Flor Chaqueña can award 3 points to the player who has it or grant them the game.

The Envido: As a general rule, the "Falta Envido" has a value equal to the points needed for the team closest to completing 30 points.

The Truco: It is played to the best of three hands, meaning the point is won by the player who wins two out of three games.

Emparde (Tie): If there is a tie in the first hand (empardar), the player or team that wins the second hand wins the point.

The "Pri": If a team wins the first hand, they will win the point if they tie in the second hand, or if, after losing the second hand, they tie in the third. Hence the expression used, "La pri vale oro" (The Pri is worth gold).

== Jargon (Spanish) ==
Many informal expressions have become part of the game, such as:

- Siete bravo (wild seven) - the seven of spades and the seven of coins are sometimes referred to as wild sevens.
- Estar cargado (to be loaded) - to have high score for a potential envido or to have a good hand for truco.
- Vení (come) or vení acá (come here) - said by the pie to a partner to ask them to play their lowest card, typically because the pie expects to play the winning card.
- Andá allá (go there) - in a game with teams of three, said to a player by the pie to ask them to play their lowest card because the third team member expects to win the hand.
- Estoy seco (I'm dry) or estoy ciego (I'm blind) - a player says this in relation to an envido or playing a hand if they do not have winning cards.
- No ha venido (it hasn't come) - a rhyming response to refuse an envido.
- Va por las tuyas or son las tuyas (play by your own [cards]) - said by a player who does not have good cards when truco or envido is challenged, to tell teammates to decide according to their own cards.
- Falta un vidrio - sometimes said to trick opponents into revealing their score, because it sounds like falta envido.
- Jugála callado (Play it quietly) - warning teammate not to call truco or envido.
- A cara de perro - Literally dog-faced; meaning following rules exactly, especially regarding the displaying of envido. In friendly games a player is often excused if they forget to show their cards to confirm their stated envido score. However, when playing with strangers or for money, games are usually played a cara de perro. Another example would be saying "envido", "truco", etc. in conversation; in strict playing this is a call.
- Está peluda (it's hairy) - This is said either when a player can win the hand but it leaves them with no other cards or when a player has low cards.
- Dormir adentro/ dormir afuera (Sleep inside/ sleep outside) - when a team or sole player makes more/less than 15 points.

=== Jargon (Brazil) ===
- Baralho Vazio/Baralho Limpo (empty deck/clean deck) - used for the variations where the lowest cards 7s, 6s, 5s and 4s are not used. 8s and 9s are always excluded.
- Baralho cheio/Baralho sujo (full deck/ dirty deck) - 7s, 6s, 5s and 4s are used, but 8s and 9s are excluded.
- Melar/Cangar/Embuchar/Empachar/Amarrar - to play a card of the same value as the highest card at the table.
- Mão de Onze (also mão de dez)- When a player (or team) or both players (or teams) has 11 (or 10) points.
- Mão de Ferro (also mão escondida)- When both teams have need one point to win so the last round is playable in the dark (no escuro) where no one sees the cards. (This option is chosen by the players when both teams agree. Usually played in Truco Paulista).
- Cair (to fall) - To accept a Truco, Seis or Nove.
- Correr (to run) - To quit when the other player (or team) calls Truco, Seis or Nove.
- Manilhas - trump cards.

In Truco Paulista, manilha are the cards of the next number of the one who was trumped at the beginning of the round. For example: if a 2 is trumped, the manilha are the 3s. Then, the strength of each manilha depends on the stamp, which follows (strongest to weakest): clubs (zap), hearts (copas), spades (espadilha), diamonds (pica-fumo).

- Mão (hand) - The first to play.
- Pé (foot) - The last to play.
- Marreco/Pato (duck) - During the game, the losers are called patos or marrecos.
- Turco (Turk),Túlio (a male name),Suco (juice)... - words sounding similar to truco, used to joke (and scare team partners) during a Mão de Onze, when it is not allowed to call truco (mostly the play that say truco lose the game).
- Na testa (to the forehead) - The player with the strongest card in the game, the Zap, in order to show complete happiness for winning that round screams Na testa! and smashes the card directly to the opponent's forehead, often after licking it.
- Meio Pau/Meio saco (half dick/half sack)- to call Seis (works like a retruco). Meio means half and Seis is 6 (half dozen). However, in many variations, Seis does not mean 6 points.
- Morrer de pau duro (to die with a boner) - Losing the round despite holding hand the Zap.
- Surra de pau mole (equivalent to "pig blapping") - This one has many similar meanings. Basically it means winning the game or round on a bluff.
- Passar de baixo da mesa (to pass under the table) - When the opponents lose without making any points, they have to literally pass under the table as a punishment. It is used mainly in the southern like in the state of Santa Catarina.
- A primeira vai à missa (first hand is golden) - a way to indicate the importance of the first hand.

Jargon is often used to fool the other team.
