= Tarbais bean =

Local variety of the bean Phaseolus vulgaris

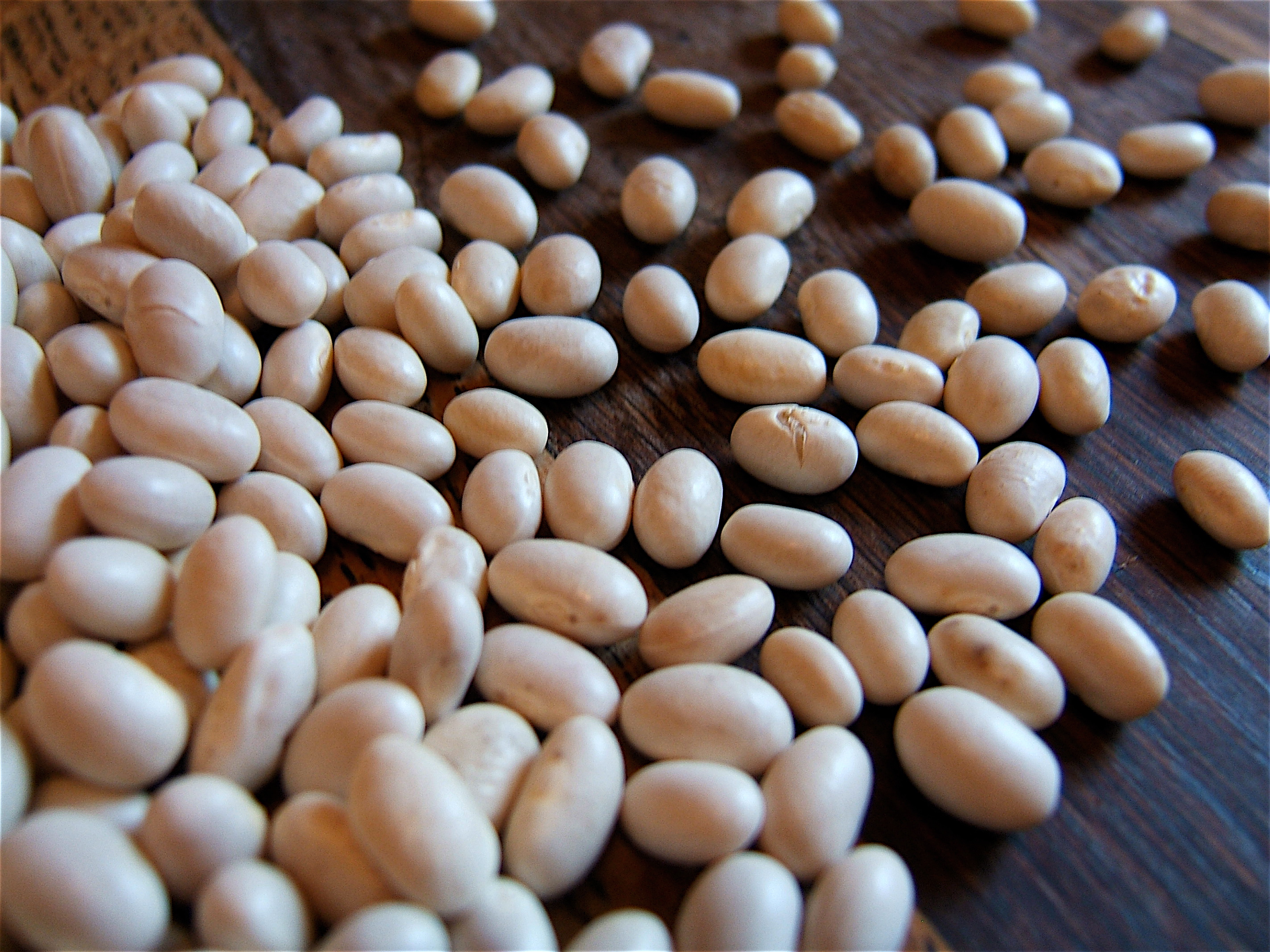
- Genus: Phaseolus
- Species: Phaseolus vulgaris
- Cultivar group: Tarbais beans
- Cultivar: 'Alaric'

The Tarbais bean is a local variety of the bean Phaseolus vulgaris from the south-west of France. It is a product of terroir, whose production area lies mainly within the Hautes-Pyrénées, but also in some municipalities of Gers, Haute-Garonne and Pyrénées-Atlantiques. Recognised by the Label Rouge since 1997 and the PGI since 2000, its characteristics are guaranteed by specific scope statements.

== History ==
Originally from the New World, the bean crossed the Pyrenees and established itself in the plain of Tarbes at the beginning of the 18th century. After declining in the 1950s, Tarbais bean cultivation was rejuvenated in 1986.

Formerly grown on the stalks of maize, the Tarbais bean is now produced on plastic nets, although many individuals continue to associate it with maize.

== Cultivars ==
In the 1990s, 24 seed lines were selected by the INRA from among all the cultivars grown on farms in the department. Only one, the 'Alaric' seed, is available to the public and enables it to obtain the Red Label.

== Production area ==
The PGI delimits a production area centred on the vast northern part of the Hautes-Pyrénées department, that reaches to its borders. Also involved are certain cantons in Gers, Pyrénées-Atlantiques and Haute-Garonne, which border on the main region, directly or indirectly.

== Main stages of production ==
The ground is prepared in the spring for the sowing which is carried out in the middle of spring. About a month later, as the plant develops, the staking on the net can gradually take place. It is therefore useful to aerate the soil by hilling and hoeing in order to compensate for the repeated movement of agricultural machinery. Throughout the growing season, depending on observation and the results of analysis, the producer may intervene in a number of ways: fertilization, irrigation, pest control... Harvesting is exclusively manual and carried out in several stages, the fresh beans being picked in pods from the end of August to the beginning of September and the dry beans being picked from the plant from 20 September to mid-November. Then come, depending on the need, the steps related to drying and shattering. For better quality, progressive sorting takes place before packaging.

To eliminate beans parasitised by insects such as the bean weevil, seeds intended for sowing can be stored in the freezer at -35 °C for 24 to 48 hours. In order not to cause thermal shock, they will then be left for the same period in the refrigerator between 0 and 4°C then they can be stored between 10 and 20°C until sowing.

== Characteristics ==
The Tarbais bean is a large white bean, with very thin stringy skin. It is also characterized by a melting and soft flesh, a delicate and non-starchy texture.

== Gastronomy ==
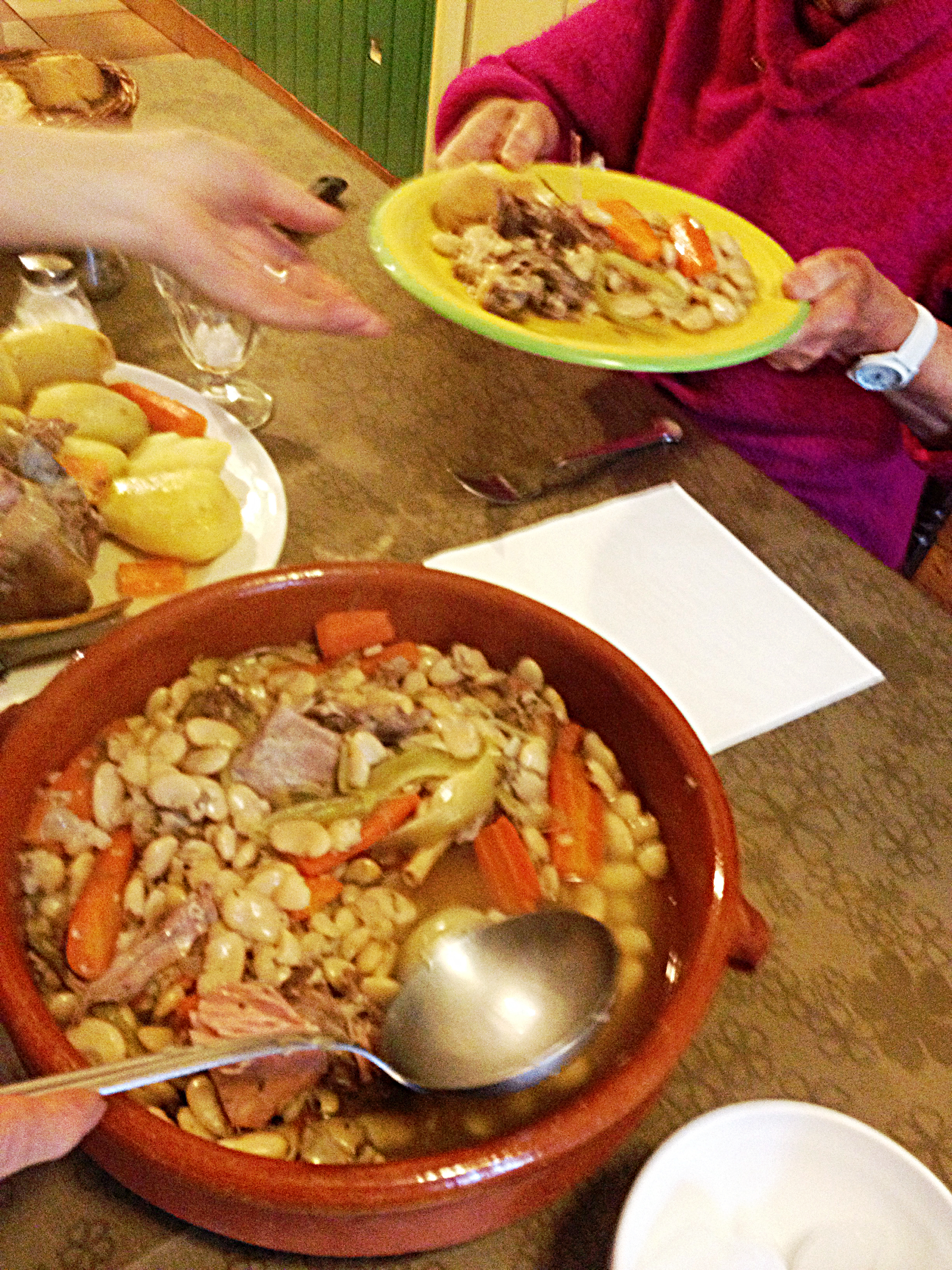
Cassoulet

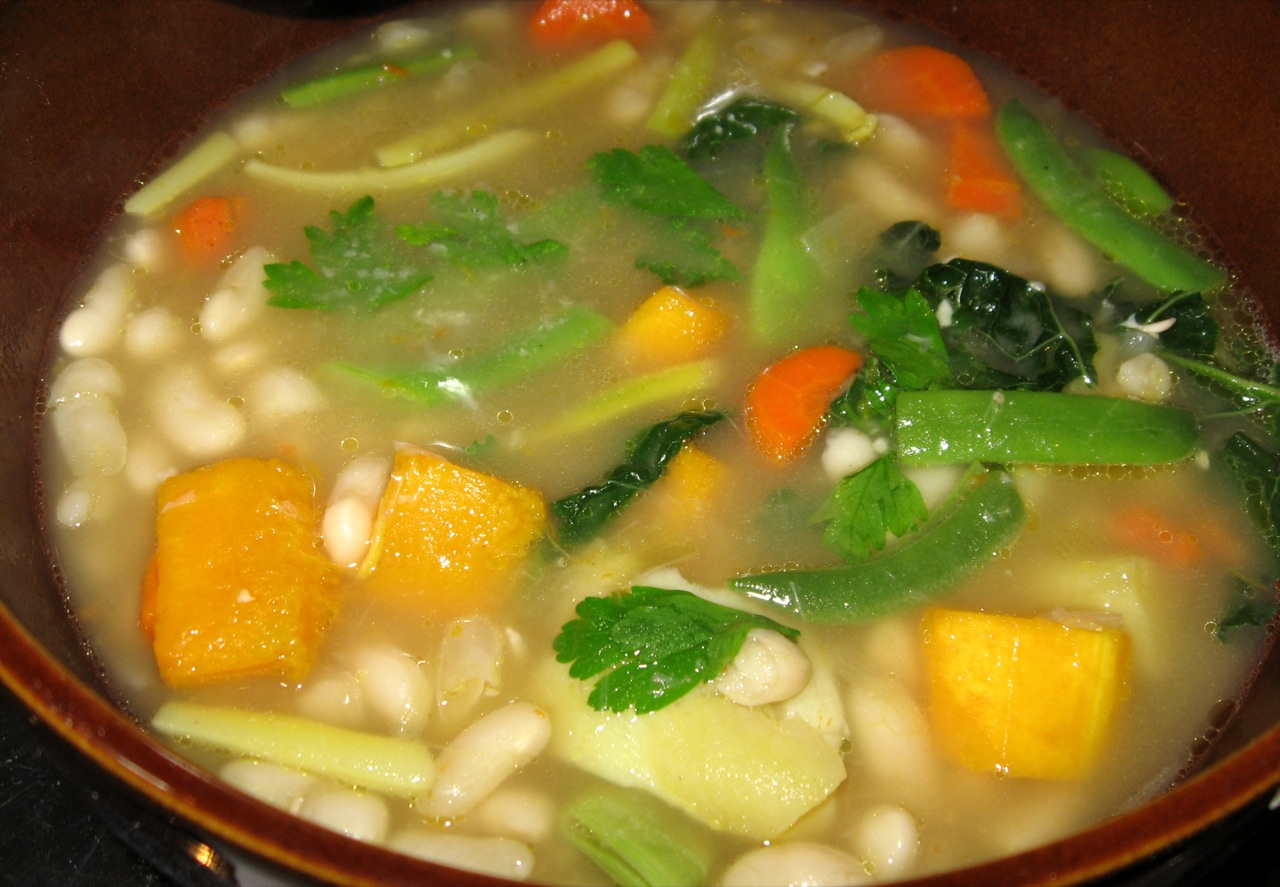
Garbure

== See also ==
- Common Bean
- Hautes-Pyrénées
- Bigorre
- Tarbes
- Gastronomy
- Terroir
