= Put (card game) =

16th-century card game

- The tavern game of "ill repute"
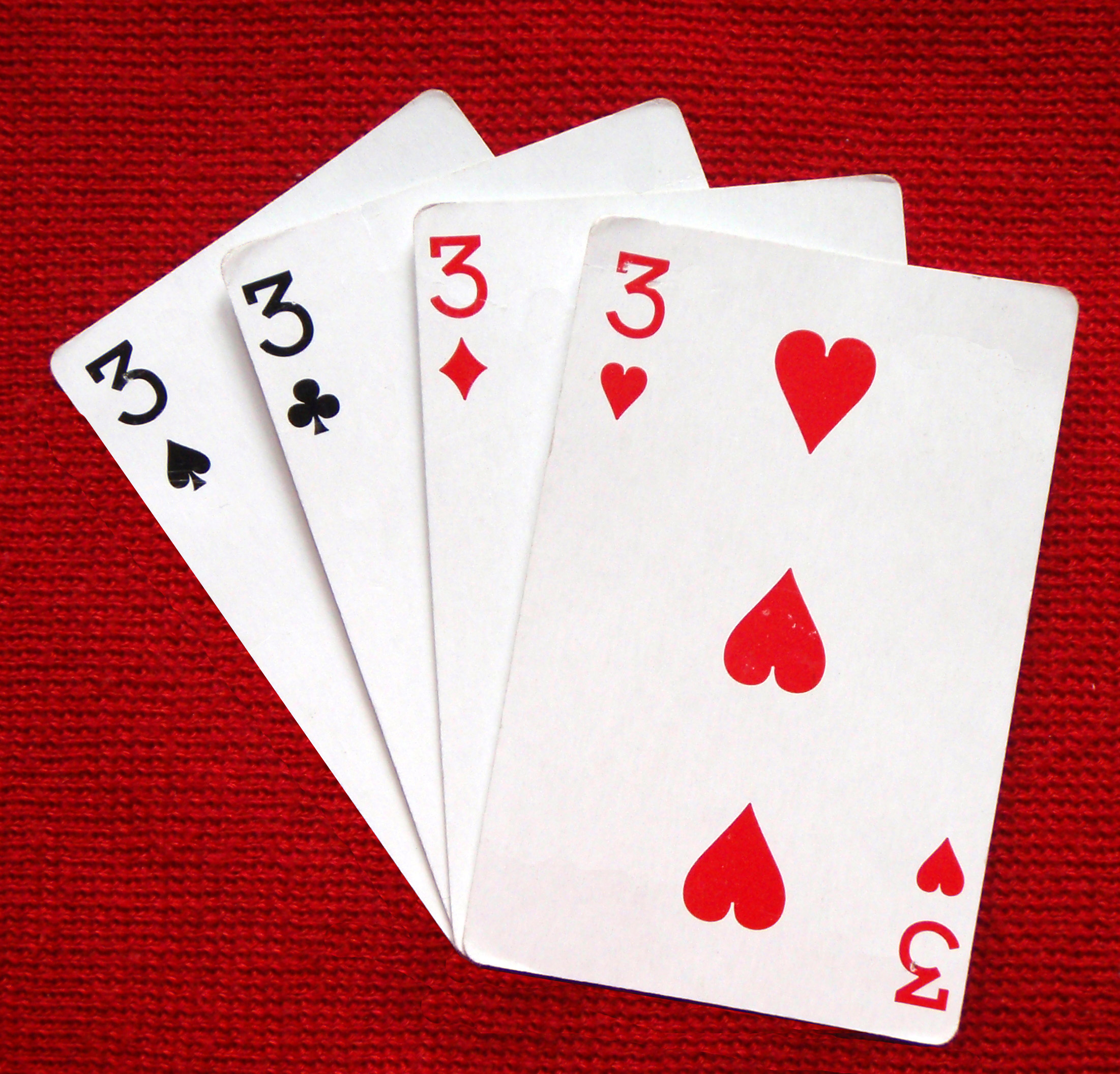
- The highest ranking cards are the Threes
- Origin: England
- Alternative names: Putt
- Type: Vying game
- Family: Trick-taking
- Players: 2-4
- Skills: Tactics & Strategy
- Cards: 52
- Deck: English
- Rank (high→low): 3 2 A K Q J T 9 8 7 6 5 4
- Play: Clockwise
- Playing time: 15 min.
- Chance: Medium

Related games
- Aluette • Truc • Truco • Vitou

Put, occasionally Putt, is an English tavern game first recorded in the 16th century and later castigated by 17th century moralists as one of ill repute. It belongs to a very ancient family of trick-taking card games and bears close similarities a group known as Truc, Trut, Truque, also Tru, and the South American game Truco. Its more elaborate cousin is the Spanish game of Truc, which is still much played in many parts of Southern France and Spain.

== Etymology ==
The name Put, pronounced "uh" like the "u" in the English village of Putney, derives from "putting up your cards in case", if you do not like them, or from "putting each other to the shift". (Note: And thus like the "u" in "putt", the golf stroke.) Cotton spells it Putt.

== History ==
Put is mentioned as early as 1662 where the opening line of a poem, The Riddle, says "S-hall's have a Game at Put, to pass away the time..." It appears in a compendium of poems and songs from the period 1639–1661. The rules of Put are recorded as early as the 1670s by Willughby and Cotton. At that time it was considered a very disreputable game, "the ordinary rooking game of every place", rooking meaning "cheating". Its reputation was such that Crawley (1876) cites an early play as saying "if you want to be robbed, my son, play Put in a tavern." It was a game of the servants' quarters along with loo, whist and all fours. Cotton's rules were reprinted in various editions of The Compleat Gamester until 1750 and sporadically copied into the 19th century. No new information appears until around 1800 with Pigott and Jones' versions of Hoyle's Games. During the 19th century most sources copy these texts almost verbatim. Put died out during the 19th century, but not before having influenced Brag.

== Put (17th/18th century) ==
The following description is based on the two earliest sources: Willughby (1672) and Cotton (1674). Put was almost invariably a two-hand game, although Willughby includes extra rules for any number of players and Cotton suggests three may also play. A full 52-card English pattern pack is used with cards ranking in the unusual order of 3-2-A-K-Q-J-10-9-8-7-6-5-4 in each suit. The game is won by the first player to score 5 points (a "Putt") or 7 points over as many deals as necessary.

The player drawing the highest Put-card (Threes high, Fours low) deals first, and the deal then alternates. The dealer shuffles and non-dealer cuts. The dealer then gives three cards each, singly, non-dealer first. If there are more players, cards are dealt in clockwise order and the deal passes to the left each time.

Non-dealer leads to the first trick. Players may always play any card; there are no trumps and no requirement to follow suit. The trick is taken by the higher card, and the winner of a trick leads to the next. If cards of equal rank are played e.g. two Threes or two Aces, the trick is tied. It is laid to one side and belongs to neither player. The same player then leads again.

A player winning 2 o of the 3 tricks scores 1 point towards game. If each player wins a trick and the third is tied, it is "trick and tye" and neither scores.

A player with a strong hand could say "Put" before playing to a trick. If the opponent declines, the 'putter' scores 1 point. If the opponent says "I see it", they play on and the one who takes most tricks wins the whole game, the Put, i.e. 5 or 7 points. There is no option to fold unless one's opponent has said "Put".

Cotton's account of 1674 is reprinted until 1750 and appears again in Bohn (1850) and no other descriptions appear during the 18th century.

== Put (19th century) ==
Pigott (1800) introduces new information. For the first time, methods of keeping score are described: whist counters, money as counters, chalking or drawing 5 lines or strokes with a pencil or chalk and erasing 1 line per point; the first to erase all 5 winning the game.

In terms of play; a player can "throw up his cards", i.e. fold, on viewing the cards dealt or before playing a card to a trick, thus conceding 1 point to the opponent. Otherwise there is no practical change to the rules, a player being allowed to challenge with "I put" which, if accepted, means they will both play for the game.

For the first time four-handed Put is described, whereby each person has a partner and when the cards are dealt, one partner gives the other their best card and throws the others two away; the partner receiving the card discards their worst card and a two-hand game is then played as normal.

== Strategy ==
Considerable daring is necessary in this game, for a bold player will often "Put" upon very bad cards in order to tempt the adversary into giving him a point. Sometimes the hand is played with "Putting", when the winner of the three tricks, or of two out of three, scores 1 point. The best cards are first: the Threes, next the Twos, and then the Aces; the Kings, Queens, Knaves, and Tens following in order down to the Four, which is the lowest card in the pack.

== Variants ==
One variant of the game is to shorten the pack to 32 cards by stripping out all the lower ranks from Four to Nine.

=== Le Truc ===
In his book A Gamut of Games, Sid Sackson describes a French game called Le Truc, which he translates as "The Knack". This is played with a 32-card pack ranking 6-7-A-K-Q-J-T-9. The winning of two tricks, or one and two ties, scores 1 point. When about to play to a trick, a player may propose to double the value of the hand, allowing the other to throw in his hand to prevent the double from taking effect. The first to reach 12 points wins the game, and the first to win two games wins the rubber. The French version of Truc is closely related to the English Put.

=== Four-handed Put ===
Four-handed Put differs only in that any two of the players give each his best card to his partner, who then lays out one of his or her cards, and the game then proceeds as in two-handed Put.

== In literature ==
The game of Put appears in a "riddle", or acrostic, probably written by a Royalist in the interval between the resignation of Richard Cromwell on May 25, 1659 and the restoration of Charles II, crowned at Westminster Abbey on 23 April 1661. It expresses in enigmatical terms the designs and hopes of the King's adherents, under colour of describing a game of "Put". The poem is as follows:

S-hall's have a Game at Put, to pass away the time ?
X-pect no foul-play; though I do play the Knave
I-have a King at hand, yea, that I have:
C-Cards be true, then the Game is mine.
R-ejoyce my heart, to see thee then repine.
A-that's lost, that's Cuckold's luck.
T-rey comes like Quarter, to pull down the Buck.

The initial letters of the seven verses are an anagram, and indicate the number of cards shared between the two players in the game. S, X, I, C, R, A, T, make SIX CART, or six cartes (six cards). Six cards, also, are expressly mentioned in the riddle itself, namely: "the Knave" (line 2), "a King" (3), "Heart" (5), "Trey", "Quarter" or quatre, and "the Buck" (7). "The Buck", probably one of the picture-cards, or the ace, inferior to "Trey", which is the best card in the game of put; therefore "Trey" comes "to pull down the Buck".

"The Buck" is an old English synonym for the Coarse Appellation, intended, no doubt, for a Puritan, or for the Puritan party. "Pulling down the Buck", is also an allusion to hunting.

John Dickson Carr's novel The Devil in Velvet, set in 1675 London, includes a scene at Whitehall Palace in which the King's mistress Nell Gwyn and the courtier Ralph Montague play Put with stakes in the thousands of guineas. Gwyn is depicted as saying she prefers Put to other card games such as Ombre which are "too slow".

The game of Put also appears in "The English Rogue", written by the Irish author Richard Head. He also describes the rules of the game played during his time.

== See also ==
- Primero
- Truco
- Poker
- Gilet

== Literature ==
- _ (1662). Rump: or an Exact Collection of the Choycest Poems and Songs Relating to the Late Times. By the most Eminent Wits, from AD 1639 to Anno 1661. London: Henry Bromen and Henry Marsh.
- _ (1798). The Sporting Magazine, Vol. XI. London: J. Wheble.
- _ (1859). Notes and Queries. London: Bell & Daldy, Jan-Jul 1859.
- Cotton, Charles (1674) The Compleat Gamester. London: A.M.
- Head, Richard (1668). The English Rogue, London: Francis Kirkman.
- Jones, Charles (1800). Hoyle's Games Improved. London: Ritchie.
- Parlett, David (1992). Oxford Dictionary of Card Games. Oxford: OUP. ISBN 0-19-869173-4
- Parlett, David (1995). Teach Yourself Card Games. London: Hodder & Stoughton. ISBN 0-340-59204-4
- Pigott, Charles (1800). Pigott's New Hoyle. London: Ridgway.
- "Trumps" [ Dick, William Brisbane ] (1868). The Modern Pocket Hoyle. NY: Dick and Fitzgerald.
- Willughby, Francis. A Volume of Plaies. (Manuscript in the Middleton collection, University of Nottingham, shelfmark Li 113.) c1665-70. published in Francis Willughby's Book of Games in 2003 by Jeff Forgeng, Dorothy Johnston and David Cram (2003). Ashgate Press. ISBN 1 85928 460 4.(2003).
- Latham, Robert Gordon (1850). A Grammar of the English Language for Commercial Schools. London: Taylor, Walter & Maberly.
