= Grimaud (company) =

Brand of playing cards

- Industry: playing cards
- Founded: c. 1851 in Paris
- Founder: Baptiste-Paul Grimaud
- Headquarters: Lorraine, France
- Parent: France Cartes Cartamundi
- Website: cartes-grimaud.fr

Grimaud is a brand of playing cards published by France Cartes Cartamundi, a manufacturer of playing cards and board games based in Lorraine.

== History ==
In 1840, Baptiste-Paul Grimaud, a 23-year-old man from Brûlain near Niort, moved to Paris.

In 1851, he joined forces with two merchants, Eugène Martineau and Marcel Bourru, who eventually sold him their cardmaking operation. A few years later, the company implemented a process to manufacture round-cornered playing cards, an innovation that was very successful.

Industrializing the card manufacturing process and buying out or outdoing its competitors (Camoin in 1885, Lequart and Mignot in 1891, Bony, Dieudonné and Fossorier and Amar in 1910), Grimaud gradually became the biggest French cardmakers.

It was at the 1900 Paris Exposition that Grimaud marked its high point when the company was awarded numerous prizes. After the death of Baptiste-Paul Grimaud in 1899, his nephews succeeded him: they participated in the edition of Tarot de Marseille, a card pack used both for card games and cartomancy.

In 1962, Jean-Marie Simon bought Grimaud to become the number one playing card manufacturer in France by founding the company France Cartes, which later joined the international group Cartamundi in 2014.

In 2018, the brand of the French master cardmakers celebrated its 170th anniversary. For the occasion, the logo, cards and cases were redesigned in a modern spirit while keeping past inspirations.

== Grimaud games ==
The Grimaud brand offers a wide and varied range of card packs. They claim that the quality of their playing cards is the fruit of ancestral know-how and characterised by clean graphics, smooth touch, optimal gliding, full opacity to avoid cheating, rounded corners, double-headed figures, formats adapted to the typology of the game. Each characteristic of the card is designed for playability, from the thickness of the cardboard, to the inks and varnishes, size of the card and the cutouts. They view these as important elements for card games and card tricks to assist in holding, dealing, fanning, hiding and folding cards without marking them and ensuring they cannot be seen through.

Grimaud collaborates with artists, designers, illustrators and even events in order to produce limited edition packs.

== France Cartamundi Cards ==
Grimaud's parent company is France Cartes Cartamundi, which is a manufacturer of playing cards and board games and is based in France, at Saint-Max.

The company also develops sets of advertising cards (promotional and personalized), and works for publishing houses as well as major brands. The playing card manufacturer is a member of the Association des Créateurs et Fabricants de Jouets Français, and holder of the Entreprise du Patrimoine Vivant distinction awarded for excellence of craftsmanship and manufacture.
