= Mus (card game) =

Basque card game

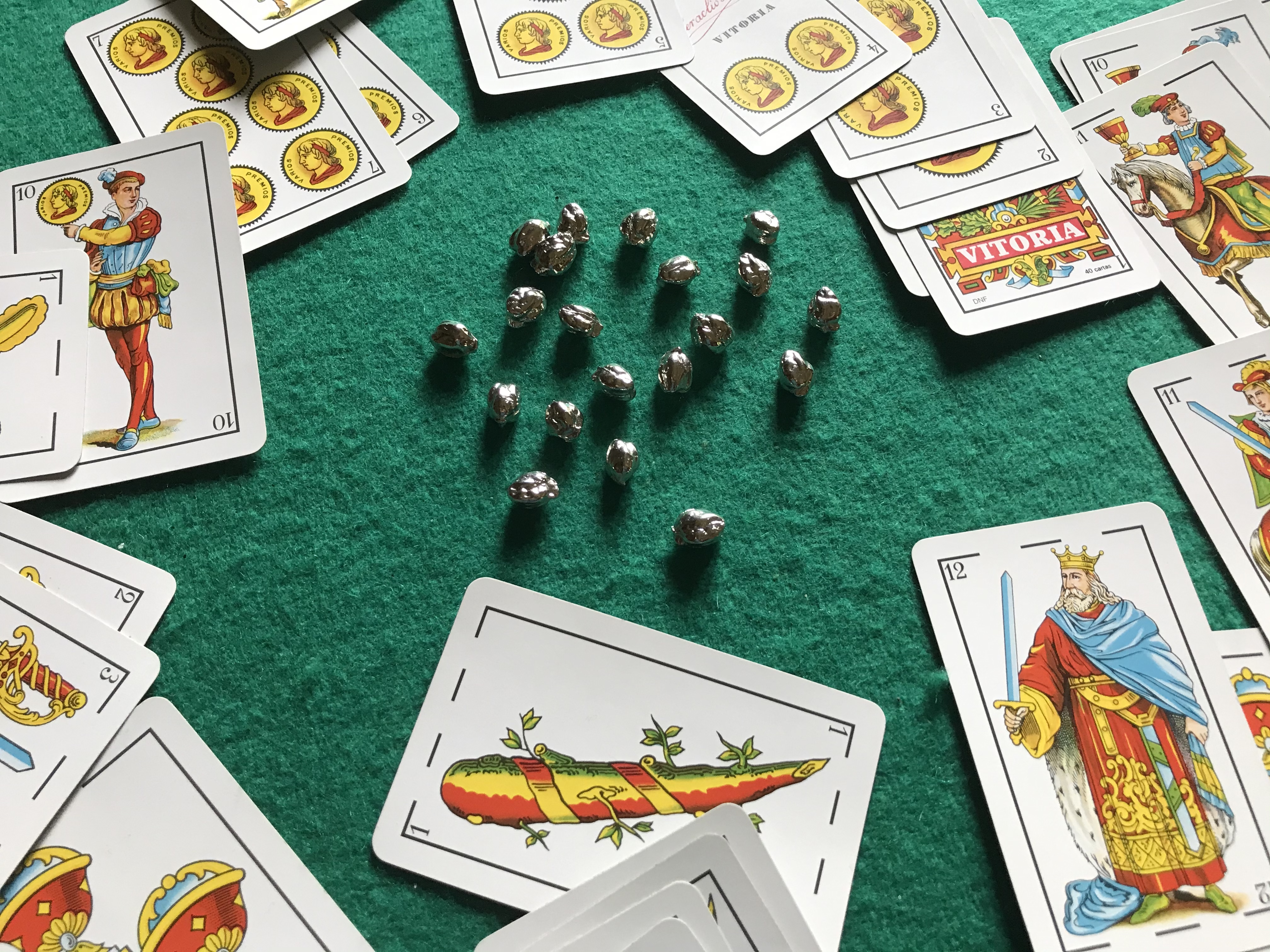
- Origin: Basque country
- Type: Comparing
- Players: 4
- Skills: Attention
- Cards: 40
- Deck: Spanish
- Rank (high→low): (K or 3) Q J 7 6 5 4 (2 or A)
- Play: Counter-clockwise
- Playing time: 20 min
- Chance: Low

Mus is a card game widely played in Spain, France and Hispanic America. Originating in the Basque Country, it is a vying game. The first reference to this game dates back to 1745, when Manuel Larramendi, philologist and Jesuit Basque, quoted it in a trilingual dictionary (Basque-Spanish-Latin).

In Spain it is the most widely played card game, spawning several Mus clubs or peñas and becoming a staple game among college students. It is not uncommon to hear the Basque terms, such as órdago (from Basque hor dago, "there it is") used by Spanish speakers, often without them being aware of the literal meanings of the terms and phrases.

The origin of the word Mus is uncertain. It could come from the Basque language, where musu means "kiss", the established signal of the better possible card combination (3 Kings and one Ace). Larramendi wrote about the word mus or "musu" meaning lips or face and suggests that the name of the game could have derived from the facial gestures used while playing.

According to another theory, the word "mus" comes from the Latin musso, that means "keep silent". It is conjugated as mus ("I keep silent"), in opposition to "talk", that is the word used to open the game.

A third hypothesis is that the word may have come from the French mouche ("fly"), from Latin mussula, although the concept "fly" has no relevance to any part of the game.

== History ==
Basque emigrants carried the game to other countries such as the US and Australia, where it is played in Basque clubs. Nowadays there is an international Mus tournament, in addition to many national and regional competitions.

== Description ==
The game is played between two opposing pairs of players with the Spanish deck which has 40 cards, without eights, nines, tens, or jokers. Mus has a variety of different rules in the different regions of Spain.

The game has four rounds:

- Handia ("Biggest"): playing for the highest combination of cards.
- Txikia ("Smallest"): playing for the lowest combination of cards.
- Pareak ("Pairs"): playing for the best matching card combination.
- Jokoa ("Game"): playing for cards total values of 31 or more. Sometimes replaced by a Puntua (Point) special round.

In each of these four rounds players take by order a call each, verbalizing (usually after discussing it with their partner) whether the partnership will bid (envido) or pass (paso) which only results in skipping call turn to next player. After all four players have spoken each round, the bids (apostua) made are left hanging until the scoring round at the end. If no bet was made and all four players passed to bid, the round is "in pass" and will be decided at the end of the hand for a reduced value of just one point.

It has a distinctive feature in that passing some established signals (keinuak) between players is perfectly allowed during the game.

One other special feature of Mus is that it is a mostly verbal game, with little card-involving action, limited to deal and discard, if any. After cards are dealt and Mus (discard) is stopped, all rounds are played verbally, bets are called, passed, accepted or rejected but cards are not shown, dealt or touched in any further way, and the player is only obliged to show them in the end of the round if needed in order to resolve any accepted bet. This makes Mus more difficult to learn simply by watching others play than most other card games, as it can be difficult to follow simply by watching.

== Rules ==
Mus is played by four players working as two teams. Partners sit opposite each other and play moves in a counter-clockwise direction.

Every hand consists of four rounds: Handia ("Biggest"), Txikia ("Smallest"), Pareak ("Pairs") and Jokoa ("Game"). If the "Game" round cannot be played because nobody has a hand total value of 31 or more, the whole round is replaced by Puntua ('Point'). After the fourth round, there is a scoring round, when all scores are calculated. The game is played with a pool of 30 points in the middle of the table. The points are usually represented by beans, coins or sometimes any other object, which are called hamarreko (oddly, from Basque "unit of ten", although it is worth five tanto) when playing the game. When a point is scored by a couple, one of this couple players takes a bean and puts it on their team's side. To decrease the need for many beans, one player's side counts as one-point beans and the other side as five-point beans. This makes it possible to play with only 16 beans in the table.

A match (partida) is divided into games (joko). Each game is won by the first team to reach 30 points. In Spain, three games count as one vaca and three vacas win the match, although there are many other scoring variations, for example, in some places the game is played to five games and five vacas. However, in the Basque Country and northern Spain La Rioja, Mus may played with four Kings and at 40 points instead of the standard 30. This variation has to be played with 22 beans in the pool instead of 16. In the rest of Spain, the regular rules are eight Kings and 30 points. When played with eight Kings, threes count as Kings and twos count as Aces. With eight Kings, it is much easier to get good hands and riskier to bet high.

=== Starting the game ===
In the first game, the dealer is selected randomly. After that, the dealer will be the last game's first player. In this way, the speaking order changes in each game and all the players get to be the first one to speak at some point. The dealer shuffles the cards and their left hand player cuts the deck. After this, they deal four cards, one card at a time, to each player starting with the player to their right and finishing with themself. Once the cards have been dealt, they put the deck aside and the game begins. The first player to speak will be the player at the right hand side of the dealer. Being the dealer is disadvantageous because ties are solved by speaking order: in case of a tie the person who spoke first wins.

=== "Musa" or "Musik ez" ===
Starting with the player to the right hand side of the dealer (known as Esku), each player declares whether or not they want to have a discard phase. By turns they say either "Musa" (to agree on discard) or "Musik ez". The turn to speak is as follows: 1 Esku. 2 His or her partner. 3 Second player (the one after "Esku"). 4 Fourth player, which is the dealer in the round and partner of the last. This position is commonly known as "postre" (last) as it comes last in the playing order, so that player has a somehow handicapped ability in that hand. This way the team that speak first can seem to render themselves vulnerable (being true or fake) letting the opposition know that their cards are not good enough, since they want to discard. The opposition team can then decide whether or not there will be mus.

Only if all four players agree, there is a discard phase (Mus), where they can discard up to all four cards or none at all. The dealer feeds to each player the requested cards one by one. After discard, the players repeat the process of discussing a new discard phase (Mus or not Mus) until at least one of them finally disagrees. If needed, the discarded pile can be reshuffled and dealt again as many times as needed. After a player refuses to have a new discard phase, the playing rounds begin. Of course, having one or more discard rounds will make the player and their partner get better cards, but the same applies for the opposing couple so this is the point to be considered regarding Mus.

=== The rounds ===
==== Handia ====
The first round is called Handia. The two teams compete for the highest combination of cards. The highest cards in the Spanish deck are the Kings, followed by Knights and Jacks. In the variant game with eight kings, the threes work as the regular Kings and are therefore as high. For example, a hand like 'King-King-Knight-7' would be better for this round than 'King-Knight-Knight-7'. As it is a bidding game, if one team does not accept the bid then they may not win the hand even though they have higher cards.

==== Txikia ====
The second round is the Txikia. The two teams compete for the lowest combination of cards. The lowest cards in the Spanish deck are the Aces. In the variant game with eight Kings, there are also eight aces, with the twos being the second set of aces. For example, a hand like 'Ace-Ace-5-Knight' would be better for this round than 'Ace-Ace-5-King'.

The Txikia is a round that is overtly despised by most players, since bidding to it reveals (or at least suggests, which can be used) that the player has quite low cards, thus putting the player in a weakened position in the remaining rounds (their Pair should be low, if any, and probably has no Game). Further to this, since all players probably have quite high cards, the chances of getting the bid accepted are scarce.

==== Pareak ====
Before the third and fourth are played, players run a pre-round, declaring whether they have matching cards (Parerik). In this pre-round, the players announce by turns 'Pareak bai'(they have matching cards) or 'Parerik ez' (they don't have matching cards). Having matching cards means that two or more of the cards in their hands have the same face value. If none of the players in a team can play, the whole round is skipped and the other team will score the round in the scoring phase. If none of the four players has Pares, the whole round is skipped altogether.

The lowest combination of matching cards for this round is a single pair ('pareak'), followed by three-of-a-kind ('medial') and the highest Two-pair ('dupleak'). There is no special denomination for four-of-a-kind; it is considered as a Two-pair. Unlike in poker, in mus, Two-pair is a better combination than three-of-a-kind. This accounts for the fact that it is usually played with eight kings and eight aces, which makes three-of-a-kind easier to attain. In case of a tie, the combination with the highest value wins. A 'Knight-Knight-Knight-5' hand would beat 'Ace-Ace-Ace-King'. If two players had exactly the same pares combination, the tie is solved by speaking order: the player who spoke first wins. In the variant game with eight Kings, threes are Kings and twos are Aces for all purposes. This means that a hand such as 'King-3-2-Ace' is effectively a Two-pair of Kings and Aces.

==== Jokoa ====
The fourth and last round is the Jokoa (Game). As in the Pares round, players run a pre-round before the actual round, declaring whether they are able to play or not. Being able to play the Jokoa round means that the total value of the cards in the player's hand is 31 or higher. Players announce by turns 'Jokoa bai' (I have 'Game') or 'Jokorik ez' (I don't have 'Game'). In order to be able to play this round, players have to sum up the face values of their cards, except for face cards, which all count 10. In the variant game of eight Kings, threes count as Kings and twos count as Aces, and therefore they add 10 and 1 respectively to the total hand value. For example, a hand like 'King-3-3-2' will add up to 31 points. The highest total card value for this round is 31, followed by 32, then 40, 37, 36, 35, 34 and the lowest is 33. 38 and 39 are impossible combinations, because in the Spanish deck there are no 8s and 9s. Take into account that 31 is a very easy combination to have in the eight Kings variant, since there are so many 10-value cards and Aces. If none of the players of a team can play, the round is finished and the other team will score the round in the scoring phase. In the situation where none of the four players can play the 'Jokoa' round, it will be replaced by 'Puntua'. The players compete for the highest total card value, being 30 the highest possible total. As usual, in case of a tie, the speaking order rule will solve it.

Good hands for the fourth round involve having at least two ten-point cards (King, Knight, Jack). The only combination of cards that has only one ten-point card is 'King/Knight/Jack-7-7-7'. This is clearly difficult to get and some variants have special rules for this hand and reward it by letting it win against other 31-point combinations regardless of speaking order. Some other regions restrict this special rule to the combination 'Jack-7-7-7' and some others restrict it further by requiring Jack and sevens to be of specific suits. This is called '31 real' ('Royal 31') or simply 'la real' ('The Royal').

=== Playing ===
After the cards have been dealt, the players start playing the rounds, starting by the first one. By speaking order, they have the option of bidding or passing. If a player bids, an opposing player may pass or counterbid. An accepted bid will be left pending until the scoring round. The minimum bid is two points. Once a bid is accepted, the players move on to the next round. If a counterbid is not accepted, the original bidder scores the number of points of the original bid. If the first bid is not accepted, the bidder scores one point straight away. In the scoring round, winners of pending bids will receive the points. There is an exceptional kind of bid called 'hor dago' (in Basque, "there it is"), which, if accepted, ends the whole game in favor of the winning team. Bids are made and accepted by a single player, but the scoring is made by the team. It is therefore possible to accept a bid which the player knows they are going to lose so their teammate will win. If all the players pass in the first or second round, the winning team of each of these rounds will get one single point in the scoring phase once the cards are revealed. This is often the case for the second round, which teams sometimes refuse to bid on but then later claim the single point if they have the lowest combination of cards, even if it's only with one ace.

=== Enbido ===
"'Enbido'" (I bid, derived from the basque word Gonbidatu) is the commonest expression used to bid, it specifically means a two-point bid, which is the lowest possible bid. Then the rival could reply with "'beste bi'" or "'Envido más'" (I bid more), which means they want the 2-bid and even raises the bid two more. However, in every round and turn to call players can bet or raise the existing bet as many points as they wish or even all of them (Ordago) with no limitations. In parts of Spain it is common to play the Ordago by taking a big stone (The Ordago's stone) with the left hand and raising it up. If the opponent accepts the bid, he or she has to take a bigger stone and raise it, too.

=== Scoring ===
After the four rounds have been played and bids have been accepted, there is a scoring round, where the players show their cards and winning bid players claim their bets. In addition to that, the third and fourth rounds give additional scores to the winners depending on how good their hand was. The winning team of the third round scores 1 additional point for each single-pair they have, two points for every three-of-a-kind and three points for every Two-pair. The winning team of the fourth round scores two additional points for each player who could play the round or three points if that player had a total card value of exactly 31. If they played a 'Puntua' round instead, the winning team of the round scores only a single additional point. Scoring is done in sequence and stopped as soon as a team reaches a winning score (even if the opposing team would get a higher score if all the rounds are accounted for). The or dago changes the scoring sequence. The or dago is evaluated immediately and scoring of all other rounds is discarded.

=== Strategy ===
It is impossible to have a hand that wins all the rounds so the best winning hands are usually very good in some rounds, but not all. for example, a hand such as 'King-King-King-King' is very good in the first and third round, but exceptionally bad in the second and mediocre in the fourth. Similarly, a hand such as 'King-King-Knight-Ace' is very good in the fourth round, mediocre in first and third rounds and very bad in the second one. Players usually take into account the cards their teammate might have in order to score in rounds they initially had no good cards for. Also, winning third and fourth rounds always gives additional points and a good strategy is to break the discard phase when both team members can play third and fourth rounds, even with mediocre cards, in order to score those bonuses.

=== Signs ===
In Mus, passing gesture signs indicating which cards a player has to their teammate is perfectly legal, being a decisive strategic factor. However, these signals can only be the ones specified in the rules as explained below, any non-standard signal is not allowed and would result in disqualification if proved.

Sharing knowledge of cards with a partner results in more effective play and allows a more accurate evaluation of the team's chances to win each bet; however, rival players may see the partners passing a signal and get to know their cards. If a rival's signal is detected without their realizing it, a weak spot may be found in their cards which can be used to counter-attack, reversing the hunter-prey role or at least avoiding their strong-point beads.

There are many commonly accepted signals (keinuak) allowed in the game. Any can be used at any time to indicate the hand a player is holding (while trying to hide the transmission of the signal from opponents). The signals have a fixed meaning and it is against the rules to use other signals or use false signals (by signalling a hand which is not held). The keinuak are:

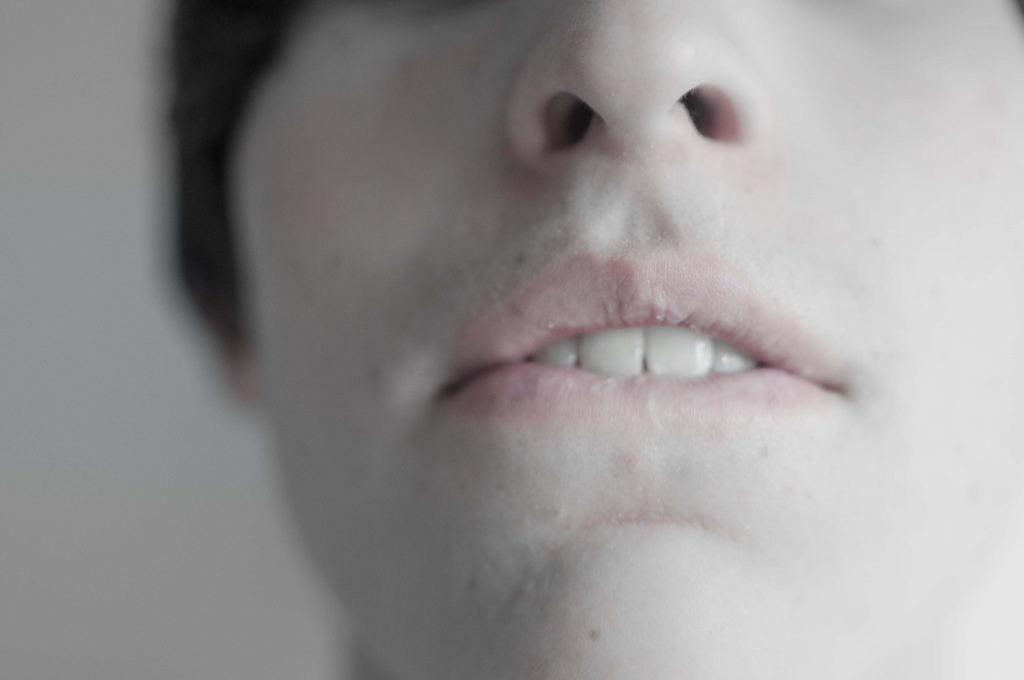
Biting the bottom lip signifies that the player holds a pair of kings

- Two Kings: biting the centre of the bottom lip
- Three Kings: biting one side of the bottom lip
- Two Aces: poking out the tongue
- Three Aces: poking out the tongue to one side
- Single Pair (pareak): tilting the head to one side
- Three-of-a-kind (Mediak): pursing lips to one side of the mouth
- Two-pairs (Dupleak): raising the eyebrows
- 31 (Hogeita hamaikakoa, i.e. 31-point Jokoa): winking
- 30 (30 puntos): lifting both shoulders
- 29: (29 puntos): lifting the right shoulder
- 28: (28 puntos): lifting the left shoulder
- I have nothing (Itsuarena, blind). This indicates a bad hand: closing the eyes
- Royal 31 (31ko erreala, see above): touching the earlobe

Not all of these signals are accepted in all variations and there might be other signals in use. It is always good to clarify the signals in use when playing for the first time.

Players have a wide variety of approaches to signal use, some players make a great number of signals, as soon as they have the chance, some players seldom or never make signals. On the other hand, some players show a honed skill in catching the rival's signals whereas other players do not even make too much an effort to disrupt the opposing couple's signals; some would stare continuously and overtly to the rivals' faces for intercepting signals and others would pretend to get distracted or to be not too interested in catching rival's signals in order to make them overconfident and thus catch subsequent signals.

=== Named hands in Spain ===
In Spain, some arrangements have particular names:

- Duples gallegos ("Galician duples") : King-King-Ace-Ace
- Duples castellanos ("Castilian duples") also called "Duples polacos" ("Polish duples") and "Duples alemanes" ("German duples"): King-King-Knight-Knight.
- Duples vascos ("Basque duples") : King-King-Jack-Jack
- Duples palentinos ("Palentian duples") : King-Knight-Ace-Ace. Actually not duples, as can be seen.
- 31 Real ("Royal 31"): Also, La real ("The Royal"): Jack-7-7-7. It is the only combination of cards that adds up to 31 for the fourth round with only one figure card (King/Knight/Jack). Different house rules consider this hand to beat any other 31-hand with varying requirements. Some people would allow King-7-7-7, while others would require the original Jack-7-7-7 only when the Jack is of a specific suit. Some people restrict it further by requiring that the sevens be of different suit than the Jack. As an example, the rules of a particular tournament might declare that the only hand considered 'Royal 31' is the Jack of coins together with the 7s of swords, clubs and cups.
- La Jugada del tío Perete ("Uncle Perete's hand"): 4-5-6-7. It is simply the worst hand possible. It is weak in all four rounds. Certain house rules allow a single point to be awarded to a player that openly declares this hand before starting to play. Some other places might call it differently: Tanganete in La Rioja or Peterete in Castile and León.
- Solomillo ("Tenderloin") or la bonita ("The Pretty one"): King-King-King-Ace. Some rule sets reserve the name of "solomillo" for pure hands, that is, three Kings and an Ace without 3s or 2s. Unlike the '31 erreala' hand, this distinction has no effect at all on gameplay.
- Ley del Mus ("Law of Mus"): King-King-Knight-Jack. This hand is seen as the minimum a player has to have in order to accept risky bets, at least in first, third and fourth rounds.

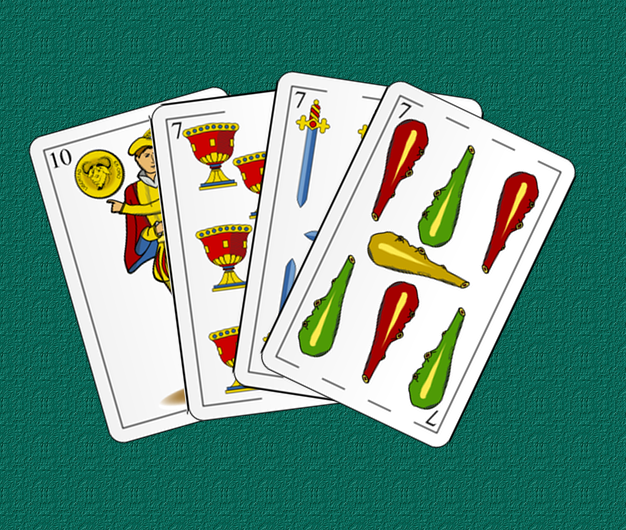
31 Real

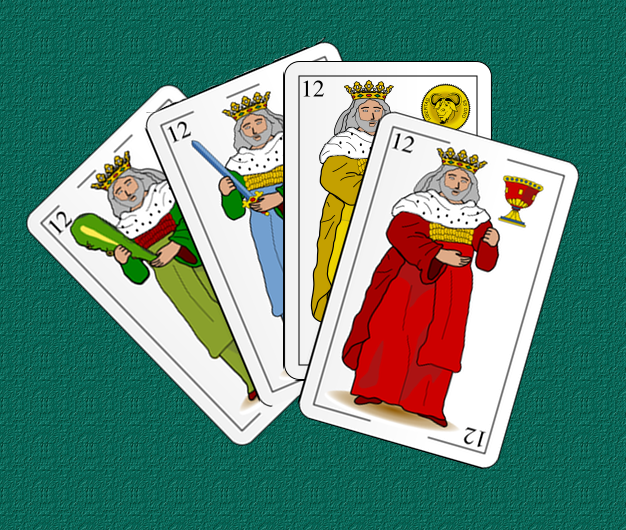
Four Kings

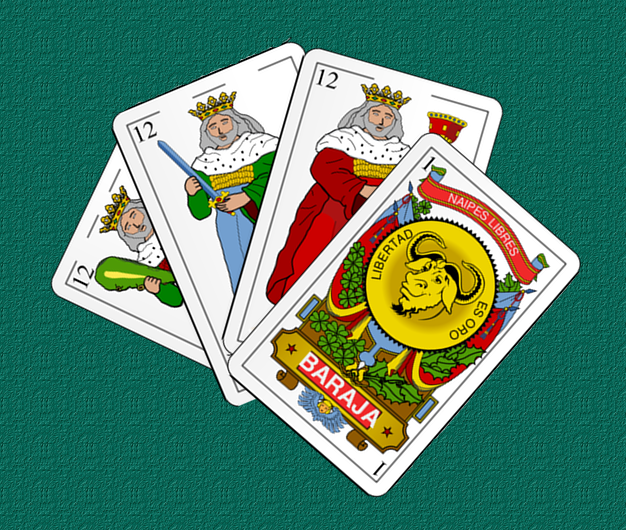
El solomillo, or tenderloin

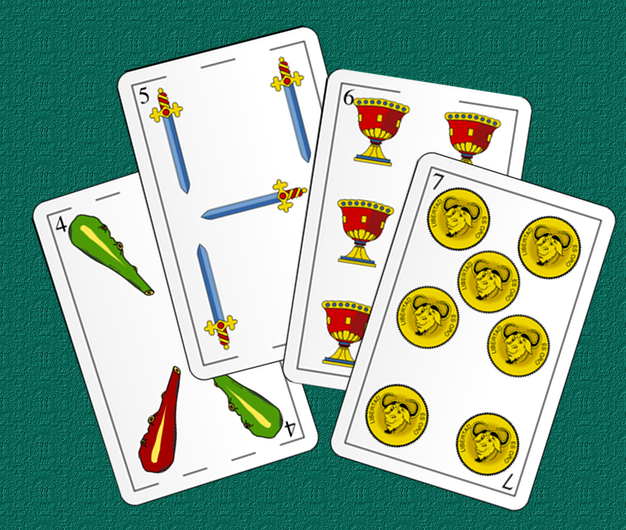
El tío Perete, or 4,5,6 and 7

== See also ==
- Truc
- Ombre
- Calabresella
- Conquian
- Botifarra
