= Truc =

Card game

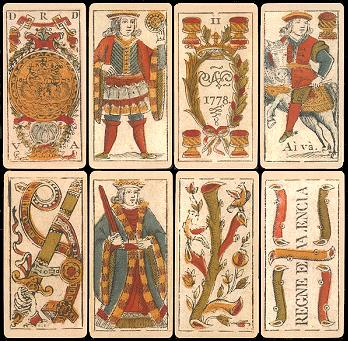
- Replica of a 1778 Spanish deck printed in Valencia. (Note: Original in the Fournier Museum, Alava, Spain.)
- Origin: Spain
- Alternative names: Truque, Trut
- Family: Trick-taking
- Players: 2–6
- Skills: Bluffing
- Cards: 40
- Deck: Spanish
- Play: Counter-clockwise
- Playing time: 25 min.
- Chance: Easy

Related games
- Aluette • Put • Truco • Truc y Flou

Truc, pronounced [tʁy(k)] in France and [tɾuk] in Spain, is a 15th-century bluff and counter-bluff trick-taking card game which has been likened to poker for two. It is played in Occitania, Sarthe (where it is known as trut), Poitou (tru) and the Basque Country (truka), and is still very popular in the Valencia region (joc del truc). More elaborate versions are widely played in Argentina, Uruguay, Venezuela, Paraguay and Brazil under such names as Truco, Truque and Truquiflor. The French version Le Truc has become more widely known in the English-speaking world and among hobbyist gamers after Sid Sackson included it in his popular book A Gamut of Games (1969), it being a translation of E. Lanes' 1912 book, Nouveau Manuel Complet des Jeux de Cartes.

== History ==
The game of Truc probably originates from the end of the Middle Ages in Spain, regarding the etymology of the word, which means "trick" (or to trick into false announcements) in Valencian, later migrating to France.

The Diccionari de Pompeu Fabra (1968) states that Truc is a game of cards usually played by four players, each receiving three cards and scoring points for winning two of the three tricks, and whose bluffing objective is to trick the opponent into conceding the number of points summed by the point value of two cards of the same suit under a vie, and in some variants of Truquiflor, by having Flor or a winning Flor (a group of three consecutive cards of the same suit) whose point value is higher than another.

Francesc de Borja i Moll, in his Diccionari Català (1993), offers a similar definition, recalling the hierarchy of the cards as: 3 2 A K Q J 9 8 7 6, and a brief entry on the Matarrata variant, a similar game in which the 7♦ ranks higher than 7♠, A♣ and A♠.

Truc is closely related to the old English game of Put, which was first described by Cotton in The Compleat Gamester (1674).

== Cards ==
In France it is played with a French-suited Piquet pack, the cards ranking 7 8 A R D V 10 9 in each suit, whereby R is the Roi (King), D the Dame (Queen) and V the Valet (Jack). The 8 is called the six. Sackson says that in some areas the Ace replaces the 8, the order then being 7 A R D V 10 9 8. The hierarchy applies across all 4 suits e.g. any Queen beats a Jack of any suit.

In Catalonia in Spain, Truc is played with a Spanish-suited pack of 40 cards ranking 3 2 1 R C S 7 6 5 4, whereby R is the Rei (King), C is the Cavall (Cavalier) and S the Sota (Jack).

== French Truc ==
The French game is played as follows:

Two players use a 32-card pack. A game is won when one player reaches 12 points, which may require several rounds. A rubber is the best of three games.

Players deal in turn with the first dealer being chosen by any agreed upon means. Each round, players are dealt 3 cards one at a time. The non-dealer may propose a redeal if the dealer agrees. The hands are put aside and each receives 3 new cards. Only one redeal may be made, and only if both players agree. There are three ways to win a round: win two of the three tricks, or win the first trick (if both players win one and the third is tied), or by making the opponent fold to a raise.

=== Play ===
The non-dealer leads the first trick and the winner of each trick leads the next. As Truc is a no-trump game, any card may be played by either player and tricks are taken by the highest card led regardless of suit. If both cards played are of equal ranks, the trick is then considered "spoilt", belonging to none of the players (but during scoring is effectively awarded to the player who captured the first trick of that hand), and the same leader leads the next. A round finishes when one player concedes or when three tricks have been completed. Whoever took two tricks, or whoever took the first if each took one, scores 1 point or whatever the value of the round may have been increased to. If all three tricks were spoilt, neither player scores points.

=== Score ===
By default, the winner of a round scores one point. However, before playing a trick, either player may offer to increase the value of a round by asking: "Two more?". The first such increase raises the value of the round from 1 point to 2, and subsequent increases add 2 more each, raising the value of the round from 2 to 4 to 6, and so on. If the other says: "Yes", play continues, if not that other throws their hand in, play ceases and the challenger scores whatever the round was worth before the challenger offered to raise. It is possible for both players to raise in the same trick (the leader before leading a trick, and, if accepted, the follower before replying). It is also legal to concede at any time, whether the other player has offered to increase or not.

Mon reste

An even more drastic raise may be made if either player on their turn declares: "My remainder" (Mon reste), thus jump-raising the value of the round to whatever they need to make 12. The opponent may either concede, in which case the increase does not take effect and the player that offered it scores the number of points the round was set at, or may themself announce "My remainder", in which case the player that wins the round wins the game.

=== Variations ===
A common way of playing allows a player to propose any increase in the value of a round. In a variation suggested by Sid Sackson in his book A Gamut of Games, raises are increased by player proposing to double the current value of the round (i.e. from 1 to 2 to 4 to 8, and so on), and a full game goes to 16 rather than 12 points.

== Partnership Truc ==
Four players sit crosswise in partnerships. The turn to deal and play is counter-clockwise. The dealer acts as governor for their partnership and eldest hand as governor for the dealer's own. Only eldest may propose an exchange, and only dealer may accept or refuse it. Eldest leads to the first trick, and each subsequent trick is led by the winner of the last, or by the previous leader if the trick is spoilt. Similarly, only the governor may accept or concede when an increase is proposed.

Throughout play, the governor's partner may indicate what card or cards they hold by means of conventional code or gestural signals, and the governor for their part may tell their partner what to play. Players may not reverse these roles. The holding of a Seven is indicated by a grin, an Eight by a wink, an Ace by a shrug. Naturally, the signaller will attempt to signal when their governor is looking and their opponents are not. An instruction may take the form: "Play the Seven", "Play low", "Leave it to me", and so on. Signals must be truthfully made, and instructions obeyed.

A trick is spoilt if the highest card played by one side is matched in rank by the highest card played by one of the other. In case of a tie-winning trick played by two partners, whichever of them led to it first, leads two the next, and if neither of them two led, the trick is then spoilt just as if one of the tied cards were played by the other side.

== See also ==
- Truco
- Mus
- Put
- Calabresella

== Bibliography ==
- Lanes, E. (1912) Nouveau Manuel Complet des Jeux de Cartes. Paris.
- Parlett, David (1992). Dictionary of Card Games. ISBN 0-19-869173-4
- Sackson, Sid (1969). A Gamut of Games. ISBN 0-486-27347-4
