= France Cartes =

French manufacturer of playing cards and games

- Industry: Playing cards, board games
- Headquarters: Saint-Max, France
- Products: Board Games, Card Games, Collectible Card Games and Playing Cards
- Website: cartamundi.fr/fr/

France Cartes Cartamundi is a manufacturer of playing cards and games that is based in France at Saint-Max. The company introduced the Ducale brand of playing cards in 1946 and became the largest playing card manufacturer in France in 1962 after acquiring their competitor, Grimaud. Other brands marketed by France Cartes include Shuffle, Carta Magic, Grimaud Cartomancie, and Éditions Dusserre. France Cartes was acquired by Cartamundi in 2014.

== Overview ==
The company also develops card games for promotional and marketing purposes as well as personalized cards. It works for publishing houses as well as major brands. France Cartes is a member of the Association of French Toy Creators and Manufacturers (l'Association des Créateurs et Fabricants de Jouets Français) and holder of the Living Heritage Enterprise (Entreprise du Patrimoine Vivant) label for the excellence of its artisanal and industrial know-how.

== Products ==
France Cartes Cartamundi specialises in the production and creation of cards:

- Traditional card packs (War Rummy, Bridge, French Tarot, Poker, Belote, etc.)
- Educational card packs
- Board games for children and families
- Magic card packs
- Traditional games
- Cards for cartomancy
- Collectible cards and stickers

== History ==
The history of the France Cartes Group begins with Baptiste-Paul Grimaud, who in 1848 bought the workshop of Master Cardmaker Arnould, established in Paris in 1750. In 1946, Jean-Marie Simon created the Ducale brand in Nancy, then in 1962, he bought the Grimaud company to become the number one cardmaker in France, France Cartes. In 1989, Yves Weisbuch took over the business which he had helped grow since 1962 as sales manager. With the takeover of Héron in 1994, France Cartes became Groupe France Cartes. Subsequently, other acquisitions were made, as in 2003 with that of Editions Dusserre, specializing in historical cards. In 2014, as part of its international expansion, the Cartamundi group acquired France Cartes, offering the French market a wider and more complete range of cards and gaming accessories.

== Grimaud, Master Cardmaker since 1848 ==
The quality of playing cards is the result of handed-down knowledge and results in clean graphics, smooth touch, optimal glide, perfect opacity, rounded corners, double-headed designs and formats adapted to the type of game.

It is therefore thanks to the demands of a master cardmaker over a period of 170 years, that Grimaud was able to develop ranges of card games for social use and tournaments. On the occasion of Grimaud's 170th birthday, the company worked with the French Football Federation to support the French team during the FIFA World Cup.

Two packs of 54 cards were specially designed for the event: a classic collector's pack in the colours of 'the Blues' (index, format and French portraits) and a pack with pictures of the players (index, format and French football players).

== Selection of board games ==
The following is a selection of France Cartes products:

- Cartatoto, 1996
- Color Addict, 2008
- Jack le Pirate
- Mikamo
- Big Bug Panic
- MimiQ fais la bonne Grimace
- Shuffle GO
- Grimaud Junior, 2017
- Origine line of playing cards (2018)
- Expert line of playing cards (2018)
- Official playing cards of the French Football Team (2018)
