= Kabufuda =

Japanese playing cards

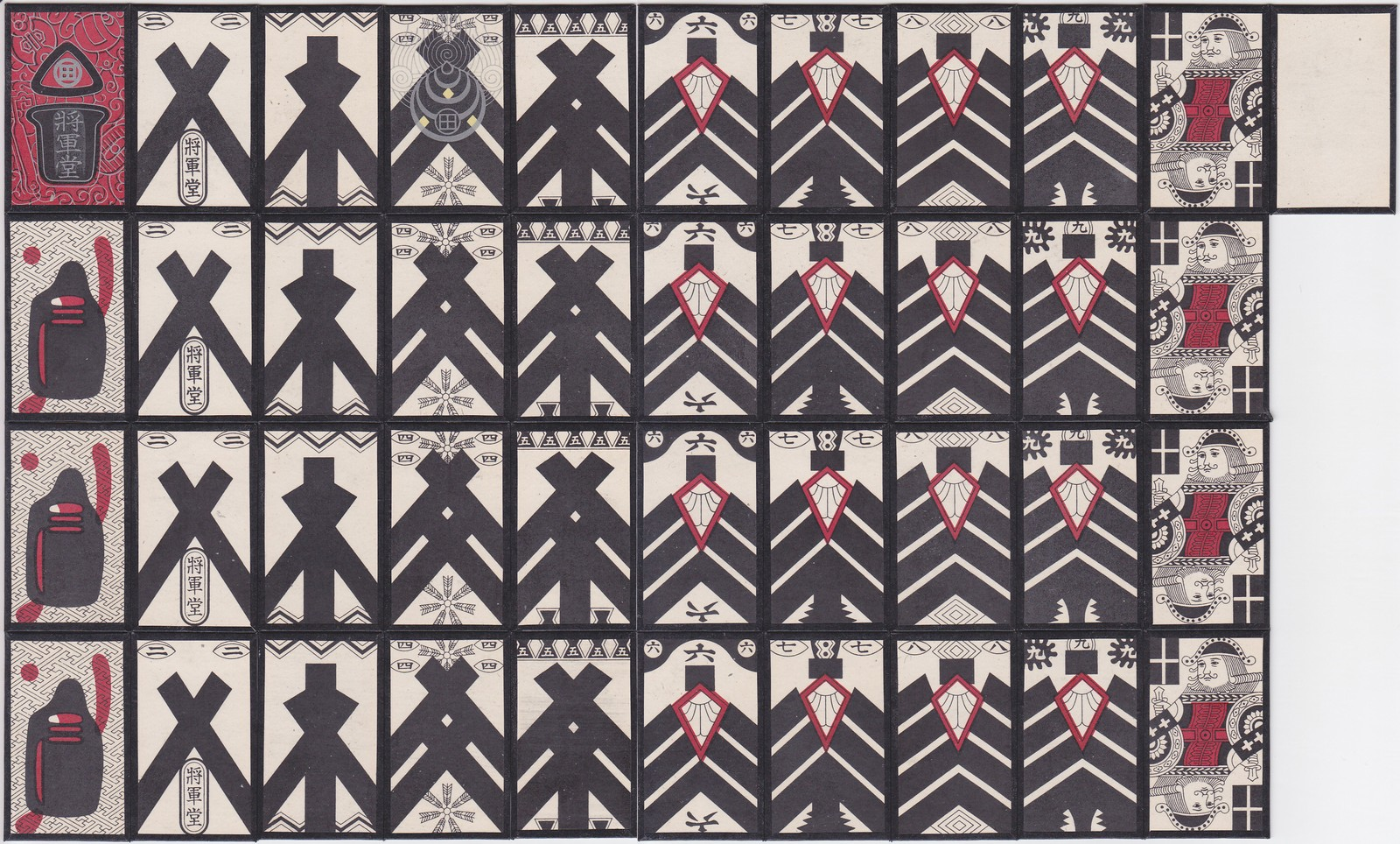
A standard kabufuda pattern deck

Kabufuda (株札(かぶふだ)) are Japanese playing cards used for gambling games such as Oicho-Kabu mainly used in the Kansai region.

Like the related hanafuda (lit. 'flower cards'), kabufuda is a descendant of mekuri karuta, which ultimately descends from 16th-century Portuguese playing cards. Since suits are irrelevant in kabu games, decks used for those games became single-suited during the 18th century. Like in baccarat, the object of most kabu games is to get a total closest to nine. Early kabufuda decks had three ranks of face cards but since they have no value, only the knaves were kept in most variants.

The word kabu is believed to derive from the Portuguese slang cavo meaning a stake, bet, or wager. Closely related are the gabo games played with Korean tujeon cards and the Indian Ganjapa game of komi.

== Cards ==
Kabufuda cards, like hanafuda, are smaller and stiffer than Western playing cards. The standard Kabufuda pattern deck contains 40 cards, representing the numbers 1 through 10, with four cards for each number. Additionally, a blank card is often included as a spare. Standard Kabufuda uses only the Latin suit of clubs from mekuri karuta and old Portuguese cards.

One of the 1's has a red background and is decorated gold or silver, called the Aka-pin (赤ピン 'red pin') or Aza-pin (アザピン 'Ace-pin') from Portuguese às pintas ('Ace spots'). The twos often have the manufacturer or distributor's trademark. One of the 4's is also decorated gold or silver, called the Tamashi (玉四 'round four') or Kinshi (金四 'gold four'), which allows it to have a special role in certain games.

== Variants ==
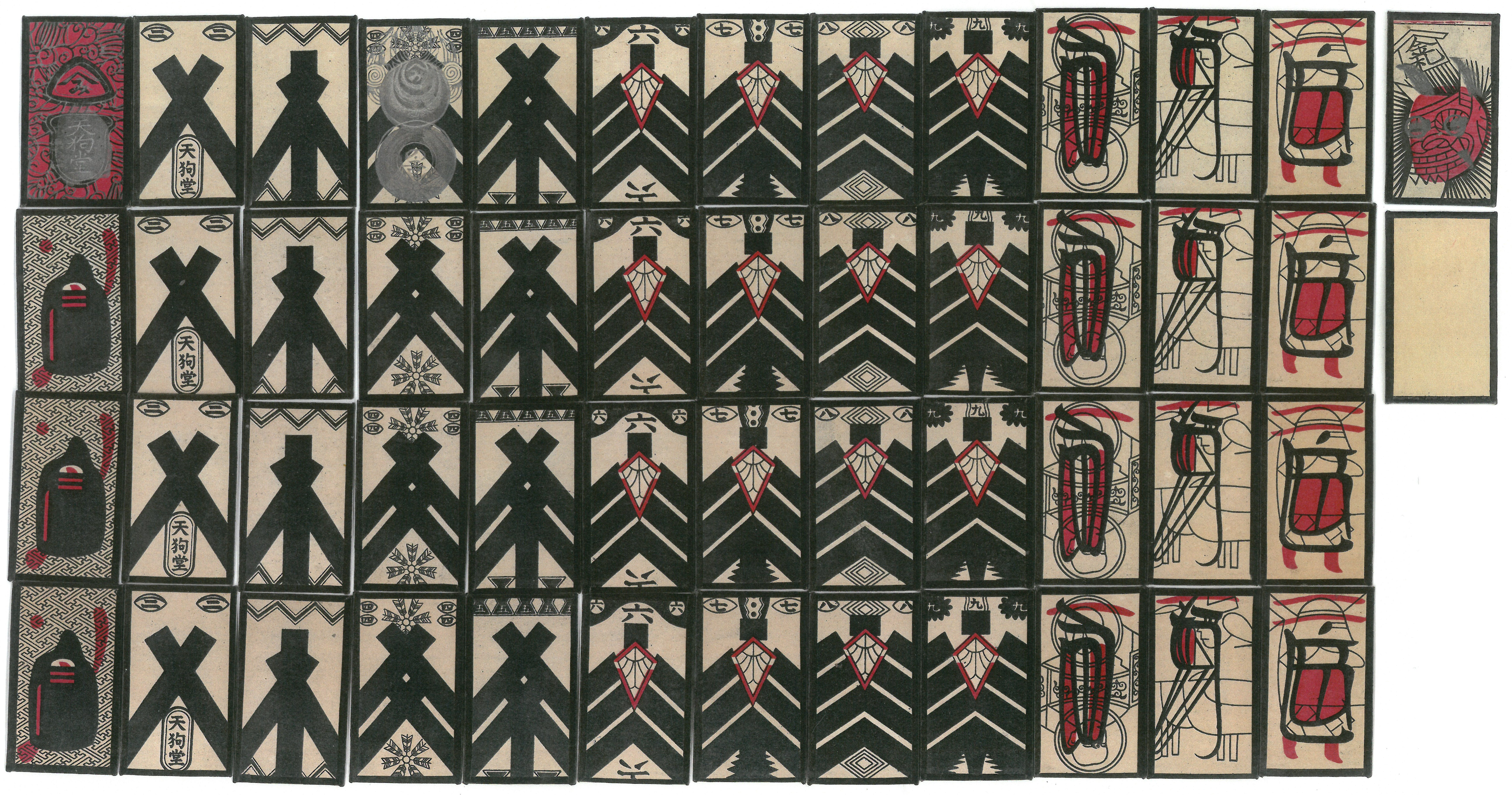
Iri no kichi deck, a variant of kabufuda with three different face cards

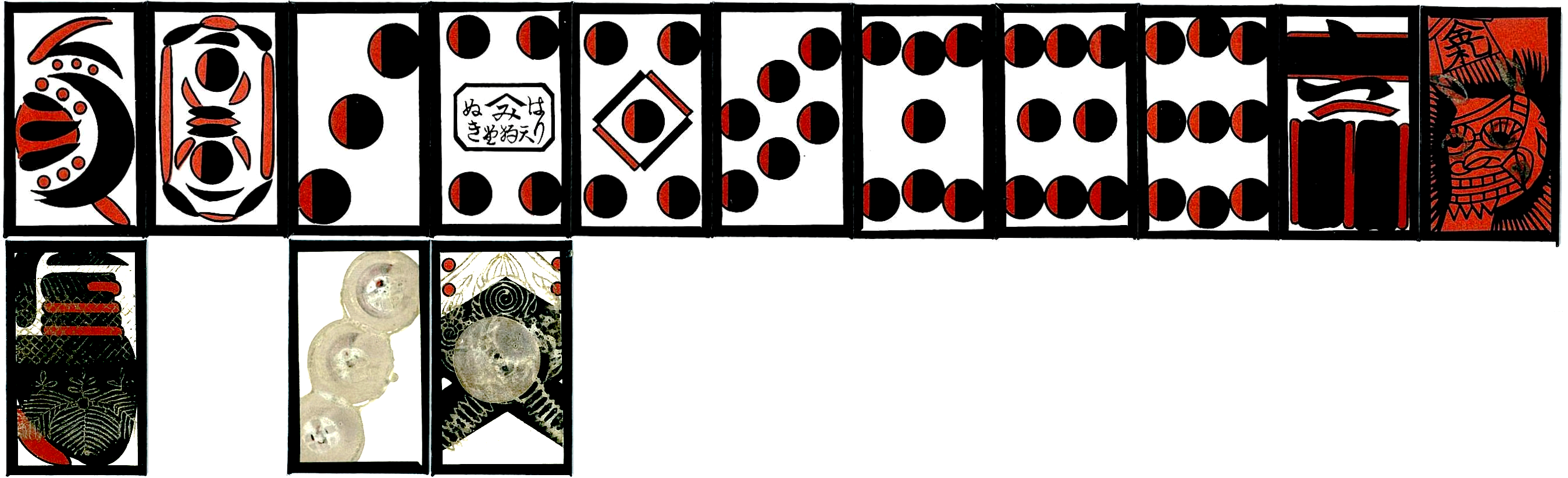
Komaru pattern deck. The cards on the bottom are variations on the corresponding cards above.

Iri no kichi (入の吉) is a local variant of kabufuda where all three face cards from mekurifuda are retained, also featuring a knight and king alongside the knave, for a total of 48 cards. Many decks additionally include an oni card that acts as a wild card. Unlike standard kabufuda cards, modern iri no kichi cards typically remain close to the old face card designs from the pre-modern Edo period.

Other small single-suited regional card patterns such as "Komaru" (小丸), "Mefuda" (目札), and "Daini" (大二) may also be classified as Kabufuda. These patterns are based on the Latin coin suit, have one of their 3's specially decorated, and they also have an additional oni wild card.

== Games ==
=== Oicho-Kabu ===
Oicho-Kabu (おいちょかぶ) is similar to baccarat where players add up the numbers and compete based on the size and strength of the cards. There is no limit on number of players. The name comes from kabu game terms for 8 and 9, the two highest scores one can have (disregarding special hands), which are believed to be derived from the Portuguese words oito ("eight") and cabo ("end").

=== Kyokabu ===
Kyokabu (京カブ) has no limit on number of players and is a variant of Oicho-Kabu with a few distinct differences:

- The starting first cards for each tableau are always 5, 6, 7, and 8.
- Players can only bet on one of the four tableaus.
- For special yaku, the Arashi (アラシ) does not beat the dealer's Kuppin (クッピン). Also, there is no Shippin (シッピン).
- Combinations resulting in value 0 are considered ties in which the bets are returned to the players.

=== Hikikabu/Uchikabu ===
Hikikabu (引きカブ) or Uchikabu (打ちカブ) is a game for 2 to 5 players. Players pay an ante and is dealt their own hand of two (or three) cards. Hand values are the same as in Oicho-Kabu, except there is no Shippin. After all cards are dealt, players can either fold or add to the pot. There is a showdown for those who didn't fold, and the pot is split depending on the results.

=== Bopin/Boni ===
Bopin (ボーピン) or Boni (ボーニ) is a variant of Hikikabu that uses 48 cards (including the horse and the warrior) for two to five players. The twelve face cards are called "Boue" (亡絵 or ぼうえ) and the Ace is called a "Pin" (ピン). All the Boue are value 10. The gameplay is the same as in Hikikabu, except if the dealer draws both a Boue and a Pin, then it is called a "Bopin Kakitakuri" (ボーピン掻きたくり) and the dealer wins unconditionally. If the dealer draws all three Boue, it is called "San Boue Warai" (三亡笑い) and the player with the highest total value wins. There is also an optional rule called "Boni" (ボーニ) in which the dealer wins even if he draws a Boue and a 2.

=== San-mai kabu ===
San-mai kabu (三枚カブ), like Bopin, uses 48 cards. There is no limit on number of players. Three sets of three cards are placed on the table and players are asked to place their bets. The dealer prepares three cards for themself, and the values are determined. If the player wins, the dealer pays four times the bet. If the player loses, the bet is forfeited to the dealer.

=== Go-mai kabu ===
Go-mai kabu (五枚カブ) for up to eight people is similar to Pai gow where players are dealt five cards and try to form two hands: one which is a multiple of 10, and the other whose value is closest to 9.

=== Ju-mai kabu/Sumou-tori kabu ===
Ju-mai kabu (十枚カブ) is mainly played in the Shikoku region and in the Hokuriku region it is called Sumou-tori kabu (相撲取りカブ). There is no limit to the number of players. Ten cards are laid out on the table. Players are asked to place bets on the cards, and the dealer prepares two cards for themself. The dealer deals one card to the table, and the totals are compared. If the players win, the dealer pays four times their bet. If the player loses, the bet is confiscated by the dealer.

=== Ei-me-tsukuri/Kabu tsukuri ===
Ei-me-tsukuri (エイ目作り) or Kabu tsukuri (カブ作り) is for up to five players, with each player being dealt nine or ten cards. Each player makes three sets of three cards; for players with ten cards, the remaining card is not used in the game. The three sets are placed face-down vertically in front of each player. Players pay the ante and the cards in their top row are turned face-up so that a winner can be determined. Players do the same with their middle, and bottom rows. Players compete against each other, not against the dealer.

=== Dare ===
Dare (誰), for two to four players, uses 39 cards (excluding the red pin). Each player is dealt nine cards, and the remaining three are exposed to the table. The sum modulo ten of the cards on the table is the standard value. Players make three sets of three cards, attempting to make each set the standard value. If they fail to do so, the remaining cards' sum modulo ten becomes their value. Players compare results with each other to determine a winner.

=== Sashikomi/Yubi e ===
Sashikomi (指込) or Yubi e (指絵), like Bopin, uses 48 cards. It is for two players. Each player is dealt three cards, and their totals determine the winner. Players may discard a card to draw a card from the deck.

=== Takame ===
Takame (高目), like Bopin, uses 48 cards. There is no limit to the number of players. The dealer places two cards face-down and players bets on one of them. In the case of a tie, additional cards are drawn to determine a new total.

=== Jumoku ===
In Jumoku (十目), players pay an ante before being dealt two cards and comparing results. The sum modulo ten of 0 is the highest, instead of 9.

=== Karafuto kabu ===
Karafuto kabu (樺太カブ) has no limit on number of players. The game uses cards ranked 1 to 6. The dealer places a card face-down and players try to guess the number by writing it down before placing their bet. If the player wins, the dealer pays four times the bet. If the player loses, the dealer confiscated the bet.

=== Kachi-Kachi ===
Kachi-Kachi (かちかち) for two to six players uses half the deck and is similar to blackjack mixed with poker where players try to get their total modulo ten closest to nine. Unlike Oicho-Kabu, there are three rounds of betting and players have their own hand of two cards which can be improved upon with a total modulo ten of zero.

=== King ===
King (きんご) derived from the Portuguese quinze (English: "fifteen") for up to seven people that plays the same as blackjack with a goal of 15 instead of 21. There are two special hands: three 5's which triples the players bet, and a 4, 5, and 6 which doubles it.
