= Batons (suit) =

Latin playing card suit

- Symbol from Trentine pattern
- Native names: Italian: Bastoni; Japanese: パオ; Portuguese: Paus; Spanish: Bastos
- Decks: Spanish-suited playing cards; Italian-suited playing cards; Portuguese-suited playing cards; Kabufuda
- Invented: 15th century

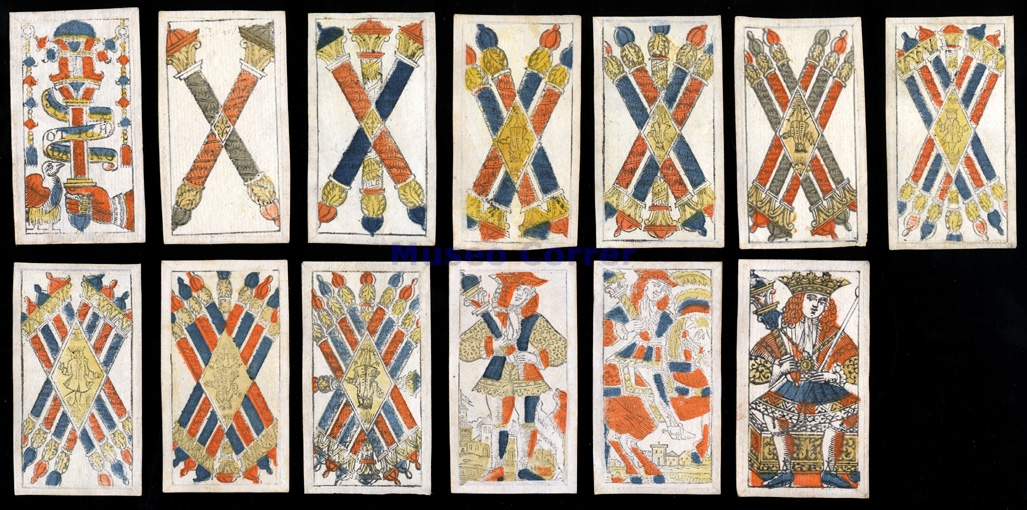
Suit of batons from an 18th-century Venetian card game.

Batons or clubs is one of the four suits of playing cards in the standard Latin deck along with the suits of cups, coins and swords. 'Batons' is the name usually given to the suit in Italian-suited cards where the symbols look like batons. 'Clubs' refers to the suit in Spanish-suited cards where the symbols look more like wooden clubs.

Before 1800, French cardmakers, who also made Spanish card games, called them cartes à bâtons. Symbol on Italian pattern cards: Symbol on Spanish pattern cards: Symbol on French Aluette (Spanish-)pattern cards:

== Characteristics ==
The suit of batons is believed to have derived from Chinese money-suited cards' String of cash coins suit being misinterpreted as polo-sticks by the Muslims when the cards came into contact with the Islamic world. This misinterpretation as sticks is also the case for Mahjong's suit of Bamboo sticks. Since polo was an obscure sport in Europe, the sticks further developed into cudgels in Spain and batons in Italy.

The interpretation and arrangement of the pips helps to subdivide the Latin-suit systems:

- Italian-suited: Intersecting batons
- Spanish-suited: Non-intersecting cudgels (normally with exception of the Three of Clubs)
- Portuguese-suited: Intersecting cudgels

In Spanish, the batons are called bastos; and in Italian, bastoni. In cartomancy and occultist circles, the suit of batons is usually called the suit of wands.

Portuguese-suited playing cards were traded to Japan in the mid-16th century which influenced the development of Karuta where the 48-card Komatsufuda, 75-card Unsun Karuta, and 40-card Kabufuda decks still maintain this suit.

== Gallery ==
=== Spanish pattern ===
The gallery below shows a suit of clubs from a Spanish-suited deck of 48 cards. The pack is of the Castilian pattern:

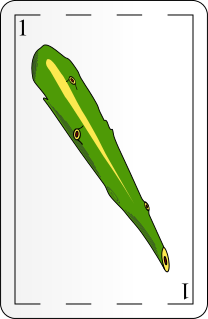
Ace

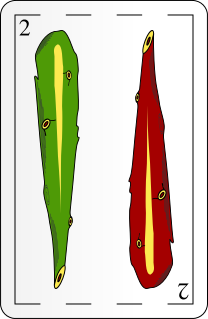
2

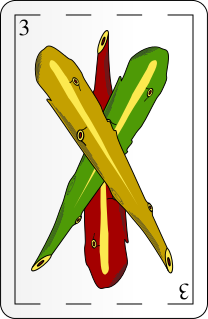
3

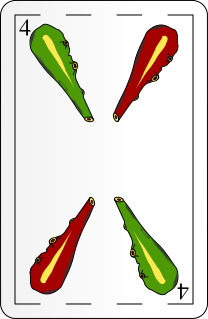
4

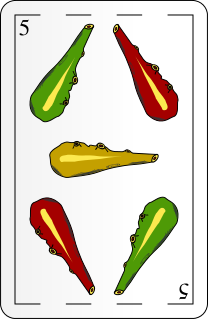
5

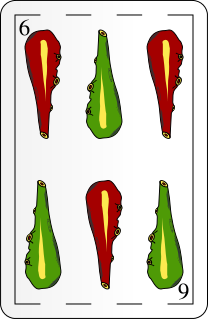
6

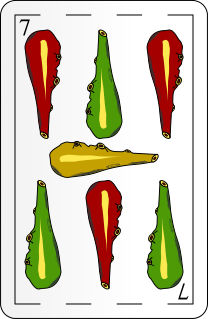
7

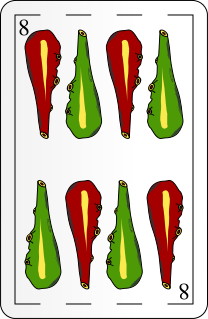
8

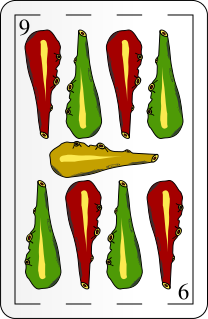
9

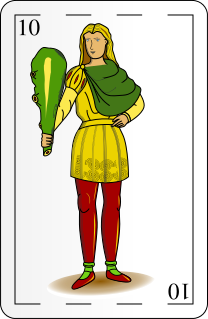
Sota

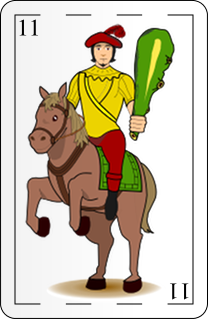
Caballo

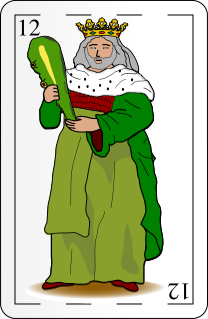
Rey

=== Italian pattern ===
The gallery below shows a suit of batons from an Italian-suited deck of 52 cards. The pack is of the Bresciane pattern:

Ace

2

3

4

5

6

7

8

9

10

Fante

Cavallo

Re

=== Komatsufuda pattern ===
The image below shows a suit of clubs from a Komatsufuda deck of 48 cards:

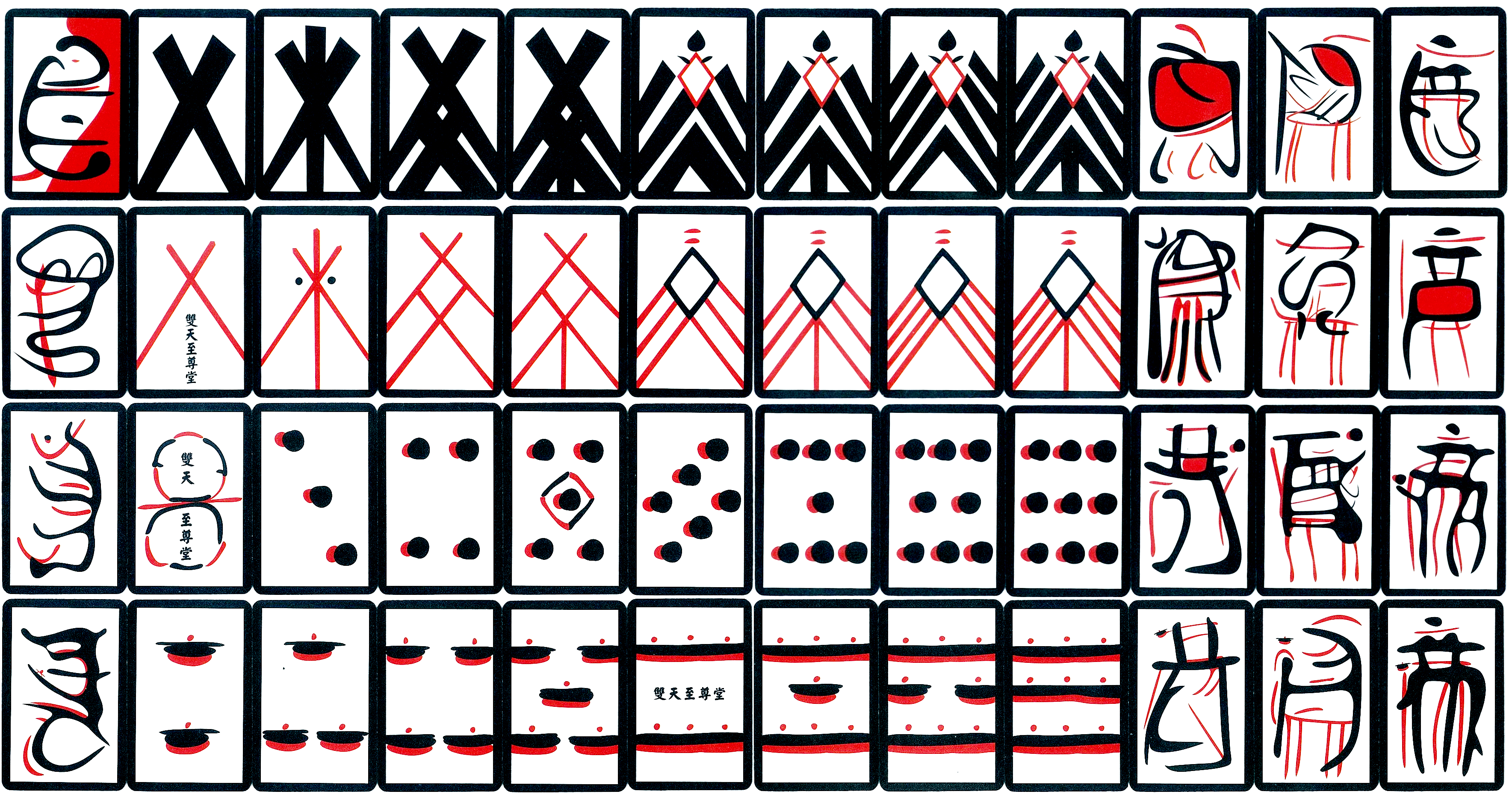
Ace, 2, 3, 4, 5, 6, 7, 8, 9, Knave, Knight, King

=== Unsun karuta pattern ===
The image below shows a suit of clubs from an Unsun karuta deck of 75 cards:

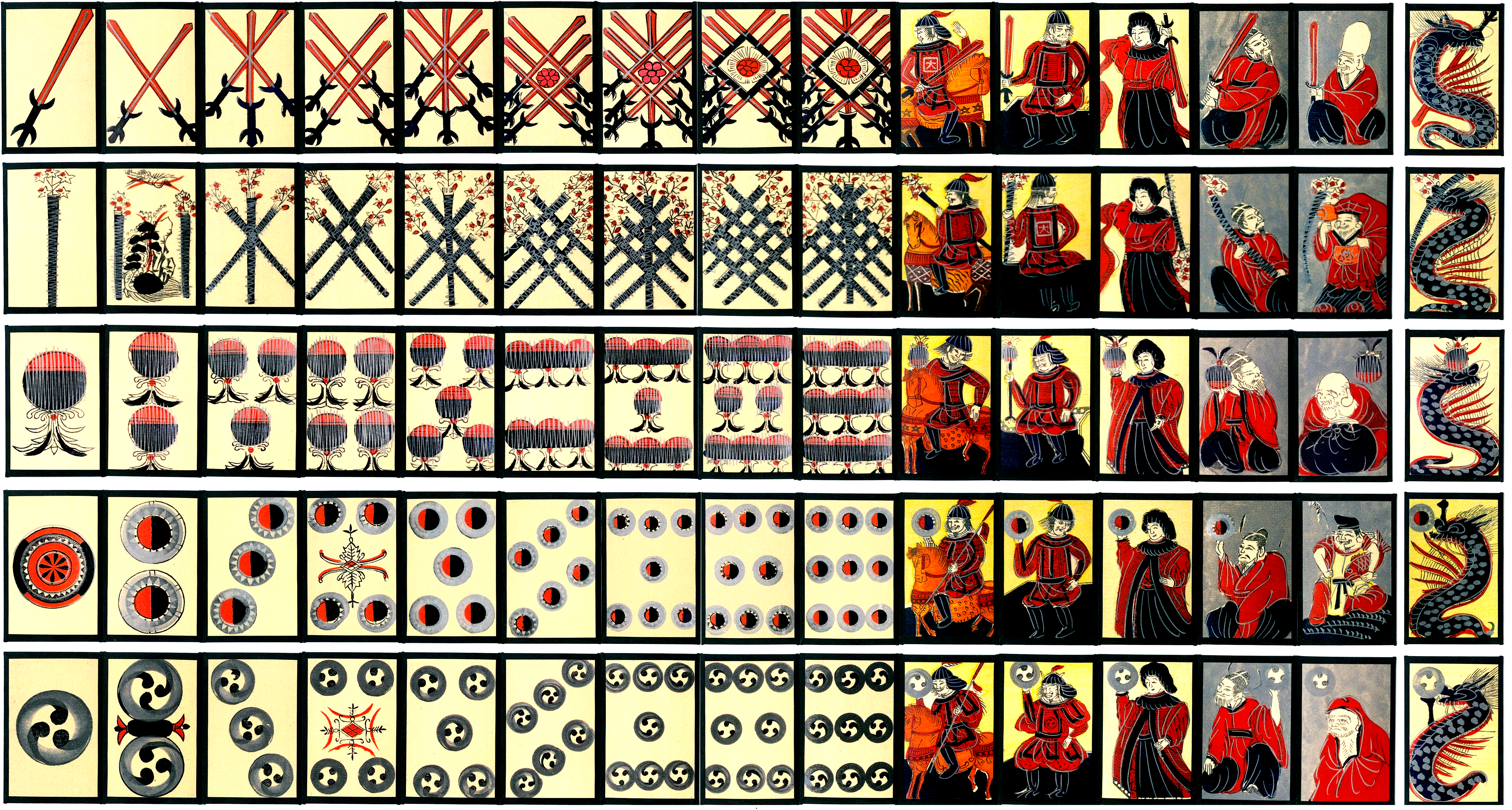
Ace, 2, 3, 4, 5, 6, 7, 8, 9, Knight, King, Female Knave, Sun, Un, Dragon

=== Kabufuda pattern ===
The gallery below shows a suit of clubs from a Kabufuda deck of 40 cards:

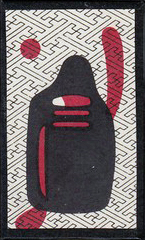
1

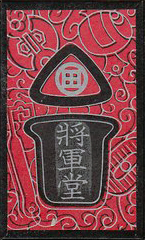
1 (alt)

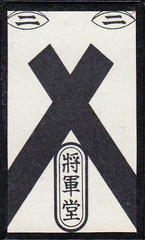
2

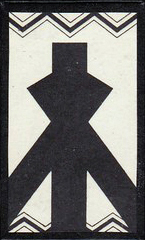
3

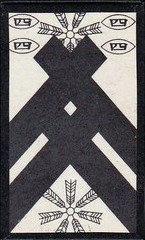
4

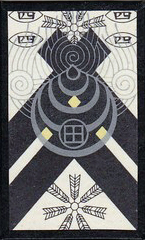
4 (alt)

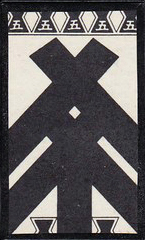
5

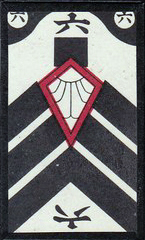
6

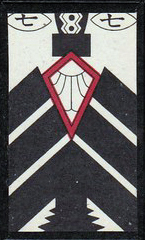
7

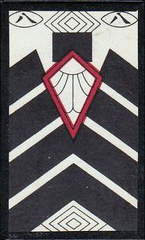
8

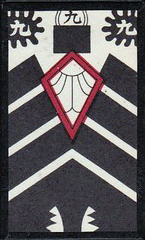
9

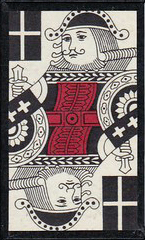
10

== See also ==
- Spanish playing cards
- Italian playing cards
- Suit of wands – suit used in divinatory tarot cards and tarot card readings
