= Coins (suit) =

Playing card and mahjong tile suit

- Symbol from Trentine pattern
- Native names: Chinese: 銅錢, Chinese: 文, or Chinese: 筒子; Indonesian: Koin; Italian: Denari; Japanese: オウル or Japanese: ピンズ; Malay: Batik; Portuguese: Ouros; Spanish: Oros; Vietnamese: Văn
- Decks: Money-suited playing cards; Spanish-suited playing cards; Italian-suited playing cards; Portuguese-suited playing cards; Mahjong tiles
- Invented: 13th-14th century

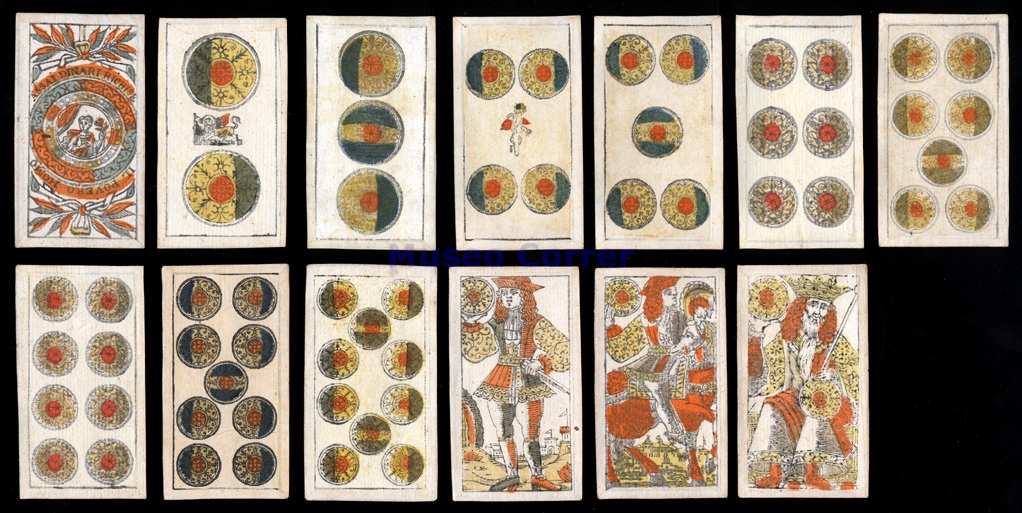
The suit of coins from an 18th-century Venetian pack

The suit of coins is one of the four card suits used in Latin-suited playing cards alongside swords, cups and batons. These suits are used in Spanish, Italian and some tarot card packs. This suit has maintained its original identity from Chinese money-suited cards, where in English it may also be referred to as the suit of cash. The suit also occurs in Mahjong tiles where it may be called a variety of different other names. Symbol on Italian pattern cards: Symbol on Spanish pattern cards: Symbol on French aluette cards:

== Characteristics ==
The coin suit may have originated from pips on dice (similar to Chinese dominoes) or as a play money substitute for paper money in use for gambling. During the Tang dynasty, dice games were popular for gambling and scrolls were used as a reference material for the rules and combinations. However, scrolls were found inconvenient and eventually replaced by "Yeh-tsă" (translated "leaves," like the leaves of a book), in which the hypothesis states they became synonymous for dice and eventually replaced them.

Lu Rong's (1436–1494) account of the Chinese money-suited 40-card Madiao deck has the suit of coins as Cash with ranks one to nine. Korean poet Jang Hon (1759-1828) wrote that the Madiao game dates even earlier, back to the Yuan dynasty (1271-1368). The ranks are in reverse order with the lower numbers ranking greater than the higher numbers. This features in many other early card games like Ganjifa, Tarot, Ombre, and Maw. By the late 16th-century, the suit of Cash added two more cards, the Half Cash and Zero Cash. The Zero Cash being the highest-ranked card of the suit due to the reverse ordering was marked red to easily identify it during games. During the 18th and 19th centuries, these two cards became suitless and took on new identities as the White Flower and Red Flower respectively. Mahjong tiles derived from money-suited decks in the middle of the 19th century and retains the coin or circles suit. The Hakka's Six Tigers deck, Vietnamese Tổ tôm and Bài chòi decks, Thailand's Pai Tai deck, and Malaysia, Singapore, and Indonesia's Ceki deck all maintain the Chinese money-suit of coins. To dissociate themselves from the gambling, these cards either have abstract designs for their pips or are identified purely by text.

By the 11th century, playing cards were spreading throughout the Asian continent and later came into Egypt, where it would develop into Mamluk Kanjifa. Kanjifa, in turn, would further spread to Europe sometime in the 14th century inspiring the design of the latin-suited playing cards. There are many variants of Kanjifa/Ganjifa. One of which is the Moghul Ganjifa, where two of the eight suits feature coins: "Safed" (silver coins) which ascends from 1 to 10, and "Surkh" (gold coins) which descends from 10 to 1.

Spanish coin pips
Castilian
Cádiz
Modern Catalan
French Aluette
Piacentine
Romagnole
Sicilian
Neapolitan
Sardinian

In Spain, the suit of coins is known as oros (golds) and the court cards are known as the rey (king), caballo ("horse"-knight or cavalier) and sota ("under"-knave or valet). The Spanish play with packs of 40 or 48 cards. There are no tens and, in the shorter pack, the nines and eights are also dropped. Thus the suit of coins ranks: R C S (9 8) 7 6 5 4 3 2 1. In the French vendée where they play aluette with a special pattern of 48 Spanish-suited cards, the suit is called denier and the courts are known as the roi, cavalière (female cavalier), and valet (jack).

Italian coin pips
Bergamasche
Trevigiane
Triestine
Trentine
Bresciane
Bolognesi

In Italy, the suit is known as denari (money) and the corresponding court cards are the re (king), cavallo (cavalryman), and fante (infantryman). The depiction of the pips is noticeably redder than the golden yellow of Spanish pips. Either 40 or 52-card packs are used. In the shorter packs, the tens, nines and eights are removed. Card ranking is thus: R C F (10 9 8) 7 6 5 4 3 2 1.

Portuguese coin pips
Sicilian tarot
Unsun karuta
Komatsufuda

Portuguese-suited playing cards were traded to Japan in the mid-16th century which influenced the development of Karuta where the 48-card Komatsufuda and 75-card Unsun Karuta decks still maintain this suit.

The suit of coins is also one of the four suits in tarot card packs used for tarot card readings and other cartomancy.

== Gallery ==
=== Spanish pattern ===
The gallery below shows a suit of coins from a Spanish-suited deck of 48 cards. The pack is of the Castilian pattern:

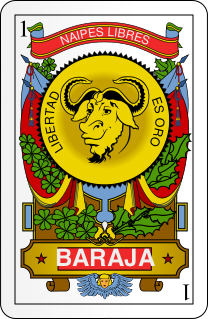
Ace

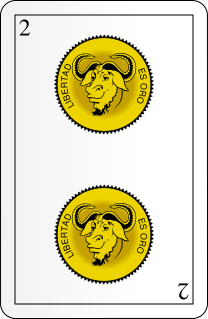
2

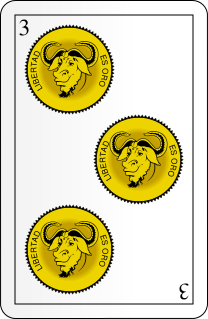
3

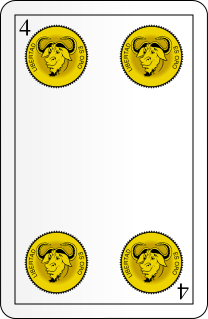
4

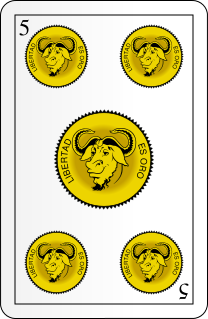
5

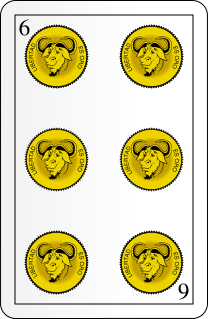
6

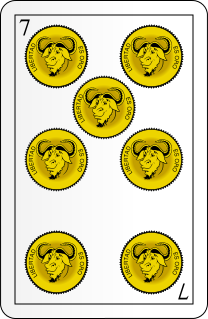
7

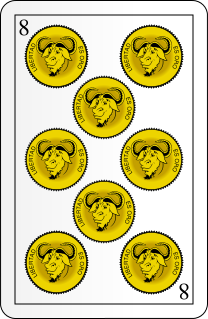
8

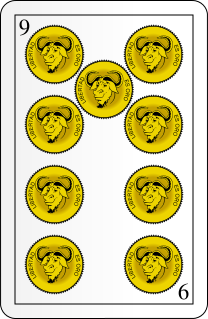
9

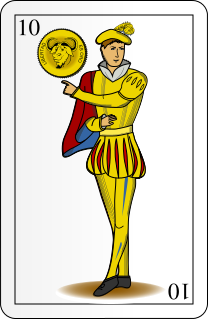
Sota

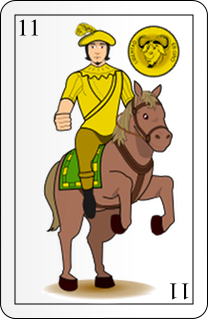
Caballo

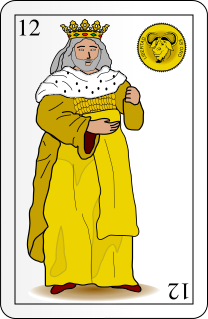
Rey

=== Italian pattern ===
The gallery below shows a suit of coins from an Italian-suited deck of 52 cards. The pack is of the Bresciane pattern:

Ace

2

3

4

5

6

7

8

9

10

Fante

Cavallo

Re

=== Mahjong pattern ===
The gallery below shows a suit of coins from a Mahjong set of 144 tiles.

Between 1860 – 1880, this suit was called Chinese: 同 "tóng", shortened from Chinese: 铜 meaning "copper" as in the copper cash. After 1890, the suit became more frequently called Chinese: 筒子 "tǒng zǐ" meaning "bamboo tube". The Japanese also spell this suit as Japanese: 筒子, but pronounce it Japanese: ピンズ "pìńzú" from the Mandarin alternate spelling Chinese: 餅子 "bǐngzi", meaning "cake". When Mahjong was introduced to the West, its unfamiliarity lead to this suit having a variety of other names like: "dots," "wheels," "circles," or "balls."

=== Ceki pattern ===
The gallery below shows a suit of coins from a Ceki deck of 60 cards. Also included are the red and white flowers:

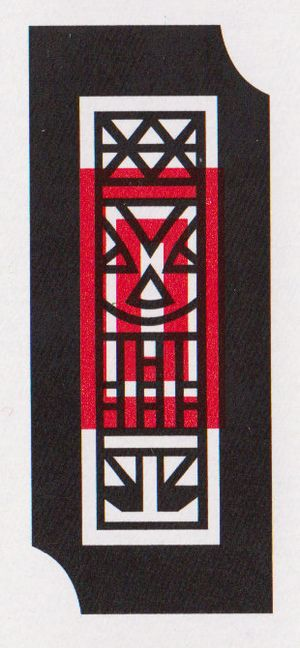
Red Flower

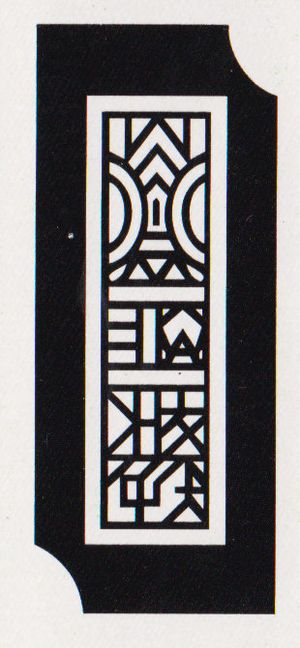
White Flower

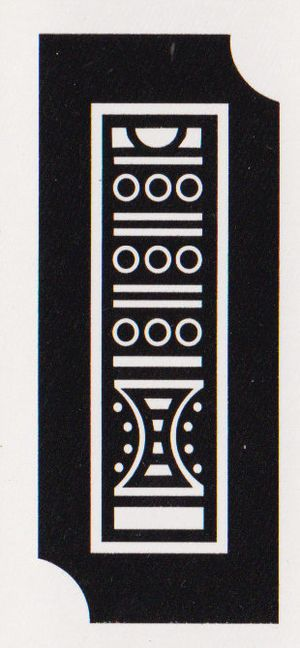
1

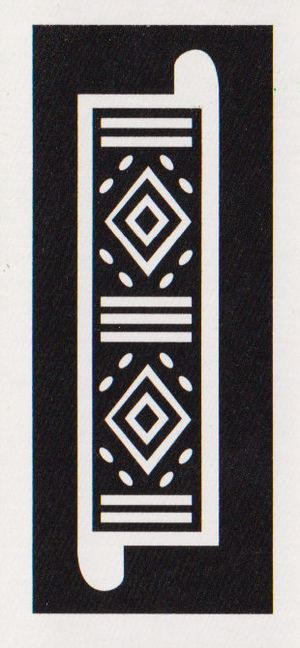
2

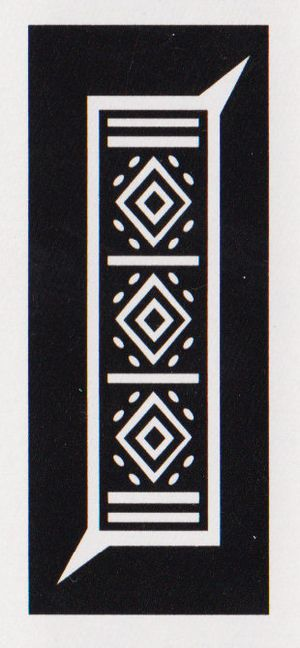
3

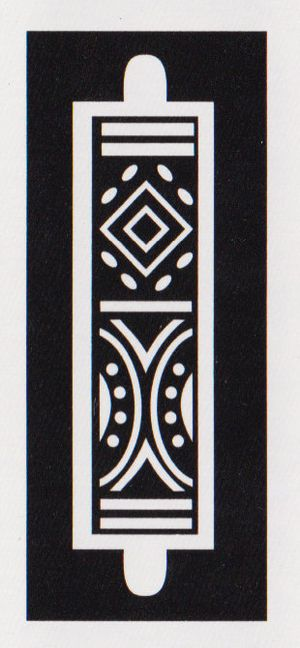
4

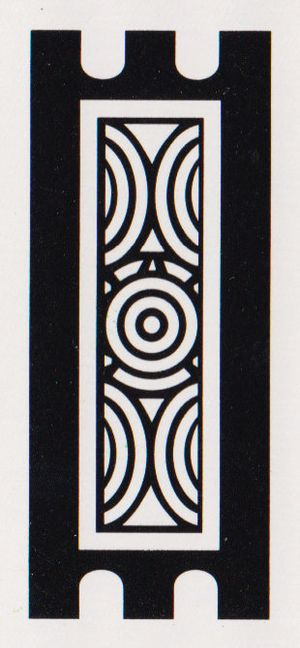
5

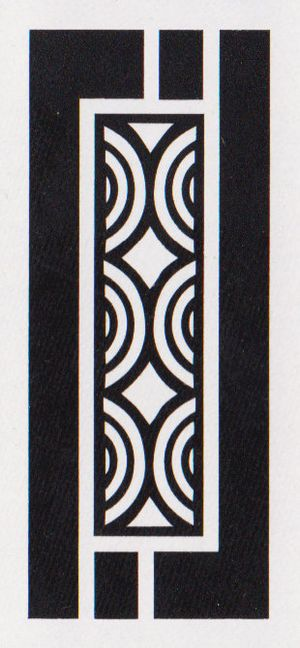
6

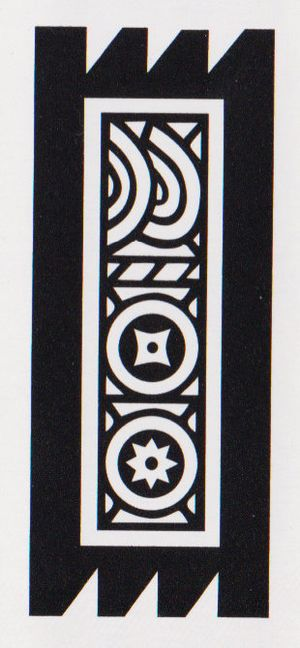
7

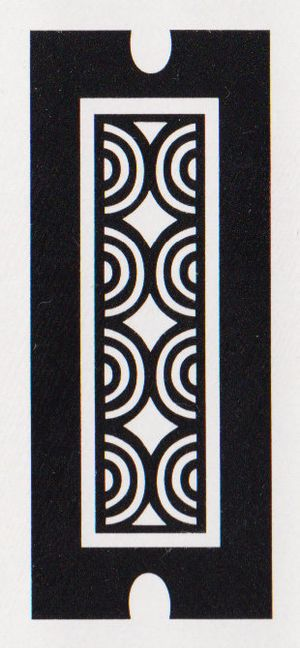
8

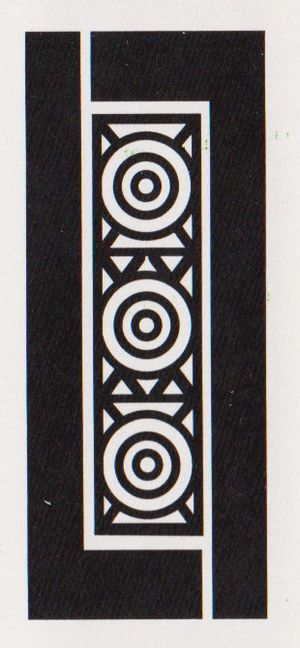
9

=== Pai Tai pattern ===
The images below shows the red and white flowers and the suit of coins from Thailand's Pai Tai deck of 60 cards:

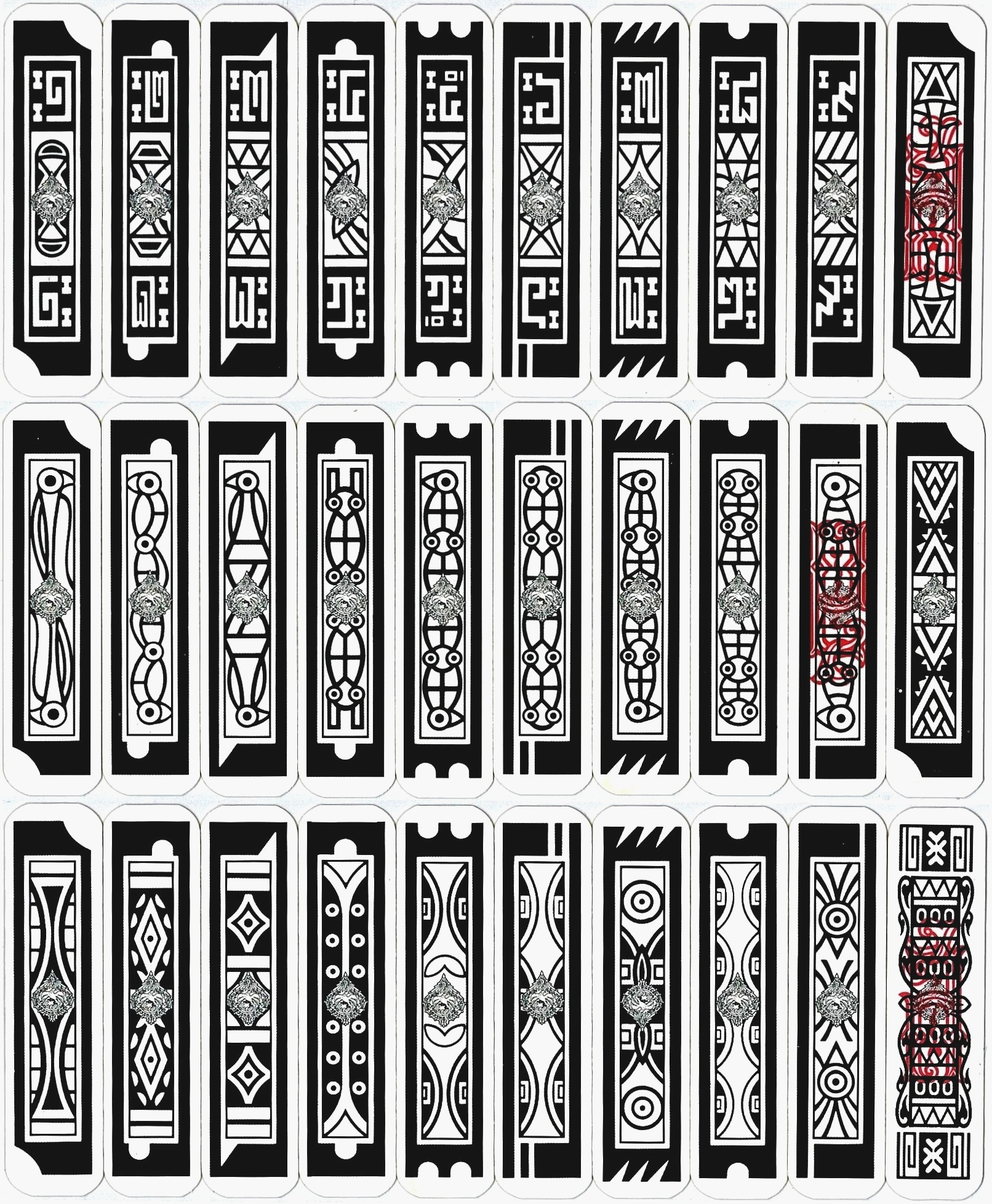
Red Flower
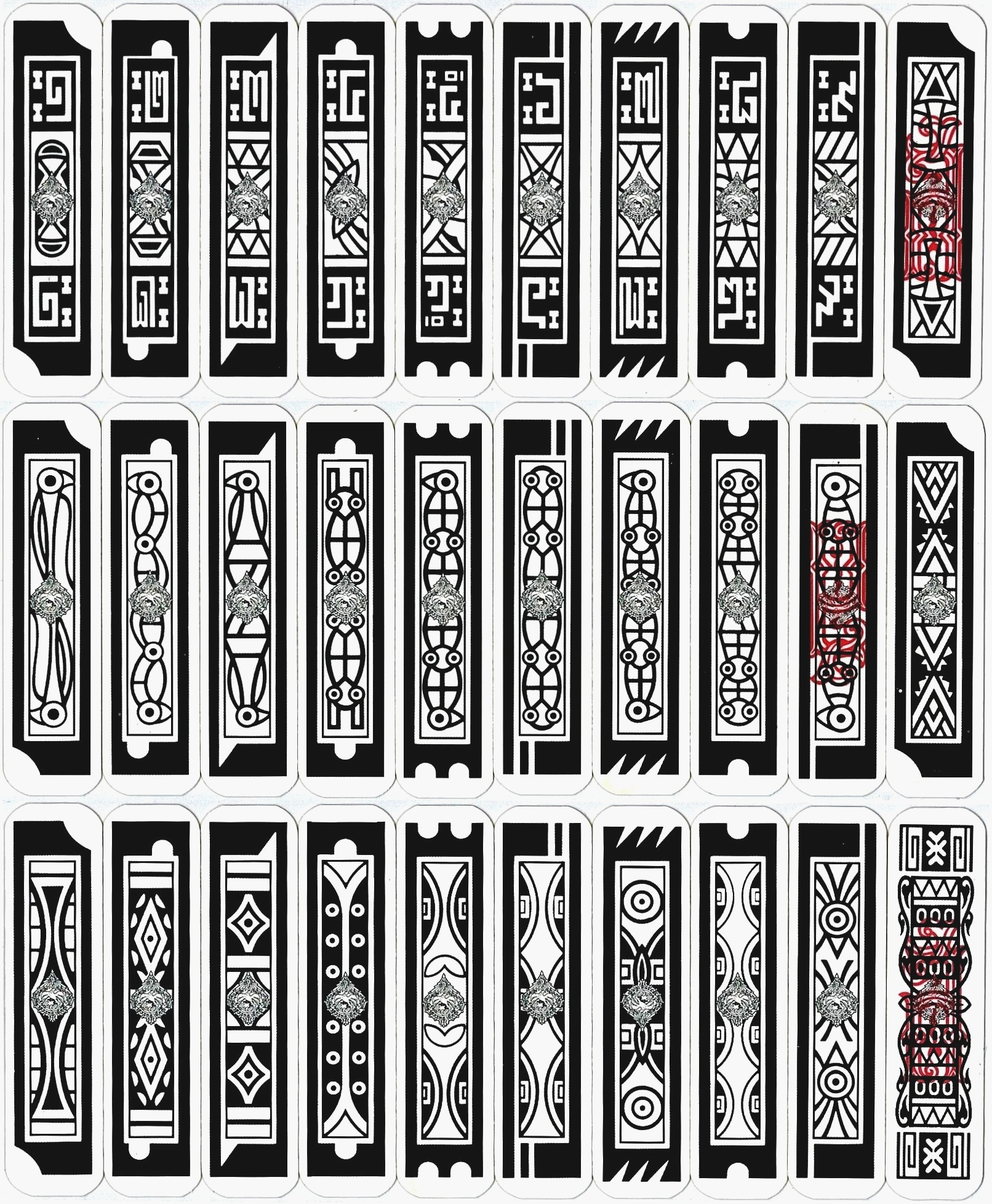
White Flower
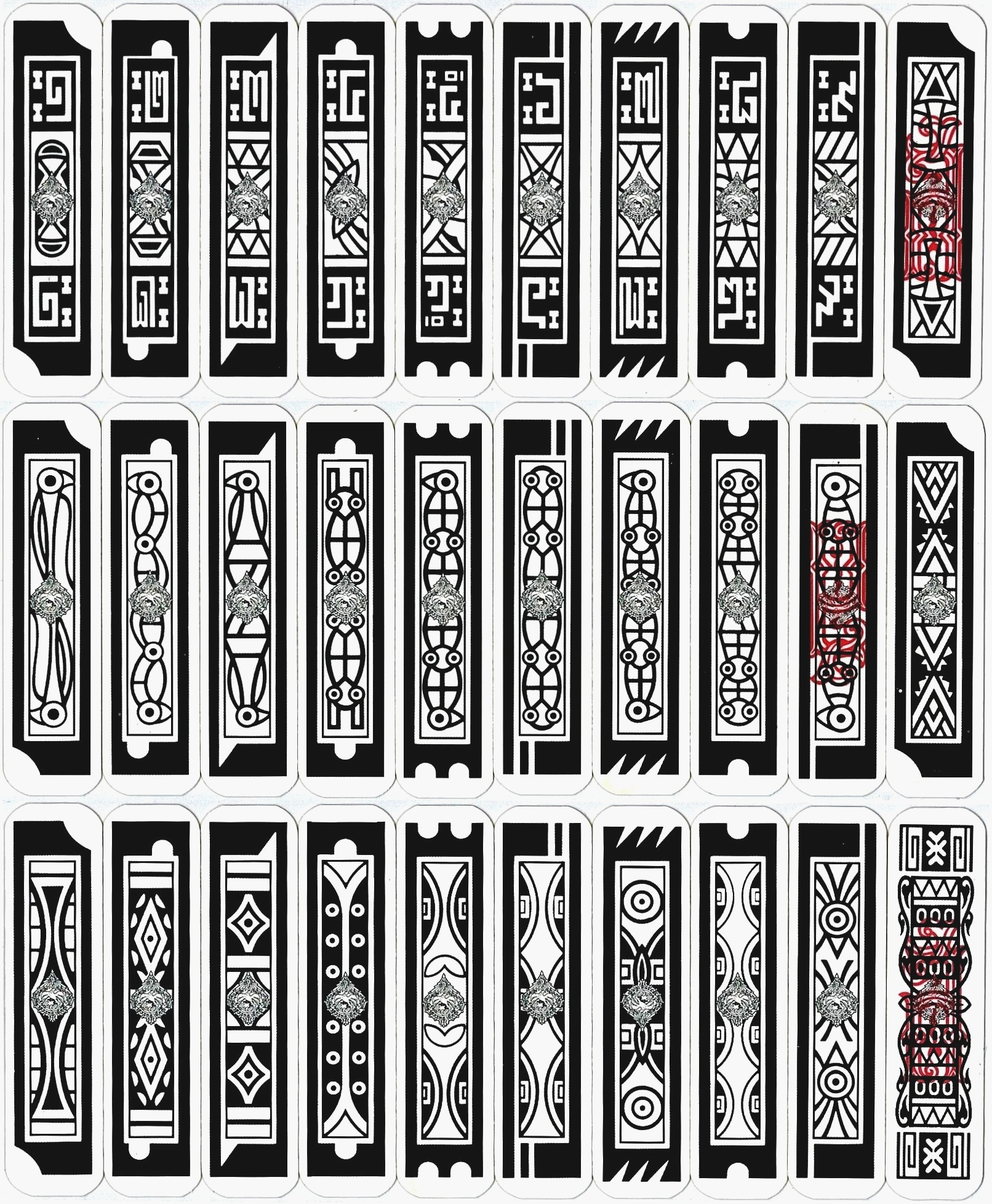
1, 2, 3, 4, 5, 6, 7, 8, 9

=== Six Tigers pattern ===
The image below shows a suit of coins from a Sichuan Six Tigers deck of 36 cards. The suit's name is written as (Chinese: 戋), simplified from the character (Chinese: 錢; pinyin: qián) meaning "money." The 9-ranked cards of this deck all have red markings.

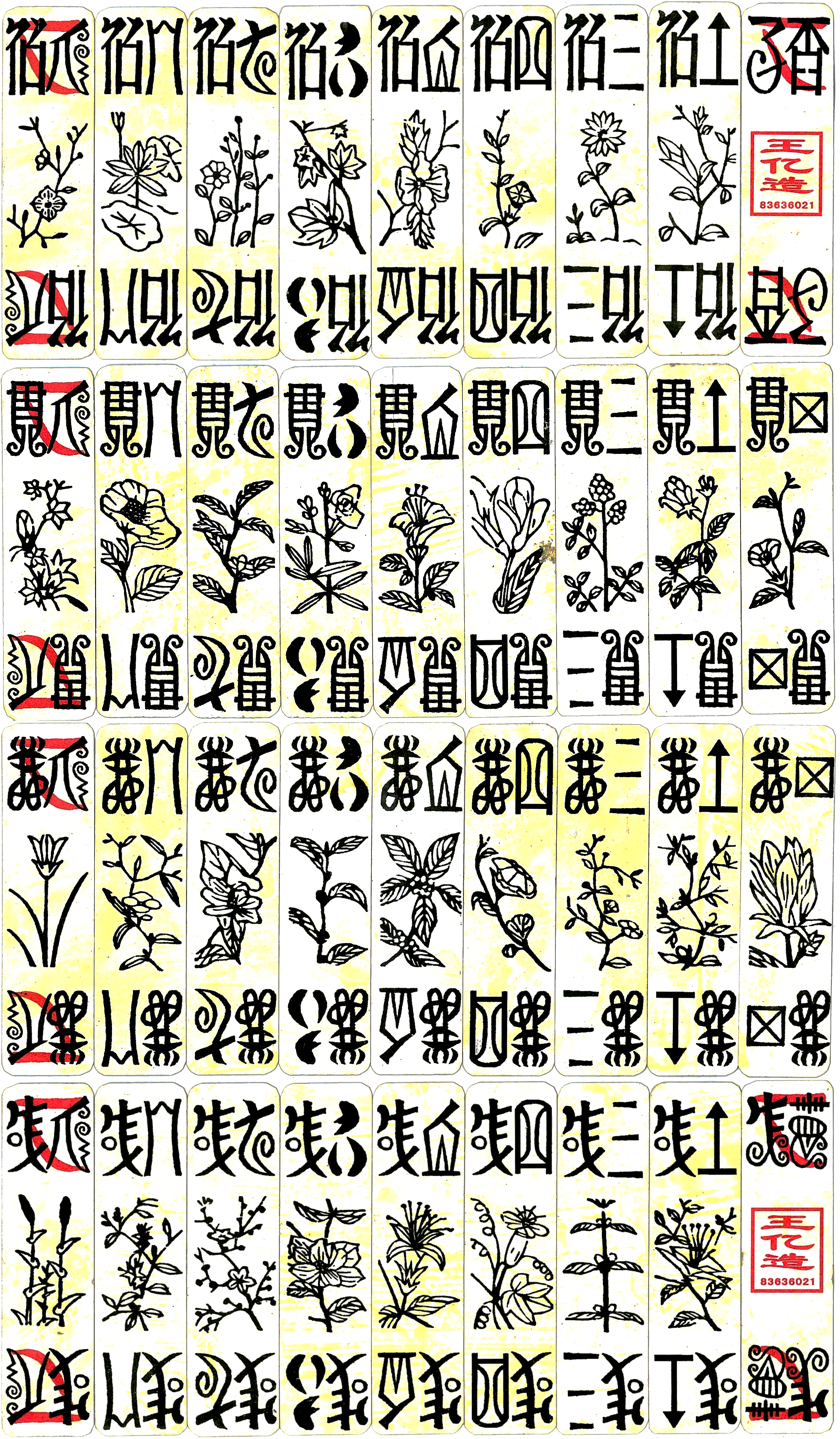
9 (戋九), 8 (戋八), 7 (戋七), 6 (戋六), 5(戋五), 4 (戋四), 3 (戋三), 2 (戋二), 1 (戋一)

=== Tổ tôm pattern ===
The image below shows a suit of coins from a Tổ tôm deck of 120 cards. The suit's name is written as (Chinese: 文; pinyin: wén) meaning "Chinese cash (currency unit)." For this deck, the top two highest-ranked cards of each suit are marked red, which explains why the Half-Cash card has the marking. However, the Zero Cash card was promoted to the String suit, thus becoming the Zero String and no longer being part of the Coin suit (there are no suit distinction in the names of the "yêu đỏ" cards in tổ tôm, the zero cash is called thang thang (湯湯) and the half cash is called chi chi (枝枝). However, due to the gameplay, both half cash and zero cash belongs to the Coins suit)

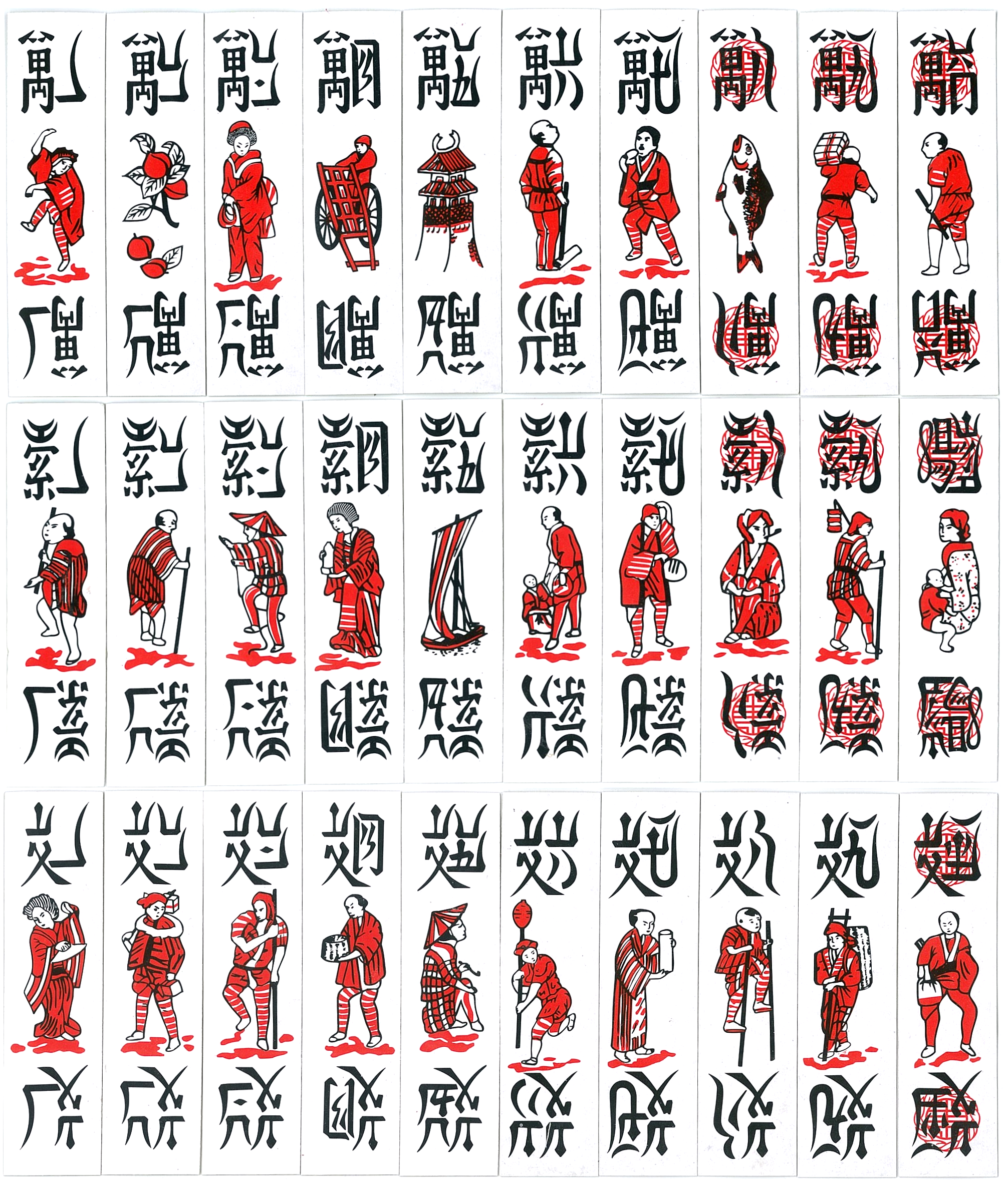
1 (文一), 2 (文二), 3 (文三), 4 (文四), 5 (文五), 6 (文六), 7 (文七), 8 (文八), 9 (文九), Half (文半)

=== Komatsufuda pattern ===
The image below shows a suit of coins from a Komatsufuda deck of 48 cards:

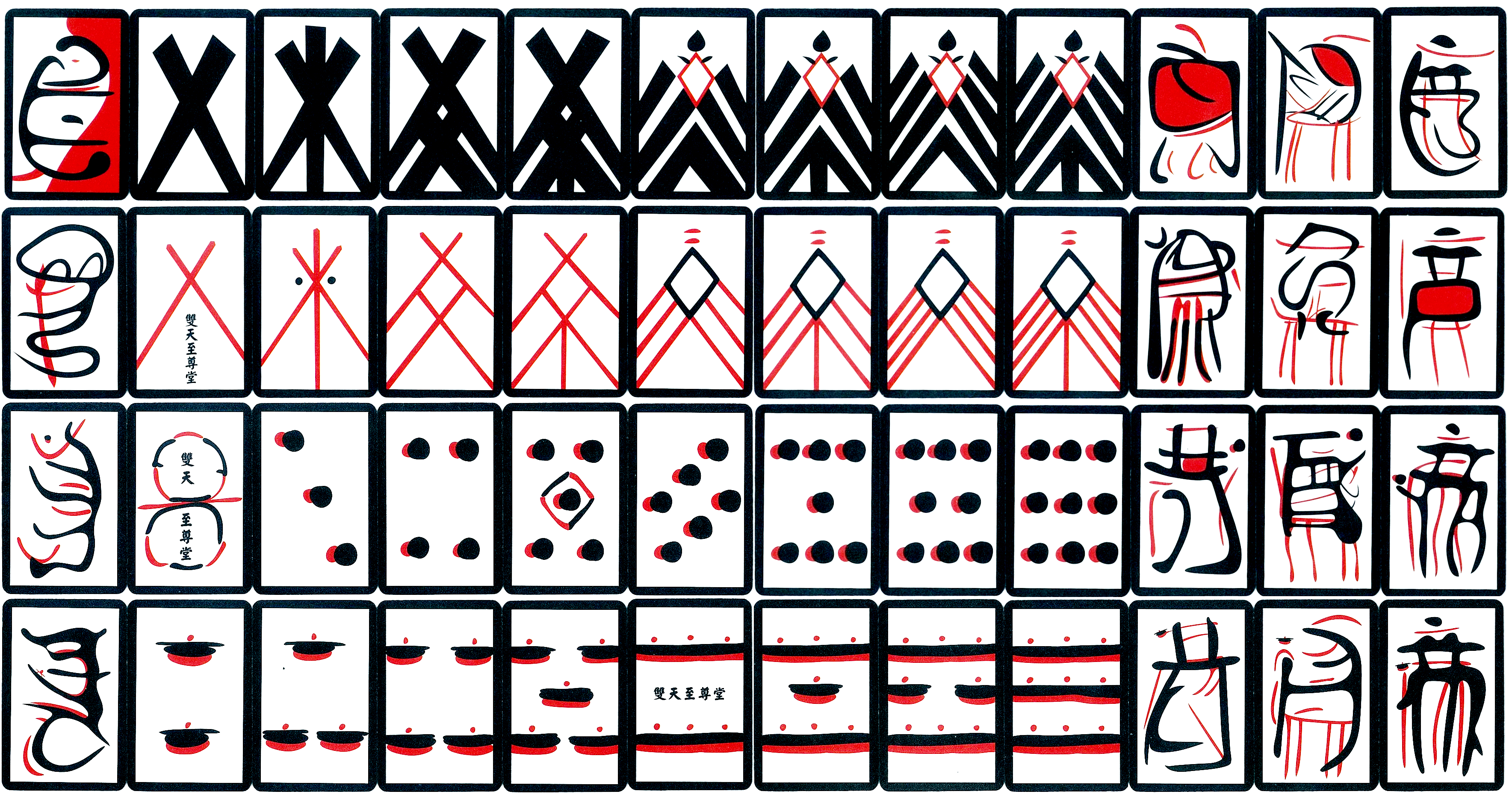
Ace, 2, 3, 4, 5, 6, 7, 8, 9, Knave, Knight, King

=== Unsun karuta pattern ===
The image below shows a suit of coins from an Unsun karuta deck of 75 cards. The Japanese call this suit Japanese: オウル from Portuguese: Ouros meaning "gold" despite not using any gold coloring.

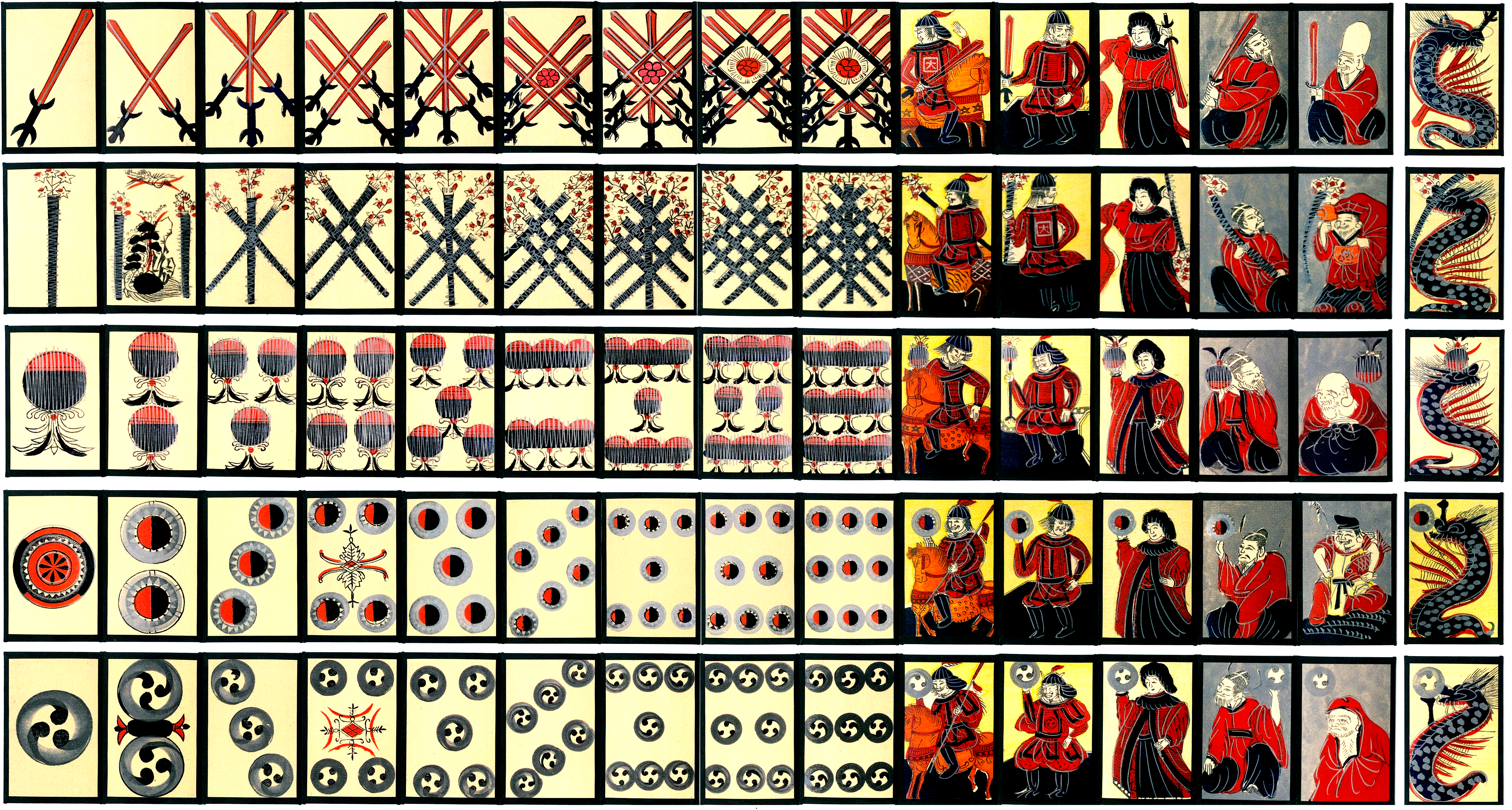
Ace, 2, 3, 4, 5, 6, 7, 8, 9, Knight, King, Female Knave, Sun, Un, Dragon

== Individual cards ==
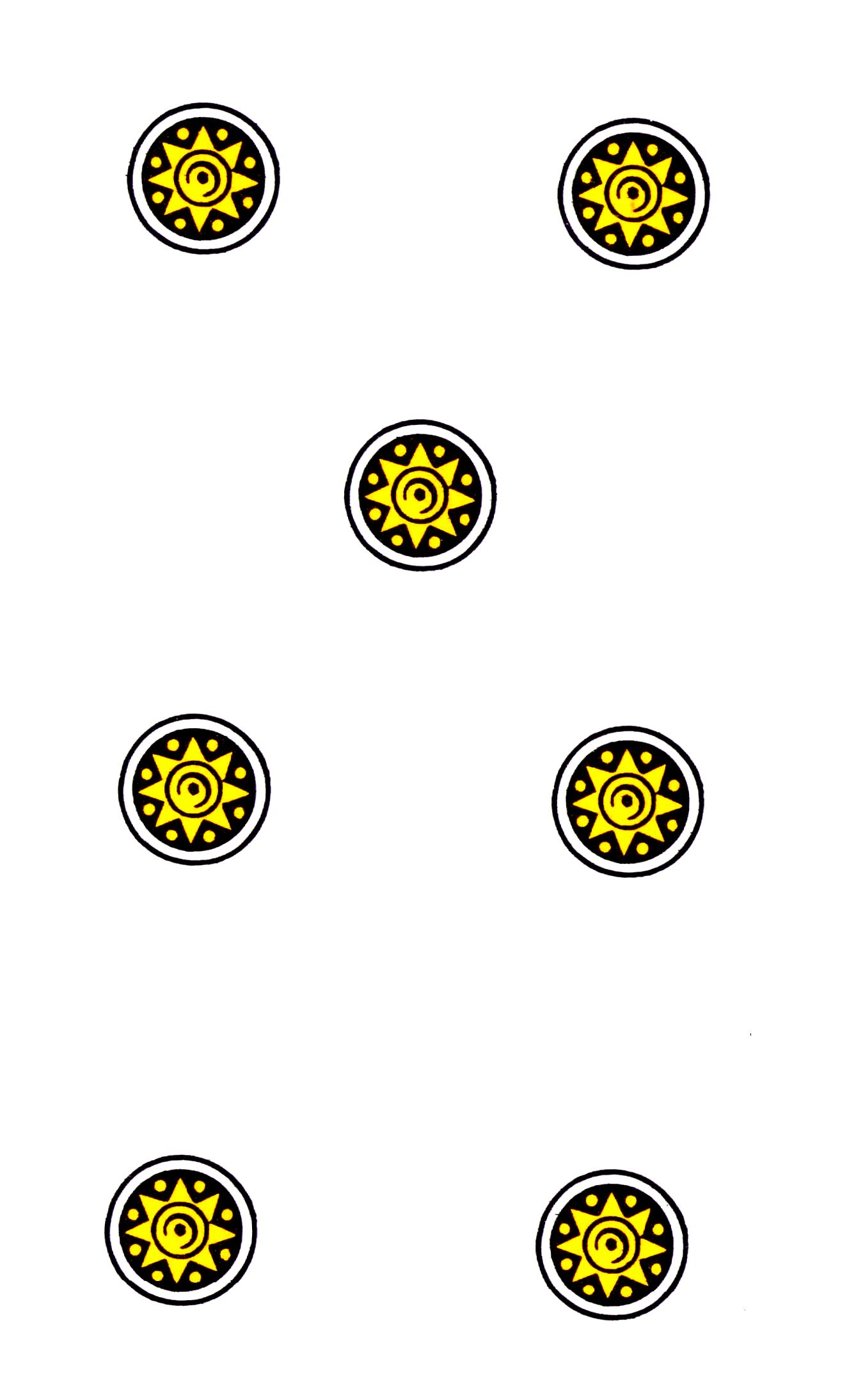
The sette bello in scopa

- Seven of coins. The seven of coins is the most valuable individual card in Italy's national game of scopa. Known as the sette bello ("beautiful seven"), capturing it is one of four achievements that earns a game point. This card inspired the name for the Settebello (train), which in turn inspired the name for Sette Bello, the racehorse. The card also inspired the nickname to Italy men's national water polo team.
- Ace of coins. In some Italian patterns the ace of coins is represented by an eagle. Similar to the ace of spades, it often has a more ornate design due to it being used for the stamp tax.

== See also ==
- Spanish-suited playing cards
- Italian playing cards
- Coins – suit used in divinatory tarot cards

== Literature ==
- Parlett, David (2008). The Penguin book of card games. London: Penguin. ISBN 978-0-14-103787-5. OCLC 229463734.
- Needham, Joseph; Tsien, Tsuen-hsuin (1985), Science and Civilization in China: Volume 5, Chemistry and Chemical Technology, Part 1, Paper and Printing, Cambridge University Press, ISBN 0-521-08690-6
