= Oicho-Kabu =

Japanese card game

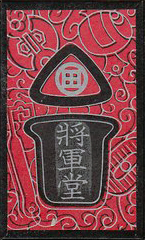
- A kabufuda ace card
- Origin: Japan
- Type: Banking
- Players: 2+
- Skills: Card counting, Probability
- Age range: adult
- Cards: 40
- Deck: Kabufuda
- Rank (high→low): 九 八 七 六 五 四 三 二 一 十
- Play: Counter-Clockwise
- Chance: High

Oicho-Kabu (おいちょかぶ) is a traditional Japanese card game that is similar to baccarat. It is typically played with special kabufuda cards. A hanafuda deck can also be used, if the last two months are discarded, and Western playing cards can be used if the face cards are removed from the deck and aces are counted as one. "Oicho-Kabu" derived from Portuguese "Oito-Cabo" which in English means "Eight-End". As in baccarat, this game also has a dealer, whom the players try to beat.

The goal of the game is to reach 9. As in baccarat, the last digit of any total over 10 is the hand's score: a 15 counts as 5, a 12 as 2, and a 20 as 0.

The worst hands in oicho-kabu have a value of 0. One of these worst hands is an eight, a nine and a three, phonetically expressed as "ya-kyu-san". This is the origin of the Japanese word for "gangster", yakuza.

== Gameplay ==
Before the game starts, the players decide on the domae (胴前), which is the maximum number of points they can bet on. This is the maximum limit for the total bets of all the players. For example, if the domae is 50 points, player A bets 25 points, player B bets 15 points, and player C bets 10 points, then player D is not allowed to bet since the total is now 50 points.

The dealer is determined by having all players flip over a card from the deck. The person closest to 9 will be the dealer. If there is a tie, another card is flipped. The dealer should sit facing the other players.

The dealer shuffles the cards, and a player is given the opportunity to cut. Four cards are placed face-up on the table from right to left of the dealer to form four tableaus. The dealer gives themself one card face-down.

The players can choose any tableau to place a bet on. They may choose to bet on multiple tableaus. A tableau may have multiple bets from different players, so the players should keep track of their individual bets.

The dealer then places one card face-down from right-to-left on each tableau. The players are shown the card before it is placed if they had made a bet on its tableau.

The players now consider their tableaus' point values to determine whether to be dealt one more card face-up. However, this also depends on the value of the tableau:

- if the value is 3 or less, they must draw a card
- if the value is 7 or more, they cannot draw a card. The exception to this is if the tableau's value is 9, in which case, they may request for another card in the hopes for "Arashi" (アラシ).
- otherwise, the decision to draw is given to the player sitting closest (counter-clockwise) to the dealer.

Even if players are dissatisfied with their resulting totals, a fourth card cannot be dealt to the tableau.

A tableau with no player bets will have its face-down card flipped up, and a card will be dealt face-up to it.

After all four tableaus have been decided, the dealer then flips their card face-up and deals a second card face-up to themself. The dealer may decide whether to deal themself a third card. After the decision, all face-down cards are revealed so that a winner for each tableau can be determined.

If the dealer wins, they will collect all points bet on the tableaus that they've won. Likewise, if the player wins, they will collect from the dealer the amount that they bet. If both the dealer and player have the same value, it is a draw, but there is a rule that states the dealer wins. There is also a rule where the dealer wins if the dealer and player end up in value 0.

The dealer is replaced when:

- they have dealt a set predetermined number of times
- they go bankrupt (i.e. lost all their points)
- the domae doubles in value
- the dealer ends up in a value 5 or less

== Yaku ==
A yaku (役) is a specific combination of cards with a predetermined value, similar to the yaku in riichi mahjong.

=== Kuppin (クッピン) ===
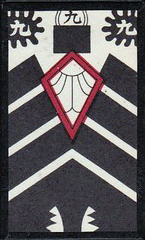
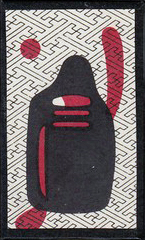
Kuppin Yaku

If the dealer's first two cards are 9 and 1, the dealer wins unconditionally, because the number 9 is related to ku (苦, "suffering"). Some rules say the order does not matter and the combination becomes invalid if a third card is drawn, whereas others say the 9 must be the first card before 1.

=== Shippin (シッピン) ===
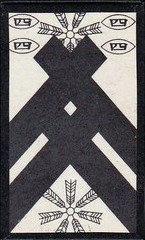
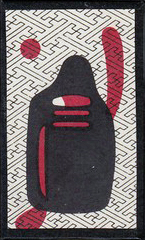
Shippin Yaku

If the player's first two cards are 4 and 1, the player wins unconditionally, because the number 4 is related to shi (死, "death"). Some rules say the order does not matter and the combination becomes invalid if a third card is drawn, whereas others say the 4 must be the first card before 1.

If both kuppin and shippin occur during the same round, then kuppin takes precedence.

=== Arashi (アラシ) ===
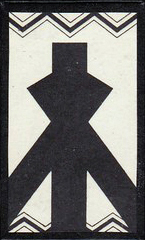
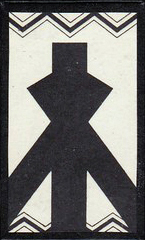
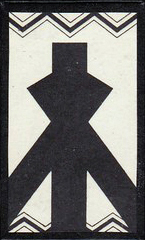
Great Arashi Yaku

If all three cards in a tableau are the same number (i.e. three-of-a-kind), the player wins triple the amount bet. The player wins this even against the dealer's kuppin or shippin. If the dealer gets three-of-a-kind, then the players pay three times the amount bet. In some rules, the arashi privilege is reserved for the players only.

If both the dealer and the players have arashi, then the one with the larger total value wins. That is, the strongest combination is three 3 cards. This combination is called arashi-kabu (アラシカブ), or the "great arashi" (オオアラシ) and can win five times as much instead of three.

== Local yaku ==
The following yaku are only used in some regions and in some games. Players should agree upon which yaku (if any) are valid and their rankings before starting a game.

=== Niichi (ニイチ) ===
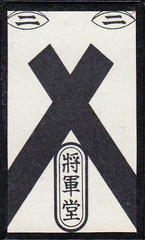
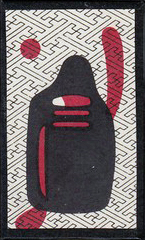
Niichi Yaku

A combination of 2 and 1. If a third card is drawn, it is invalid. This yaku is more advantageous for players as they are able to choose which cards to bet on, so this yaku is rarely used.

=== Shidō (シドウ) ===
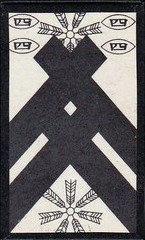
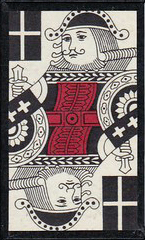
Shidō Yaku

A combination of 4 and 10.

=== Shiro (シロ) ===
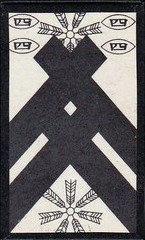
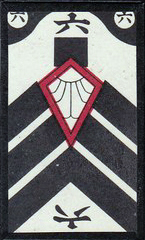
Shiro Yaku

A combination of 4 and 6.

=== Zoro (揃 or ゾロ) ===
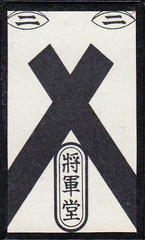
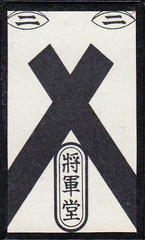
Tsuru Yaku

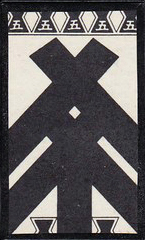
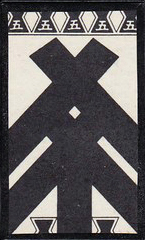
Gogo Yaku

A combination of two of the same cards (i.e. a pair). A pair of 1s is worth 1 zoro, a pair of 9s is worth 9 zoro, and so forth. If both the dealer and the players have a zoro, then the one with the larger zoro value wins. The 9 zoro is the strongest and the 10 zoro is the weakest. Sometimes only two 2s (called tsuru, ツル) and two 5s (called gogo, ゴゴ) are used. This yaku is rarely used because it tends to give the players an advantage.

=== Zoro tsubushi (ゾロつぶし, "zoro crush") ===
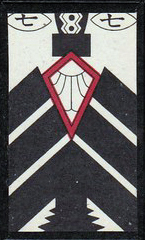
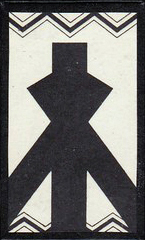
Zoro Tsubushi Yaku

A combination of 7 and 3. This hand is weak, but it can beat zoro without question.

=== Wake-satsu (分け札) ===
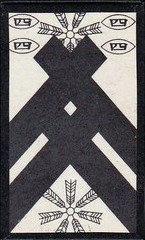
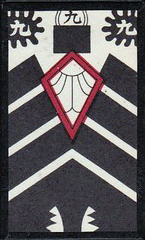
Wake-satsu Yaku

A combination of 4 and 9. This hand is weak in itself, but can be set to win against some hands.

=== Toichi (トイチ) or toppin (トッピン) ===
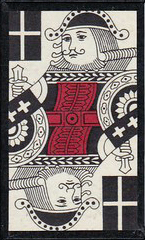
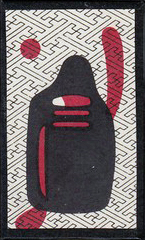
Toichi Yaku

A combination of 1 and 10. There are rules that require the order 10 first before 1 to be valid. This has a low adoption rate among the local yaku.

=== Nobori/kudari (ノボリ・クダリ) ===
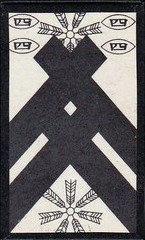
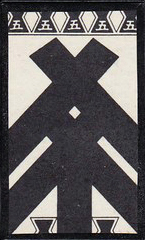
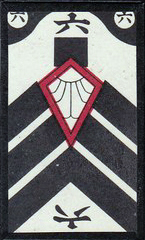
Nobori Yaku

Nobori is when the three cards are consecutive ascending numbers. Kudari is when the three cards are consecutive descending numbers. Sequences do not turn the corner. For example, the combination 9, 10, and 1 is invalid. If both the dealer and players have this yaku, then the one with the larger number in the ones digit of the total value wins. In other words, the combination 2, 3, and 4 (4, 3, and 2 in the case of kudari) is the strongest. This is relatively common among the local yaku.

=== Fūjin ===
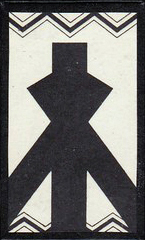
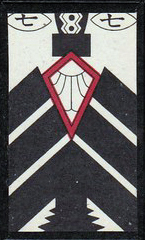
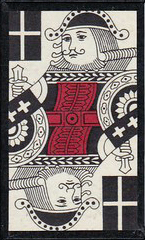
Fūjin Yaku

A combination of 3, 7, and 10. The order does not matter. It was used in hangame.

=== Raijin ===
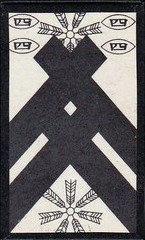
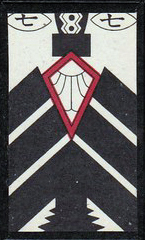
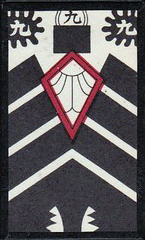
Raijin Yaku

A combination of 4, 7, and 9. The order does not matter. It was used in hangame.

=== Ichi-ni-san (一二三) ===
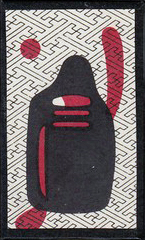
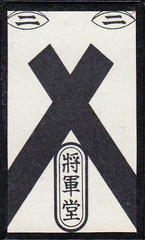
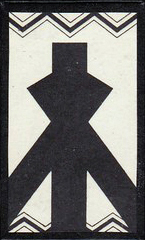
Ichi-Ni-San Yaku

Literally 1-2-3, the same as its combination of 1, 2, and 3. The order does not matter.

=== Shichi-go-san (七五三) ===
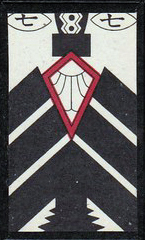
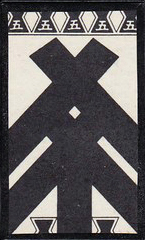
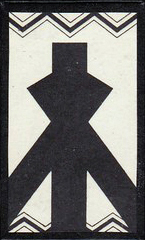
Shichi-Go-San Yaku

Literally 7-5-3, the same as its combination of 7, 5, and 3. The order does not matter.

=== San-hachi hikari (38光, "Three-Eight Light") ===
San-Hachi Hikari Yaku

This yaku is only valid when using hanafuda cards. A combination of the third (March) and eighth (August) months' light cards. Better than any other hand.

=== Doshippin (ドシッピン) ===
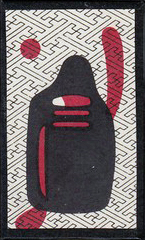
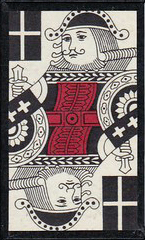
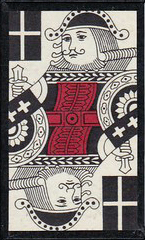
Doshippin Yaku

A combination of 1, 10, and 10. The order does not matter. This is used in the Yakuza mini-game version of oicho-kabu.

=== Pin-basami (ピンばさみ, "Pin scissors") ===
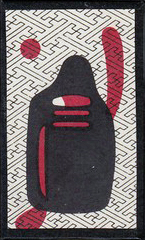
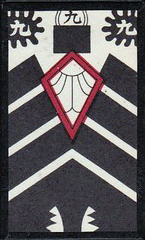
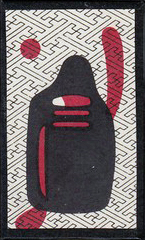
Pin-basami Yaku

The yaku is applicable for players only. If the face-down middle card in the tableau is sandwiched between two 1s, the players declare pin scissors, and the dealer unconditionally gives them the number sandwiched between the pins times the number of points bet (i.e. the dealer unconditionally loses).

== Osaka (Kansai) local rules ==
In the Kansai region, centered around Osaka, unique local rules may be adopted.

=== Major changes ===
Regardless of the total number of the second card, the players can request a third card. Therefore, the player may attempt to get an arashi for numbers 4 and 9.

Shippin only applies to the players, not the dealer (for whom the value stays as 5). The ranking of the yaku (from strongest to weakest) is thus:

1. Arashi – triple points
2. Dealer's kuppin – double points
3. Players' kuppin – double points
4. Regular hands

In theory, the players should bet on tableaus with a value of 1 or 4.

When both dealer and players have arashi, one of the following is used (major change from top to bottom):

1. Dealer wins
2. The strongest cards rank from: 3>2>1>10>9>8>7>6>5>4
3. The numbers are strongest in the order of 4=9>3=8>2=7>1=6>5=10, and if they are equal, the dealer wins. This order is based on the strength of the second card. For example, if the cards were two 4's or two 9's, then the value would be 8 (which it would then be surprising to draw for a third card).
4. Tie; the original bet is returned to the player.
5. The player wins. In this case, if the player declares the win at the time the arashi is established, the payout will be made immediately. Also, the dealer cannot escape from the player's arashi (even if the value is zero for three 10s).
6. The higher the number, the stronger it is.

When the player has a 4 and a 6, they can choose to drop out instead of choosing to draw the third card. This is called shiroku no nige (シロクの逃げ, "4-6's escape").

=== Minor changes ===
A dealer's kuppin is an unconditional win for the dealer.

If the player plays three 10s, the game with the dealer will be an unconditional draw. If the dealer plays three 10s, the game itself will be invalid. If the player plays two 10s, it is a value of 0.

If the dealer is dissatisfied with the cards they were dealt, they can unconditionally redeal the cards for everyone. This is called minso (ミンソ). This must be announced before the players makes their bets. This rule is found not only in the Kansai region but also in the Chugoku and Shikoku regions. This rule is quite disadvantageous to the players, so it has almost disappeared. It is very rare to see people born before the war playing, so it can be said that it is a rule that is disappearing with the times.

There is also a rule that if three or more cards on the table are the same number, the dealer must re-deal the cards.

== See also ==
- Hanafuda
- Baccarat
- Blackjack
