= Portuguese-suited playing cards =

Playing card style named after Portugal

Later Portuguese pattern (19th century)

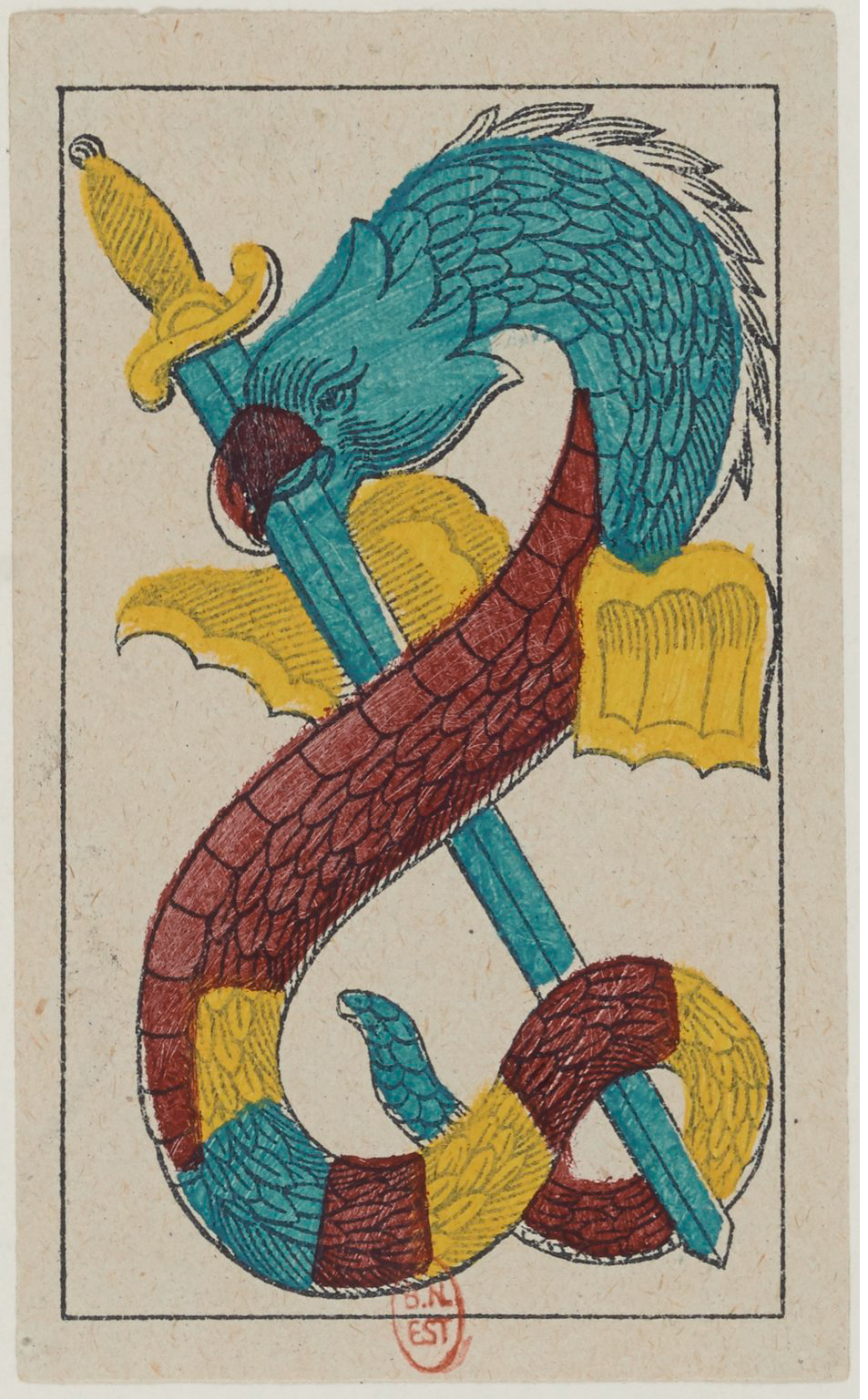
Ace of swords

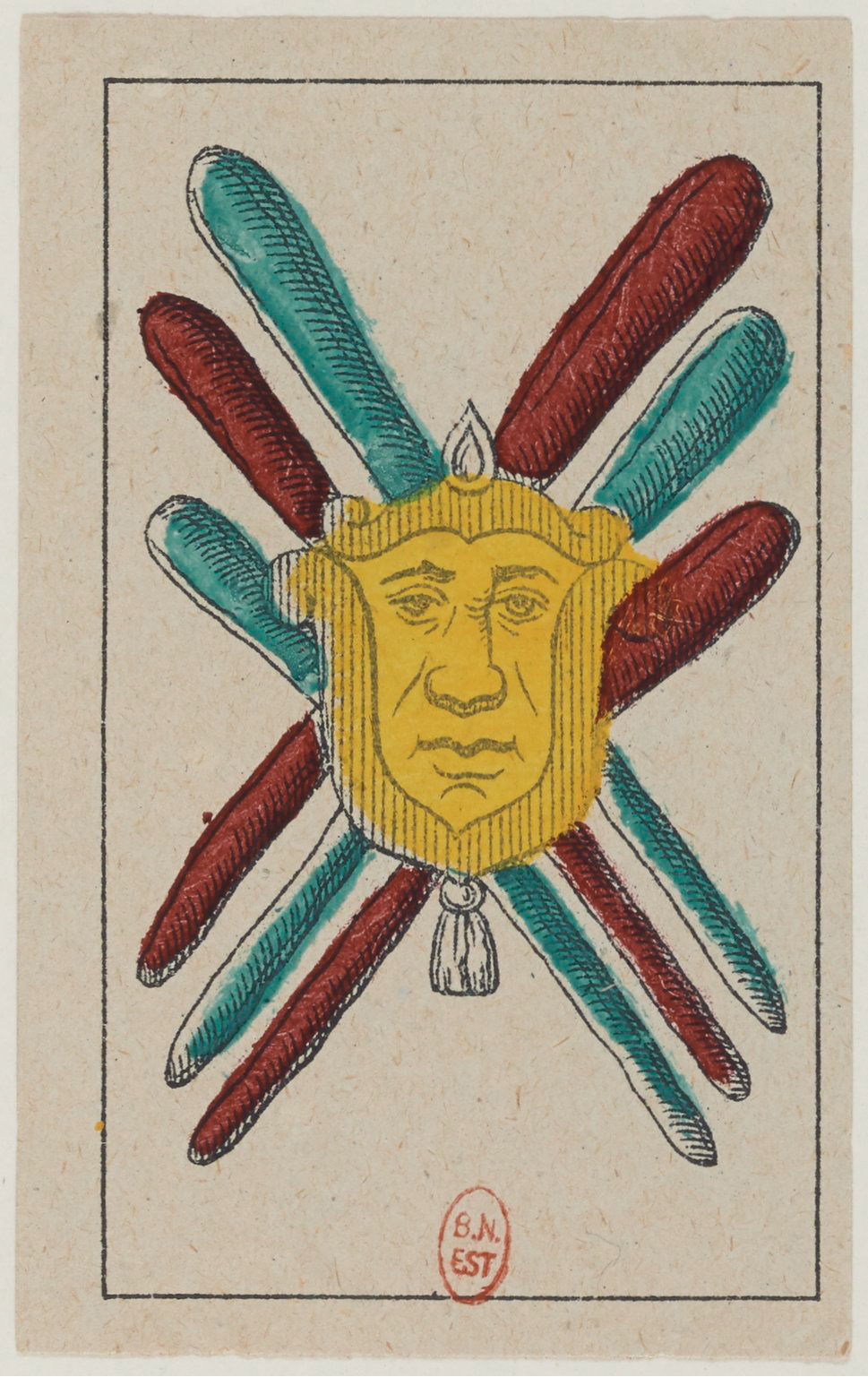
6 of clubs

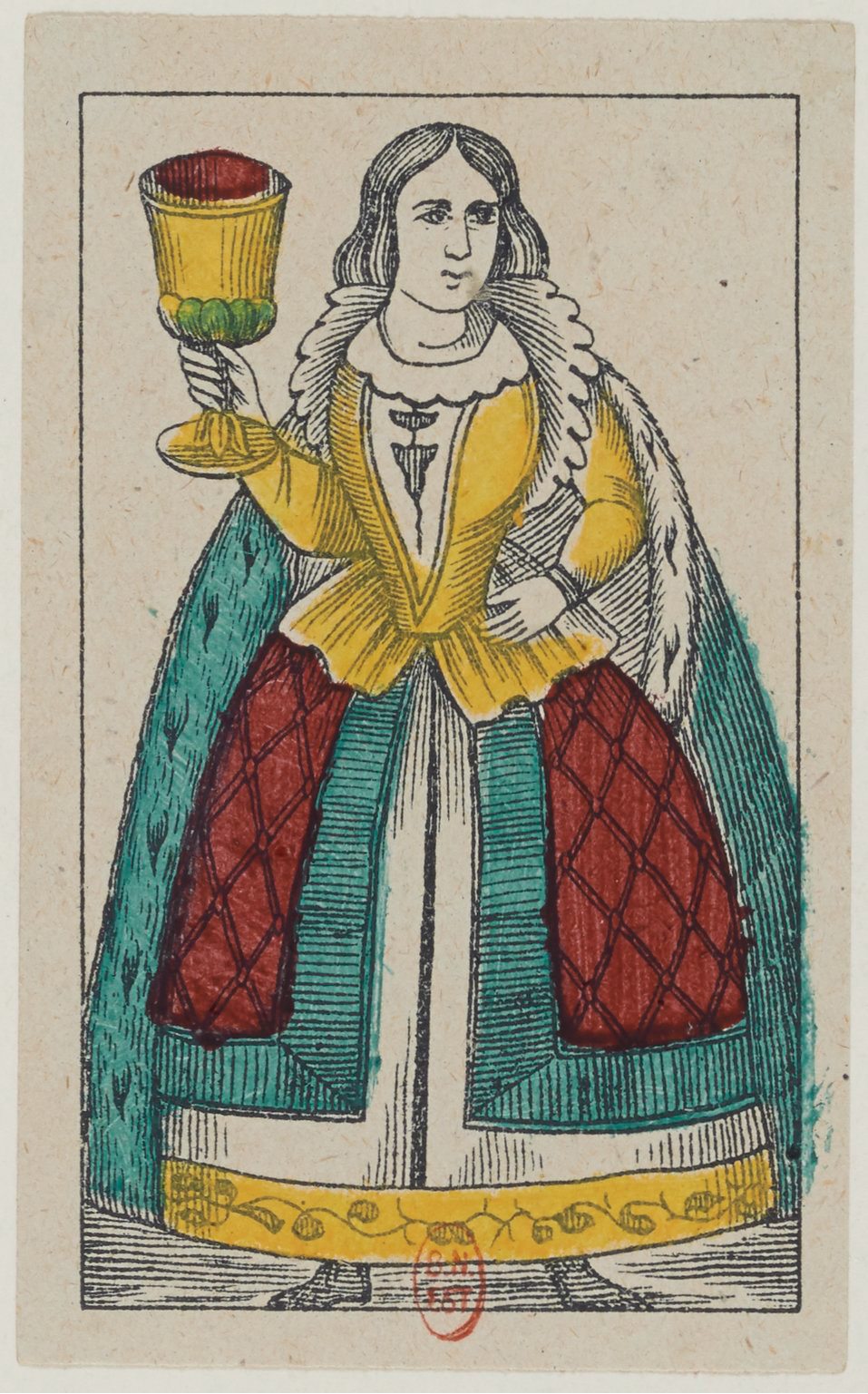
Sota of cups

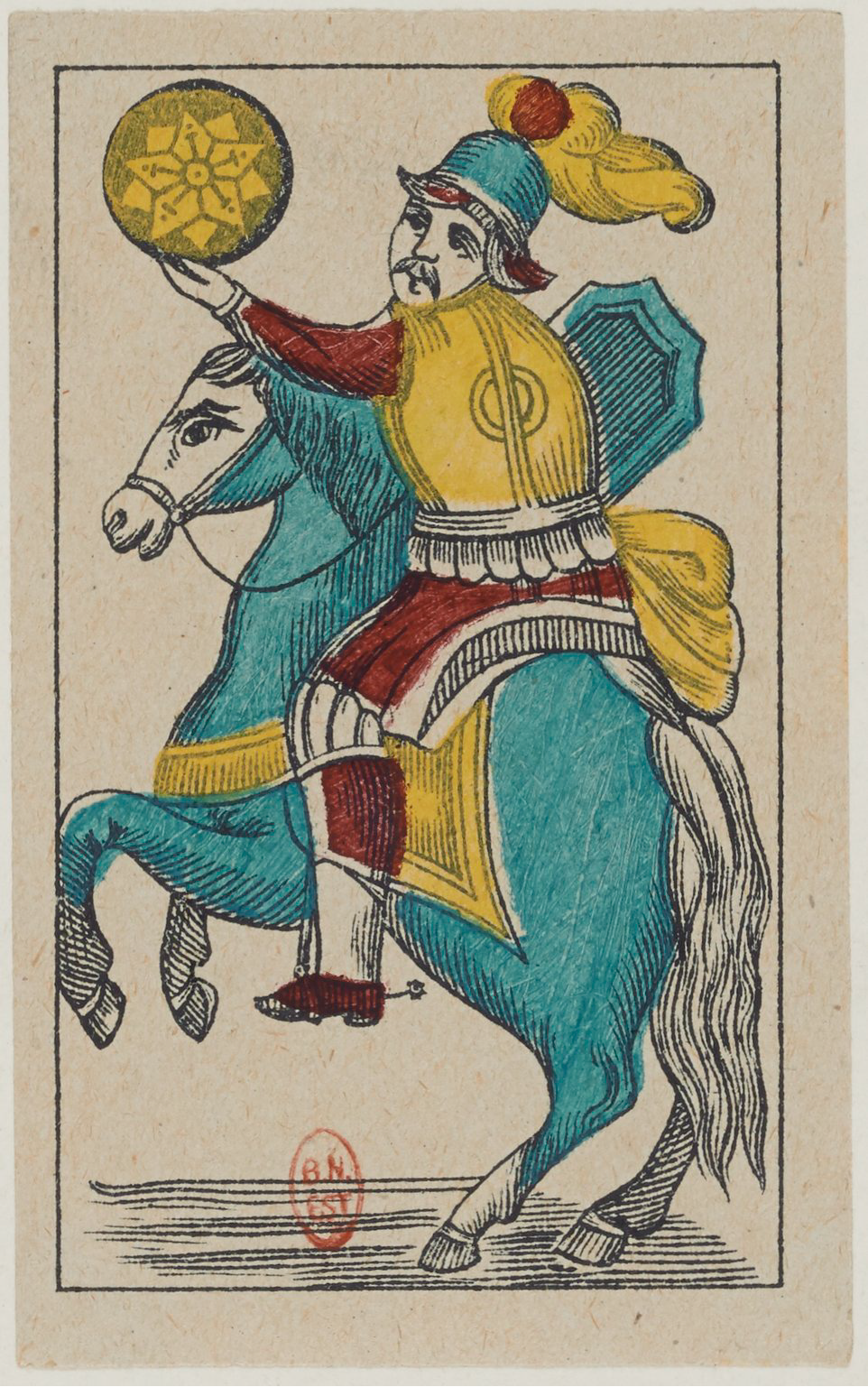
Knight of coins

Portuguese-suited playing cards or Portuguese-suited cards are a nearly extinct suit-system of playing cards that survive in a few towns in Sicily and Japan. Although not of Portuguese origin, they were named after the country because Portugal was the last European nation to use them on a large basis. They are very similar to Spanish-suited playing cards in that they use the Latin-suit system of cups, swords, coins and clubs. However, this system featured straight swords and knobbly clubs like the Spanish suits but intersected them like the northern Italian suits. The Aces featured dragons and the knaves were all distinctly female. The arrangement of the cups and coins are also slightly different:

- Rank 6 has two horizontal rows of three pips. (which became diagonal rows to fit on smaller cards in Japan)
- Rank 7 has the same arrangement as the previous with an additional pip in the middle.
- Rank 8 has the same arrangement as the next without the pip in the middle.
- Rank 9 has the pips arranged in a 3-by-3 square.

Portuguese suit signs
Suit				
(United Kingdom)	Swords	Cups	Coins	Clubs
(Portugal)	Espadas	Copas	Ouros	Paus
(Spain)	Espadas	Copas	Oros	Bastos

== History ==
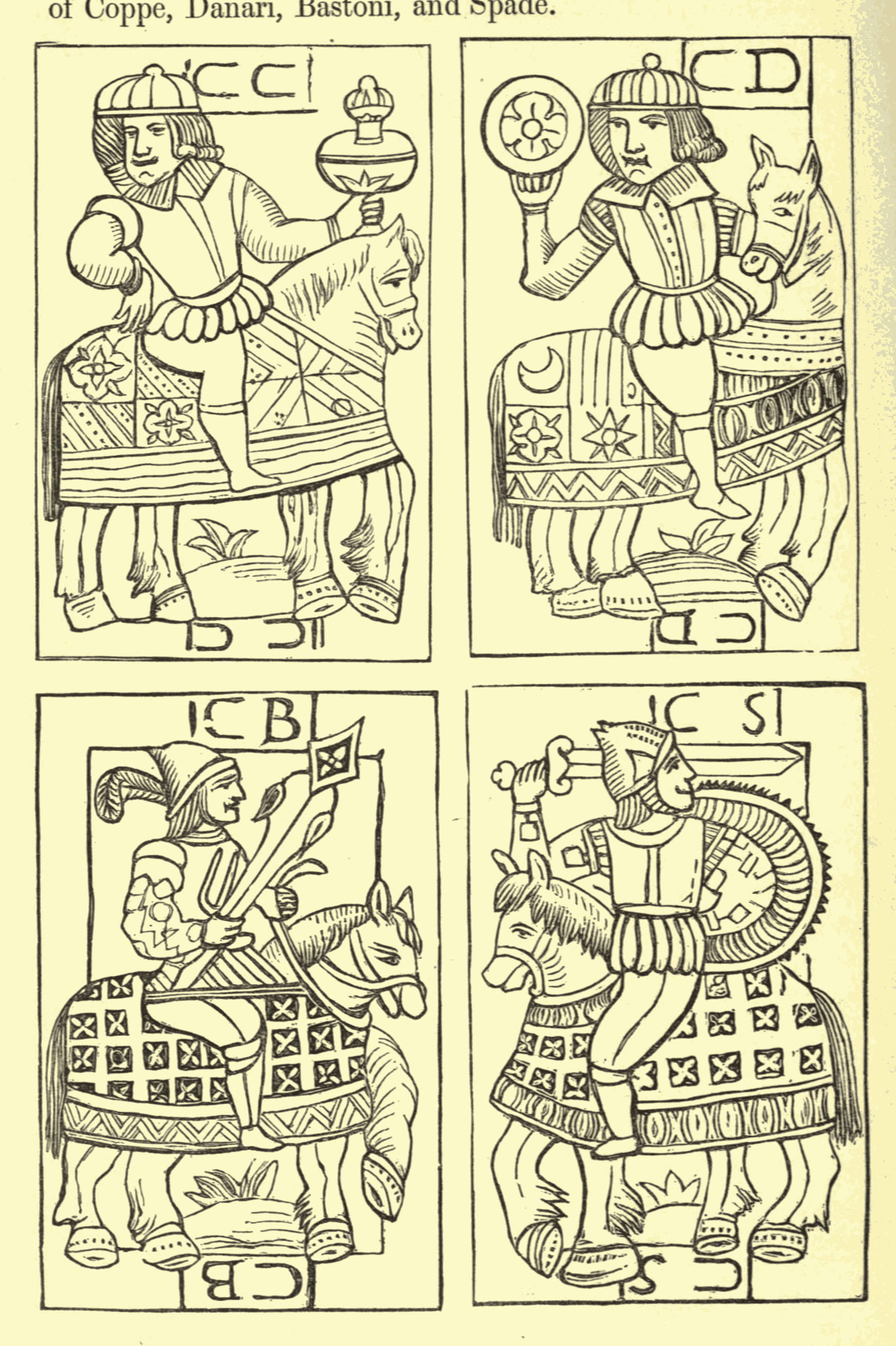
Knights (Intermediate Portuguese pattern, 1693)

This system was believed to have originated in Spain as an export pattern. The Spanish spread it to Portugal, southern Italy, Malta, the Spanish Netherlands, and as far as Peru but was probably never popular in its homeland. Instead of using la pinta, these decks used abbreviations as indices at the top and sometimes also the bottom of the card. A difference between the Portuguese and "Italo-Portuguese" patterns was that the Portuguese decks lacked rank 10 pip cards like the Spanish patterns, while "Italo-Portuguese" decks have them.

In 1769, the Real Fábrica de Cartas de Jogar was set up in Lisbon to manufacture cards. They made several graphical changes such as getting rid of indices and making the kings stand like their Spanish counterparts. Prior to this, the kings were seated. When domestic production shut down around 1870, manufacture shifted abroad, mostly to Belgium and Germany where makers introduced further changes.

They were used in Portugal until the late 19th and early 20th centuries when these cards were slowly abandoned in favour of the French deck starting around 1800. Popular games like Arrenegada (Portuguese name for Ombre), Bisca (Portuguese name for briscola) and Sueca, which were played with Latin-suited cards, had to be adapted to the new French-suited cards. Thus:

- the old suit names were attributed to the new suits. In Portuguese, the Hearts suit is called Copas ("cups"), the Spades suit is called Espadas ("swords"), the Diamonds suit is called Ouros ("gold coins"), and the Clubs suit is called Paus ("clubs" or "sticks").
- the new face cards (King, Queen, Jack) had also to match the old ones (King, Knight, Knave). The King match was an obvious one, but the Queen was held for the lower court card because the old Portuguese sotas were female, and so it was matched with the Knave. The Jack was thought to be the Knight (Cavalier). Thus, in traditional Portuguese games, the cards usually rank King-Jack-Queen.

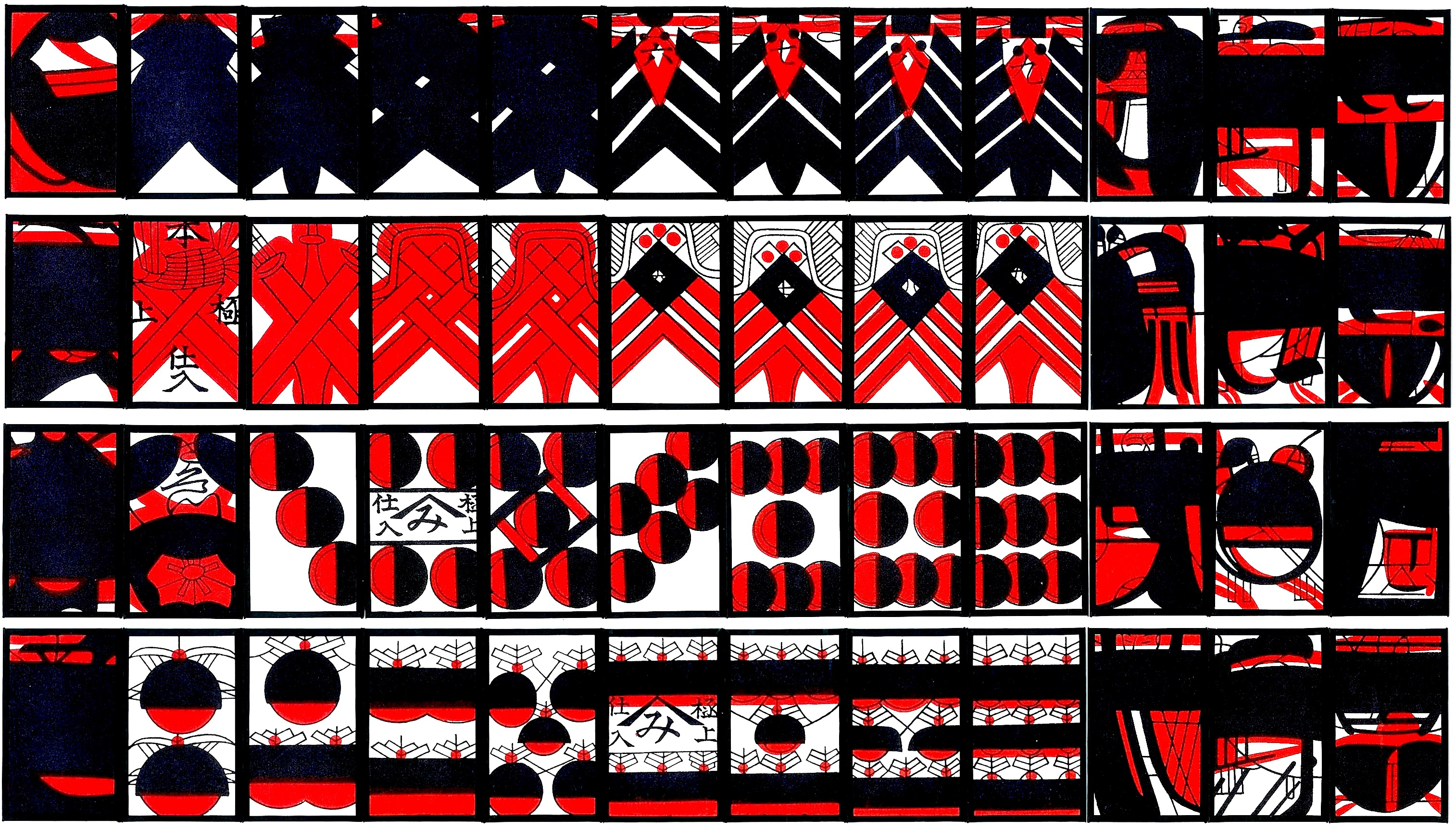
Sakuragawa-fuda, a mekuri karuta pattern

Both conventions mentioned above are also practiced in Malta which once used Portuguese-suited decks. The Portuguese spread their cards to Brazil, and Java where they were also abandoned in favor of the French deck. Portuguese decks also started the development of karuta in Japan (karuta comes from Portuguese "carta") though most decks bear little resemblance to their ancestor. The closest living relative of the Portuguese deck is the Sicilian Tarot which has these features minus the Aces. The extinct Minchiate deck also shared some features.

== Current standard patterns ==
=== Tarocco Siciliano ===
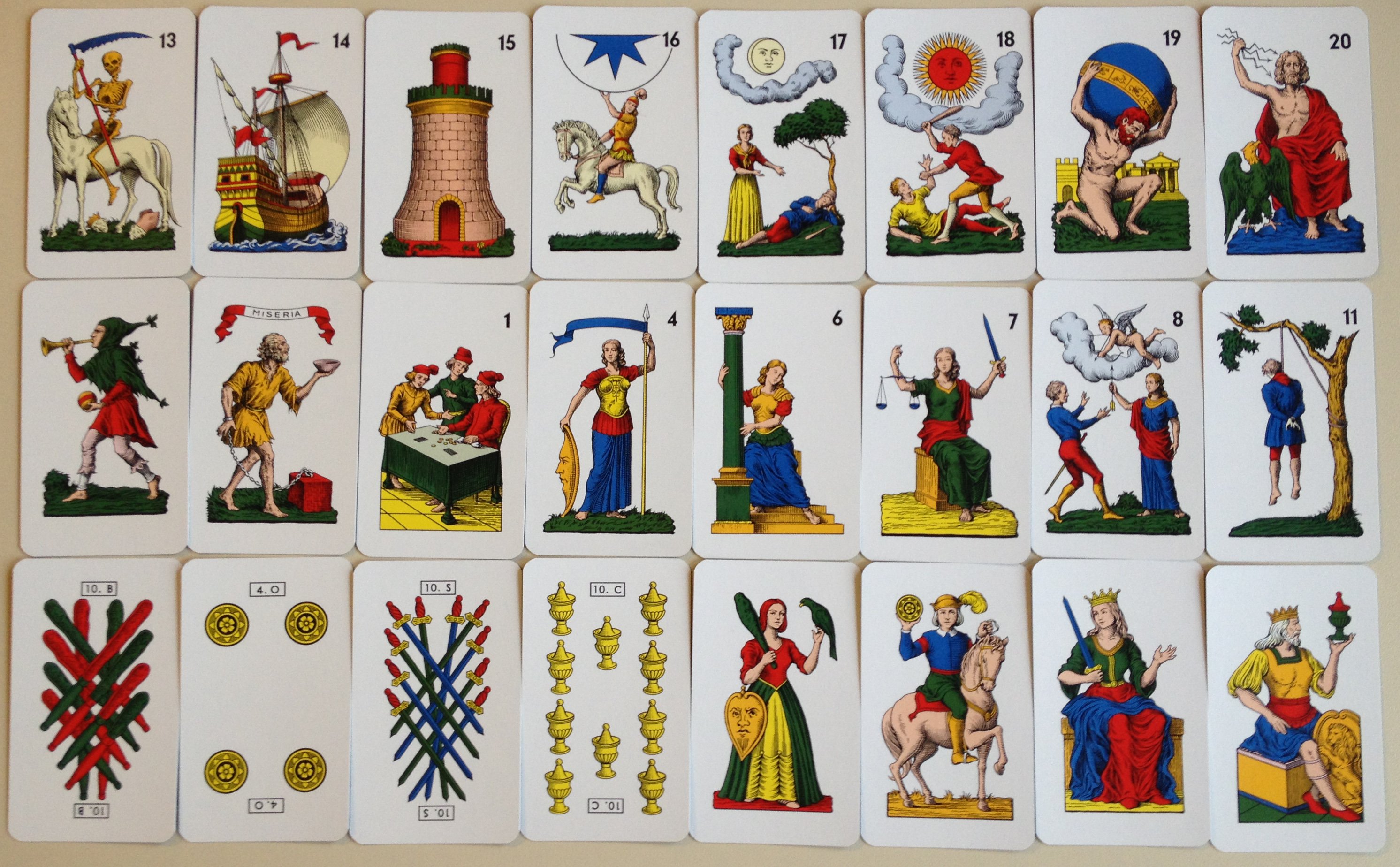
Tarocco Siciliano cards

The Tarocco Siciliano is the only surviving Portuguese-suited deck in Europe. It is a 64-card tarot deck used in Barcellona Pozzo di Gotto, Tortorici, and Mineo. Until the mid-20th century, it was also used in Calatafimi-Segesta until players switched over to the Tarocco Piemontese. In this pattern, kings are still seated. It is a stripped deck that removed all pip cards under five except in the suit of coins which retained the ace and the four. The ace of coins lacks the dragon but it is a card that was removed and then reintroduced for the purpose of displaying the stamp duty. Originally, it had 78 cards but the popularity of three-handed games led to the shortening of the deck. All the pip cards have indices center top and bottom but the trumps have them only on the right corner.

=== Komatsufuda ===
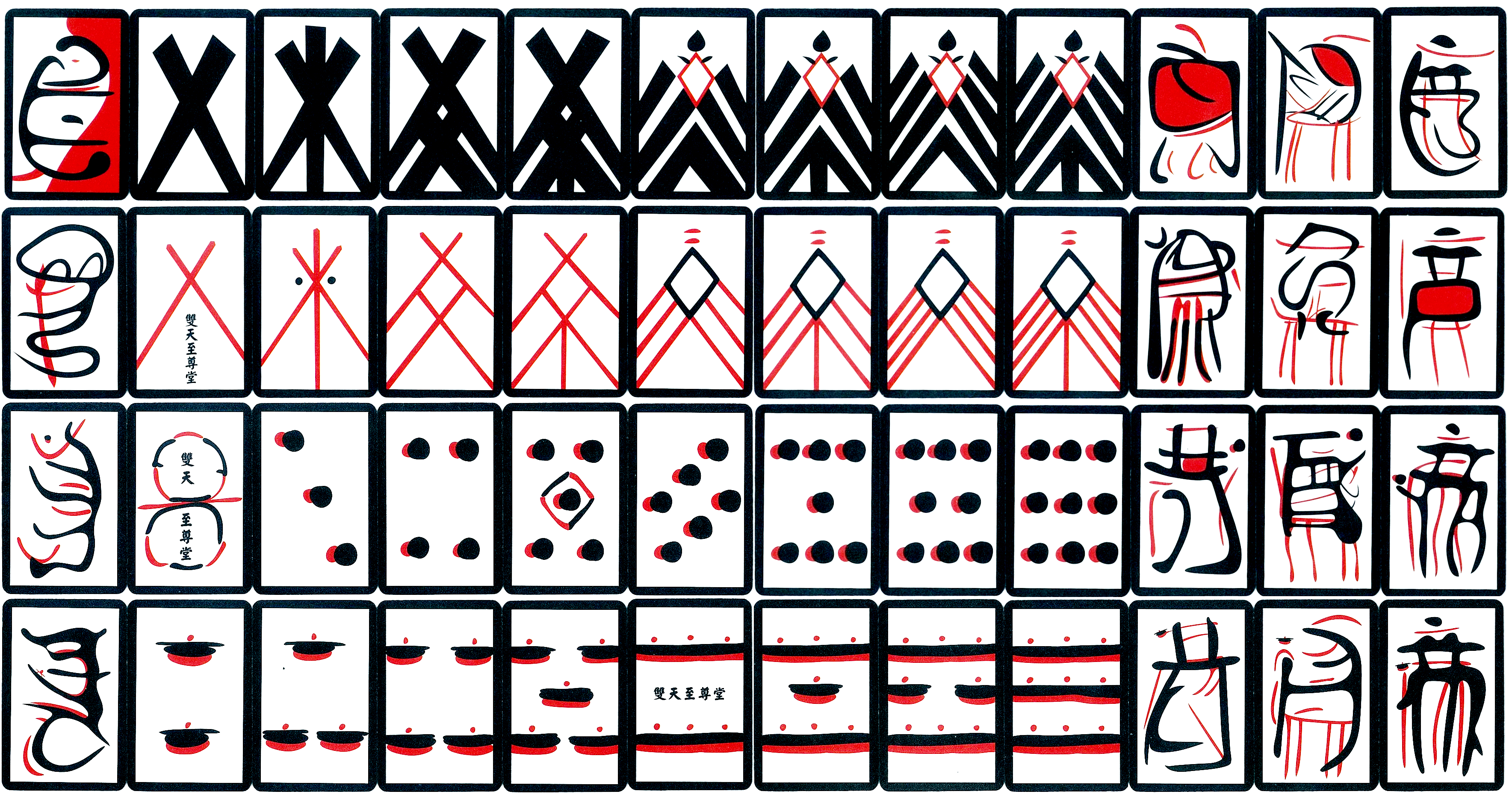
Komatsufuda

Komatsufuda (Japanese: 小松札) is a descendant of Tenshō karuta, the first indigenous Japanese deck, named after the Tenshō period (1573–92). When the Tokugawa shogunate banned these cards, manufacturers began to disguise their cards with abstract designs, especially on the court cards and dragon aces. During the 17th century, they were known as yomi karuta, after a popular Poch-like game. In the 18th century, they became known as mekuri karuta, after a popular fishing card game. Komatsufuda, however, is still used to play Kakkuri, a descendant of yomi, found in Yafune, Fukui prefecture.

=== Unsun Karuta ===
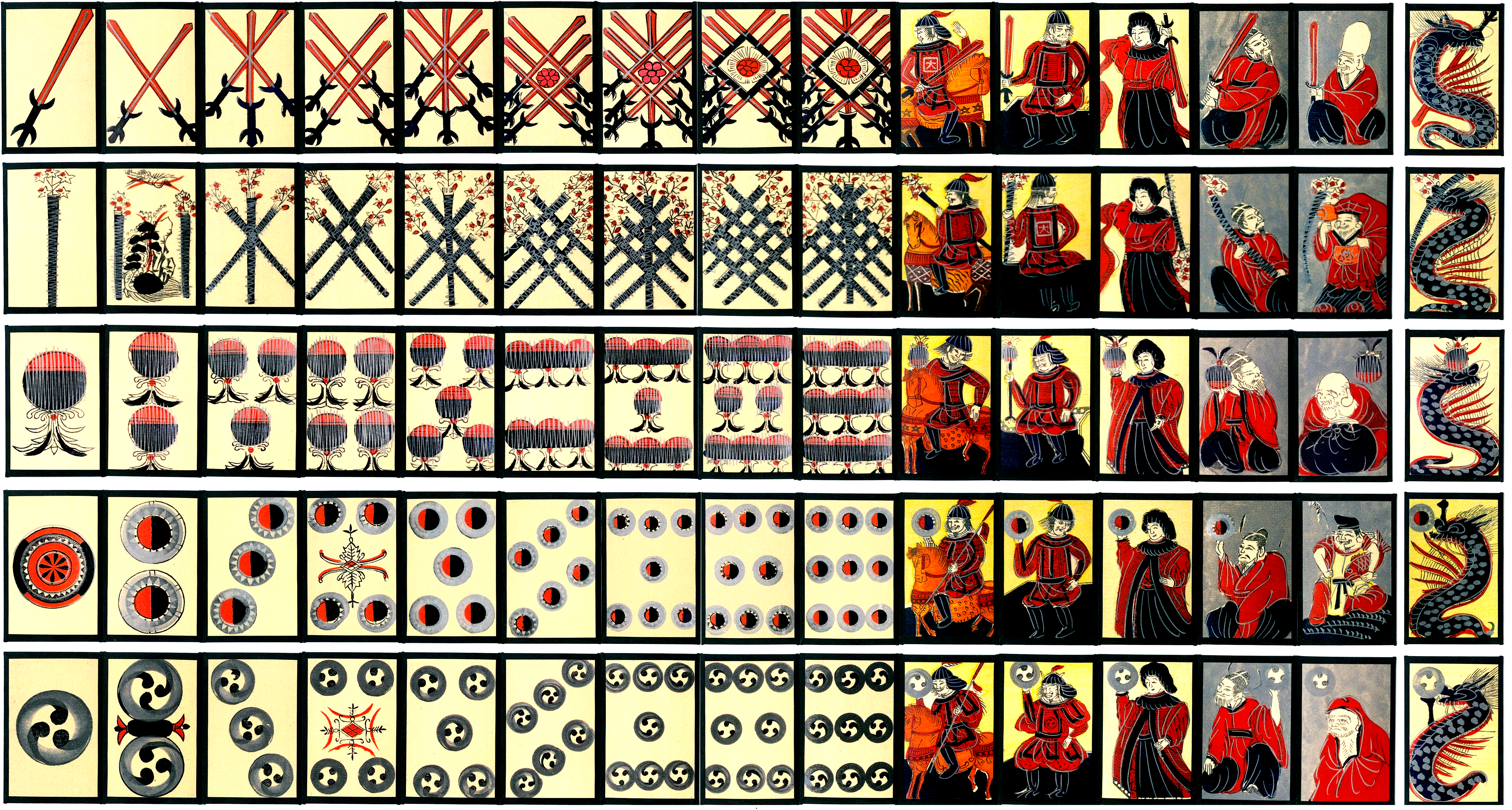
Unsun karuta

Unsun karuta (Japanese: うんすんカルタ) is a 75-card deck with five suits of 15 ranks. The aces and dragons have become separate cards and new ranks were added for the face cards. The new Guru suit used circular whirls (mitsudomoe) as pips. Unsun karuta is still used in Hitoyoshi, Kumamoto, to play hachinin-meri, a trick-taking game descended from Guritipau, a relative of Ombre. Unlike mekuri karuta, this deck survived since the late 17th century without the need for abstract designs due to the remoteness of Hitoyoshi. The game and deck was nearly extinct until the few remaining players started a revival campaign during the 1970s. The town has declared the game to be an intangible cultural heritage.
