= Tressette =

Card game

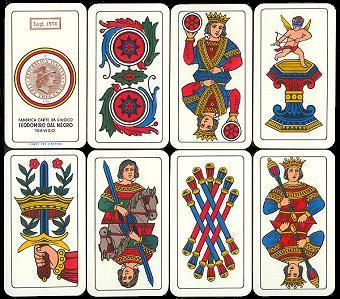
- Italian playing cards from a deck of "Bergamasche" by Dal Negro
- Origin: Italy
- Alternative names: Terziglio, Trešeta
- Type: Trick taking
- Family: Tresette group
- Players: 2–4
- Skills: Tactics
- Cards: 40 cards
- Deck: Italian
- Rank (high→low): 3 2 A R C F 7 6 5 4
- Play: Anticlockwise
- Playing time: 25 min
- Chance: Medium

Related games
- Calabresella, Pollack, Marafon, Trischettn

Tressette or Tresette is a 40-card, trick-taking card game. It is one of Italy's major national card games, together with Scopa and Briscola. It is also popular in the regions that were once controlled by the Italian predecessor states, such as Albania, Montenegro, coastal Slovenia (Slovene Littoral) and coastal Croatia (Istria and Dalmatia). It is also played in the Canton of Ticino with a French-suited deck. The Austrian game Trischettn as historically played in South Tyrol is also a derivative, albeit played with a 32-card German-suited deck.

It is recorded only from the early 18th century, though greater antiquity is suggested by its lack of trump. The name of the game, literally "three seven," may refer to seven sets of three or four point possibilities when a minimum of three each (three, two, ace or all of those together in a matching suit) are dealt, or to the fact that it is played up to twenty-one. According to Cäsar (1800), the name is derived from "Tre Sett" (three sevens) because, at that time, a player holding three sevens could declare them immediately and win the game (Partie). There are many variants depending on the region of Italy where the game is played.

== Overview ==
Tressette is played with a standard Italian 40-card deck and the cards are ranked as follows from highest to lowest: 3-2-Ace-King-Knight-Knave and then all the remaining cards in numerical order from 7 down to 4. The game may be played with four players playing in two partnerships, or in heads-up play. In either case, ten cards are dealt to each player. In one-on-one play, the remaining twenty cards are placed face down in front of both players. The object of the game is to score as many points as possible until a score of 21 is achieved. Players must follow suit unless that suit does not remain in their hand, and players must show the card they pick up off the card pile to their opponent.

== Scoring ==
Points are scored by collecting the face cards (King, Knight, Knave), threes, and twos; each of these cards scores one third of a point. An ace scores one point on its own. Each player can only score an integer number of points; the thirds of point "in excess" go to the player who scored the last trick. There are 10 2/3 points in a deck; with the point for the last trick that makes a total of 11 2/3 points available. The match continues until a score of 21 is achieved.

== Strategy ==
=== Basic strategy ===
Basic strategy in tressette revolves around gathering as many Aces as possible because they are worth three times the value of any one face card. As such, players typically attempt to "strip" their opponent of the Three and Two in the suit in which they themselves hold an Ace; at that time, the ace may be played safely and a point scored in their favour. Hence, when holding several lower ranked cards in a suit plus the ace you may play the lower ranked cards in the hope your opponent is forced to play the three or two of the suit allowing you to play the ace. Obviously, holding Ace, Three and Two of a suit (called a "Napolitana", "Napoletana" or a "Napoli") is a particularly powerful holding as it allows you to play the Ace with impunity, careful not to surrender it to an off-suit card. As picking up the last hand garners a point, players try to organize their card play for this purpose near the end of a round.

=== Partner interaction ===
When playing in partnerships, any verbal communication between partners regarding the game is considered cheating, unlike in briscola (oral tradition has it that "tressette was invented by four mutes, briscola was invented by four liars"). There are, however, three conventional signs that can be exchanged between partners:

Busso ("Knocking"): The player knocks or raps on the table. This sign can be used only by the first player of the trick. It instructs that player's partner to play the highest-ranked card of the suit being played, in an attempt to win the trick. If the partner does win the trick, that partner is supposed to play any card of the same suit. This strategy allows a player who has a strong card in a suit (i.e. a 2 or 3) to check whether their partner has the other one, without risking to play both cards on the same trick (thus squandering one high-rank card) and keeping the flow of the game under their control.

Volo ("Flying"): The player lets the card drop or "fly down" from a few centimeters above the table. This sign signifies that the player has just played their last card of this particular suit.

Striscio or Liscio ("Sliding"): The player slides the card across the table before playing it. This sign signifies that the player has many cards of that suit (where the exact implications of "many" depend on the context, e.g. the number of cards of that suit still in play or the number of cards each player still has). In some regional variants the use of this sign is deprecated and considered as illegitimate as speaking openly.

== Variations ==
=== Napolitana ===
Also called Tresette con l'accuso (meaning: Tressette with accuso), it is one variation scored up to 31, which uses bonuses during game play. When you gather three aces, three twos, three threes or any Napolitana (a same suit grouping of an ace, three and two) and decide to play one of the group of cards, you declare that you have such a grouping (called a buon gioco, meaning: good play) in your hand and score three points. A group of four (four threes, twos, aces) scores four points. As well, the bonus may be repeated if having played one of the grouping, you happen to pick up a card that makes the grouping in your hand yet again. To keep track of all this, players traditionally turn one card in their collected cards face up, as it is done in scopa.

=== Ciapanò ===
Ciapanò (meaning "don't collect", or more literally "take not", in several northern Italian dialects), also known as traversone in Central Italy and as ko manje or chi fa meno (literally "who makes the fewest [points]") in Croatia and Montenegro, is a variation where the goal is to score the fewest points. The game ends when a player has 21 or more points, and the player with the fewest points wins. It is possible to do "cappotto", i.e. collecting all the 11 points, in which case the player scores 0 points and everybody else scores 11.

Ciapanò can be played by more than two players: if the players are 4 or 5 each one plays on their own, and they receive 10 or 8 cards respectively. If the players are 2, the normal rules apply. If the players are 3, two players receive 13 cards and the one at the right of the dealer is dealt one more card. Before starting to play, the player chooses one of their cards and passes it to the player at their right, who takes it and then passes one of their cards to the last player. The last player puts then one of their cards aside, to be taken by the player who wins the last trick.

One of the regional variants to Ciapanò involves a special score for one of the cards (usually the ace of clubs) of eleven points, that is more than all the other scoring cards combined. The game ends when a player reaches 101 points, and the other rules are unchanged.

=== Trešeta ===
Trešeta is a variant very popular on Croatian Adriatic coast, particularly in Dalmatia, as well as on the Coast of Montenegro, particularly in the Bay of Kotor. It is played using the standard Italian 40-card deck. It can be played one-on-one but most commonly it is played by two pairs of players where partners are seated opposite of each other.

The main difference from the Italian version is that it is usually played until a player or two partnered players reach 41 points, opposed to the 21 points usually required in Tressette. Also, the player that scores the last trick is rewarded with a full point and not 1/3 of a point. Otherwise, point value of card are identical to Italian version. The cards that score 1/3 point (Kings, Horses, Knights, Threes and Twos) are most commonly referred to as bele. Having three threes, twos or aces, or three highest ranked cards (Ace, Two, Three) of the same suit in hand is known as akuža. When a player gets an akuža, three points (or four if they have all four threes, twos or aces) are immediately added to their total score. However, akuža must be announced before the player has played their first card.

The Croatian variant is played in a clockwise order, while in Montenegro the counter-clockwise order is used.

== See also ==
- Briscola
- Piquet
- Trappola
- Trischettn
- Truc

== Literature ==
- Cäsar, Julius (1800). Neuester Spielalmanach. Berlin.
