= Trischettn =

Old card game from South Tyrol

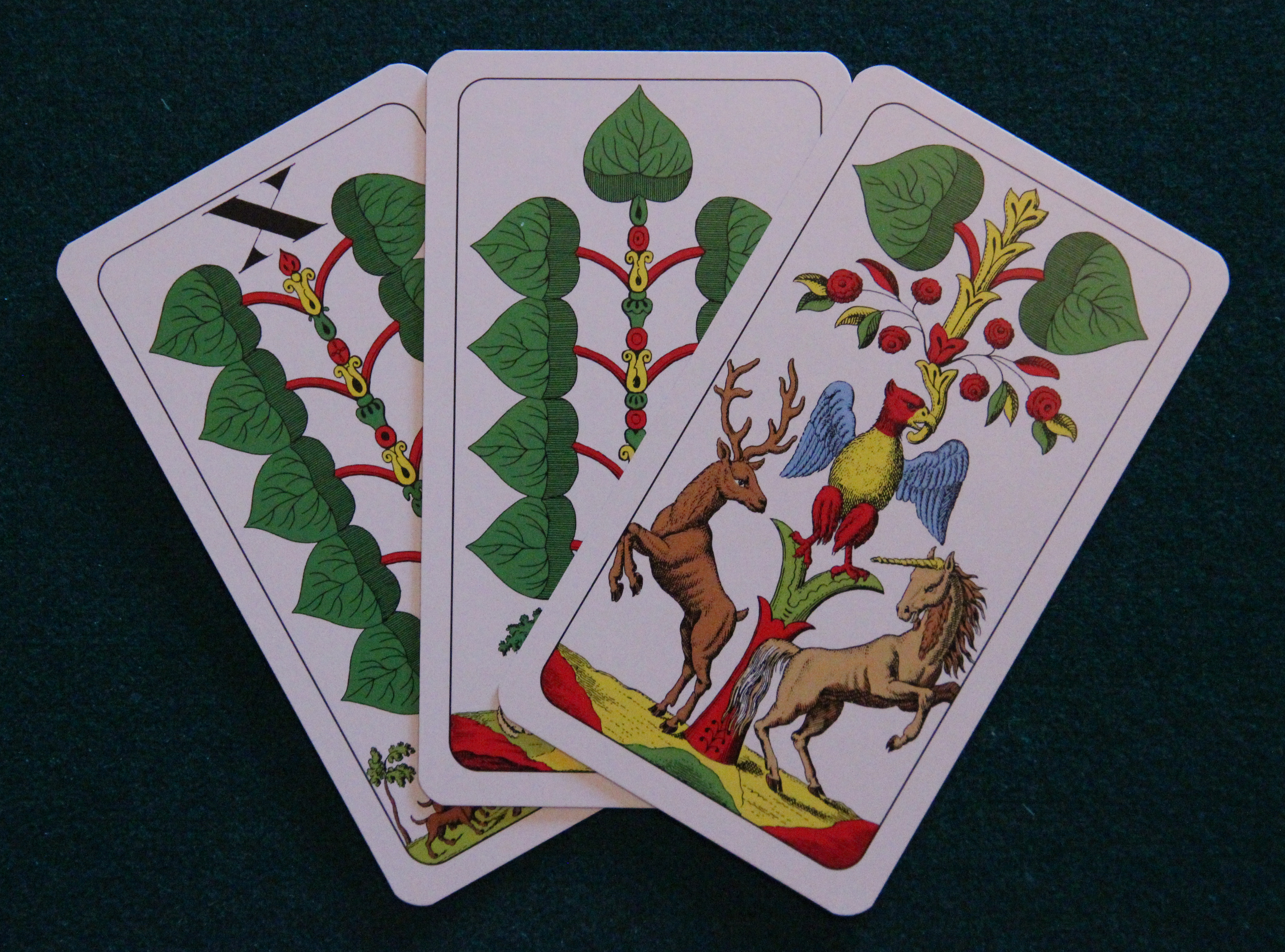
- The highest ranking Leaves in Trischettn
- Origin: South Tyrol, Italy
- Alternative names: Treschetten
- Type: Point-trick
- Family: Tresette group
- Players: 2–4
- Skills: Tactics
- Cards: 32 cards
- Deck: German-suited Salzburg pattern
- Rank (high→low): 10 9 A K O U 8 7
- Play: Counter-clockwise
- Playing time: 25 min
- Chance: Medium

Related games
- Tresette • Pollack • Quatre Septs

Trischettn or Treschetten is an old card game from the South Tyrol for two players. The game is clearly an Austrian variant of Tresette, the major differences being that it is played with a 32-card, German-suited pack rather than a 40-card Italian pack, resulting in a different card ranking, the Tens and Nines becoming the highest rankers in each suit. It also features points for declaring certain combinations such as four Nines. The game is played for 31 points. It used to be one of the three most common card games in South Tyrol, along with Stichwatten and Labbieten, but is threatened with extinction today.

== Overview ==
Having been one of the three most common card games in South Tyrol, together with Stichwatten and Labbieten, Trischettn is nowadays under threat of dying out. Nevertheless there are moves to revive it by teaching Trischettn alongside other traditional South Tyrolean card games. It is closely related to the Italian game of Tresette, albeit played with different packs and a different card ranking, treschetten being South Tyrolese for 'playing tresette'.

The game may be played by two to four players. The rules below are for the two-hand game.

== Cards ==
Trischettn is played with 32 cards from a Salzburg pattern pack, the Sixes being removed. If an Italian Salzburg (Salisburghesi) pack is used, the Fives are also removed. There are no trumps. Cards rank and score as follows:

Ranks and card-point values of cards
Rank	10	9	A	K	O	U	8	7
Value	1/3	1/3	1	1/3	1/3	1/3	–	

Points are scored by collecting the face cards – the Kings, Obers and Unters – as well as the Tens and Nines; each of which scores one third of a point. An Ace scores one full point. Fractional scores are rounded down. Thus there are 10 (strictly 10 2/3 but fractions do not count) points in a pack; with the point for the last trick that makes a total of 11 points available, excluding declarations.

== Playing ==
Eight cards are dealt to each player and the rest are placed face down as a talon. The two players must follow suit and a trick is won by the higher card of the led suit. A player unable to follow suit may discard any card. The winner of a trick draws another card from the talon. The opponent then does likewise, before the trick winner leads to the next trick. Once the talon is exhausted, players continue to play tricks from their hands. A variant rule is that players must reveal their drawn cards each time.

== Declarations ==
During the game, players may also score bonus points for declaring certain card combinations in their hand as follows:

- Three Tens, Nines or Aces: 3 points
- Four Tens, Nines or Aces: 4 points
- Nappele or Napoli (Ten, Nine and Ace) of Hearts, Bells, Leaves or Acorns: 3 points

Players may use cards in more than one declaration e.g. a player may announce three Tens for 3 points and, later, four Tens for an additional point. Declarations may only be made after a player has taken one trick and is 'on lead' to the next trick.

== Scoring ==
Once the last trick has been decided, players tot up their card points and any points won for declarations or taking the last trick. Any fractions are ignored, hence there are 11 points per deal, excluding any bonuses. Game is usually 31 points; occasionally 41 points. Sometimes the first two games are played for 31 and, if a decider is needed, the 3rd game is played for 41. Sometimes games are played for 31, except the last game of the evening which is played to 41.

== Three players ==
When three play, 10 cards are dealt to each player and the remaining two are discarded face-down. Discarding face-up is also allowed, but makes the tactics easier. Otherwise the game is the same as for 2 players.

== Four players ==
With four players, eight cards are dealt to each player. Declarations are only allowed during the first trick and when it is a player's turn. Otherwise the game is same as for 2 players apart from the use of signalling. In the following examples, the speaker is referring to the suit of Bells:

- "I have a Ten": The player plays a Bell in a high arc to the trick
- "I have a Nine": The player slides a Bell sideways before playing to the trick
- "I have an Ace": The player taps a Bell on the table, then plays it to the trick
- "I'm void": The player throws their last Bell into the trick; or taps it on the table as they play it to the trick
- "I have 3 or more": The player pretends to 'sharpen' a Bell against the rest of the cards; or plays a 10 then taps the table with their knuckles
- "Play your Ten and follow with another Bell because I have more": The player plays a low Bell and raps the table with their knuckles
- "Throw your Nine on my Ten because I have more Bells": The player plays the Ten and raps the table as before

If the player's partner signals a high card e.g. a Nine and they want to indicate that they have a low card that they can lead later on for their partner to win the trick, they signal back immediately by playing a card in a large curve across the table (like an exaggerated sign for the Nine).
