= Cicera =

Italian card game

Players score a point for capturing the ten of coins

Cicera bigia (also Ciccera biccera or simply Cicera) is an Italian card game closely related to Scopa and played with a 52-card deck of Bresciane playing cards. It is mainly played in the province of Brescia, and most of the technical terms used in the game originate in the local Bresciano dialect of the Lombard language.

== Deck ==
The game requires a 52 card deck, hence the traditional local deck having 52 cards rather than the 40-card decks typical throughout the rest of Italy - including the 8, 9 and 10 of each suit. The Trentine patterned deck is also produced in an alternate 52-card version for playing dobellone, another game in the Scopa family, but Bresciane cards are the only Italian set to be produced exclusively in a pack of 52 cards as standard.

== Gameplay ==
The game requires four players, each player in partnership with the player opposite. Each player is dealt 12 cards, with the remaining 4 laid face-up on the table.

As in Scopa, players attempt to capture the cards displayed in the centre of the table, by playing a single card on their turn which is equal in value to one of those shown, or equal to the sum of two or more cards shown. Cards numbered 1 (ace) through 10 have the value of their number, whilst the court cards (Jack, Knight and King) have no set value and may only be taken by the same card of another suit.

Play continues to the next player in an anti-clockwise direction, until all cards have been played.

== Scoring ==
=== At the completion of a round ===
At the end of a round, each pair combine their captured cards to calculate their final score. Points are awarded as follows:

Cards (Carte)
The team that took the majority of cards overall (at least 27) receives 2 points. In the case of a tie, 26-26, each team receives one point.
Swords (Spade)
The team that took the majority of cards from the suit of swords (at least 7) receives one point. If a team successfully captures all swords, they automatically win the game, this being called fa Napoleone ("doing Napoleon").
Naples (Napula)
If a team captures the Ace, 2 and 3 of swords, they receive points to the value of the highest card in the uninterrupted sequence of swords they have captured. For example, a team who have captured the Ace, 2, 3, 4, 6 and 7 would receive four points, as the 4 was the highest card in the uninterrupted sequence.
Mata or Beautiful Two (matta, il dó Fino, dó bel, du bel, dó bù, Fìga de Ferr, Felépa sènsa péi)
The team who capture the two of swords receive one point. This is referred to as the "Beautiful Two" (due bello in Italian, dó bel or dó fino in Lombard) analogous to the "Beautiful Seven" (Settebello - seven of coins) in Scopa. A cruder nickname is the figa de ferr (Iron Vulva), referring to the shape made by the two curved swords.
Ten of Coins (Dieci Buono, Dés Bèl, Dés bù)
The team who captured the 10 of coins receives one point.
Jack of Cups (Fànt Col Cà, Fànt Cagnì, Fànt Gob, Fant bel, San Rocc, Fànt bel, Fànt bù)
The team who captured the Jack of Cups receives one point. This card has a number of nicknames translating as the "Jack with the dog" (such as fànt col cà or fànt cagnì in the Bresciano dialect, because in the traditional artwork of the deck of Bresciane cards, the Jack of Cups is portrayed with a dog climbing his right leg. Another nickname is San Rocc, the Lombard name of Saint Roch, patron saint of dogs. The nickname Fànt Cagnì in Bresciano is considered part of the local identity, and is used in the names of some bars, restaurants and other businesses in the city.

=== During the round ===
Scopa (Scùa)
As in the game of Scopa, a player receives a point for each scopa (Italian for broom), the action of playing a card that clears all the remaining cards on the table.
Picada (Picà)
Players receive a point for playing a card of identical value to the one played immediately beforehand.
Simili
Players receive a point for capturing cards with another card of the same suit, such as playing a 7 of coins to collect the 3 and 4 of coins already on the table.
Quaterna
Players receive a point for adding four cards to their captured pile in one play - that is, three cards that were already on the table, plus the fourth used to capture them. These do not necessarily need to be of the same suit.
Cinquina
In very rare cases, one can collect five cards in one play - this is only possible when an Ace, 2, 3 and 4 are present, and are captured with a 10.

=== Combinations ===
Any of the above scoring methods can be combined, for example, if a player uses the 9 of coins to capture the 2, 3 and 4 of coins, they score two points, one for the simili and one for the quaterna. Similarly, if a player plays a certain card on the table when empty, and the next player immediately captures it with a card of the same value, they receive two points (one for scùa and one for picà).
