= Calabresella =

Italian trick-taking card game

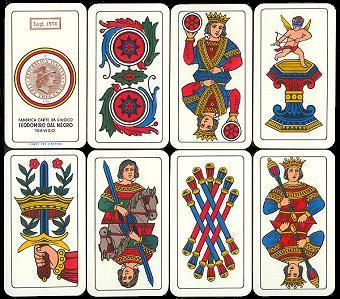
- Origin: Italy
- Alternative names: Terziglio
- Type: Trick taking
- Family: Tresette group
- Players: 3
- Skills: Tactics
- Cards: 40 cards
- Deck: Italian
- Rank (high→low): 3 2 A R C F 7 6 5 4
- Play: Counter-clockwise
- Playing time: 25 min
- Chance: Medium

Related games
- Tressette

Calabresella, Calabragh, sometimes spelled Calabrasella, "the little Calabrian game", also known as Terziglio, is an Italian trick-taking card game variation of Tressette for three players, but it can be played by four with the dealer receiving no cards for the hand. One of the earliest references of the game dates from 1822.

== Object ==
The overall aim is to be the first to make a score of 21 points. In each deal, one person, known as the soloist, plays against the other two with the aim of capturing in tricks cards totalling at least 6 of the 11 points available for counters and the last trick. The soloist is determined by auction. The game moves to the right.

Calabresella is played with an Italian pack, consisting of a King (Re), Knight/Cavalier (Cavallo, literally meaning Horse), and a Knave (Fante, literally meaning Footsoldier) and the pip cards 7, 6, 5, 4, 3, 2, ace in 4 suits of Batons (Bastoni), Swords (Spade), Cups (Coppe) and Coins (Danari). The rather unusual rank of the cards goes as follows:

- 3-2-A-R-C-F-7-6-5-4.

== Rules ==
Each player receives twelve cards, dealt four at a time. The remainder forms the stock, which is left face downwards. The auction begins with the player at the dealer's right and proceeds counter-clockwise. Each player has a single chance to bid or pass. Each bid must be higher (later in the list) than the last.

- Chiamo: The Soloist may demand any card he chooses, giving a card in exchange. If the three demanded are in stock, no other card may be asked for before exchanging cards in the stock.
- Solo: The Soloist exchanges cards with the stock but does not call a card.
- Solissimo: The soloist plays without the stock, or monte. In a normal Solissimo, no one sees the stock cards until they are won by the winner of the last trick at the end of the play. He may choose to increase the stake by saying dividete or scegliete, which turns the game into a Solissimo aggravato.
  - Solissimo dividete: If he says "half each" the other players exchange exactly 2 cards each with the stock without showing them, and makes any two discards face down.
  - Solissimo scegliete: if he says "you choose" the other players turn the four cards face up on the table and may agree to split them 2-2, 3-1, or 4-0, and each discards face down as many as he took.

The dealer has the last option. If one person announces the highest contract, the others team up against him. If all decline to play, the deal passes and the hands are abandoned.

== The play ==
The player on the dealer's right leads first. The highest card wins the trick, there being no trumps. Players must follow suit if possible. The single player and the allies, respectively, collect all the tricks they win.

== Scoring ==
The values of the cards are:

- Each ace is worth 1 point.
- 3,2 and Court Cards are worth 1/3 of a point (fractions in the total are not counted).

Card points are used to calculate who won the game. If the soloist won at least 6 points, he is credited with the score for the games:

1. Chiamo (Call): 1 game point
2. Solo: 2 game points
3. Solissimo: 4 game points
4. Solissimo aggravato:
- Solissimo dividete: 8 game points
- Solissimo sceliete: 16 game points.

The card points are not added to game points, but are only used to calculate who wins the game.

- Cappotto: if the bidder wins or loses all the tricks, the amount won or lost is doubled.
- Stramazzo: if the bidder wins all the points without winning all the tricks, or if he loses all the points without losing all the tricks, that is, if the tricks won by the losing side contain less than one point, the amount won or lost is then multiplied by three.

== See also ==
- Trappola
- Tarot
- Truc
