= Pollack (card game) =

German card game

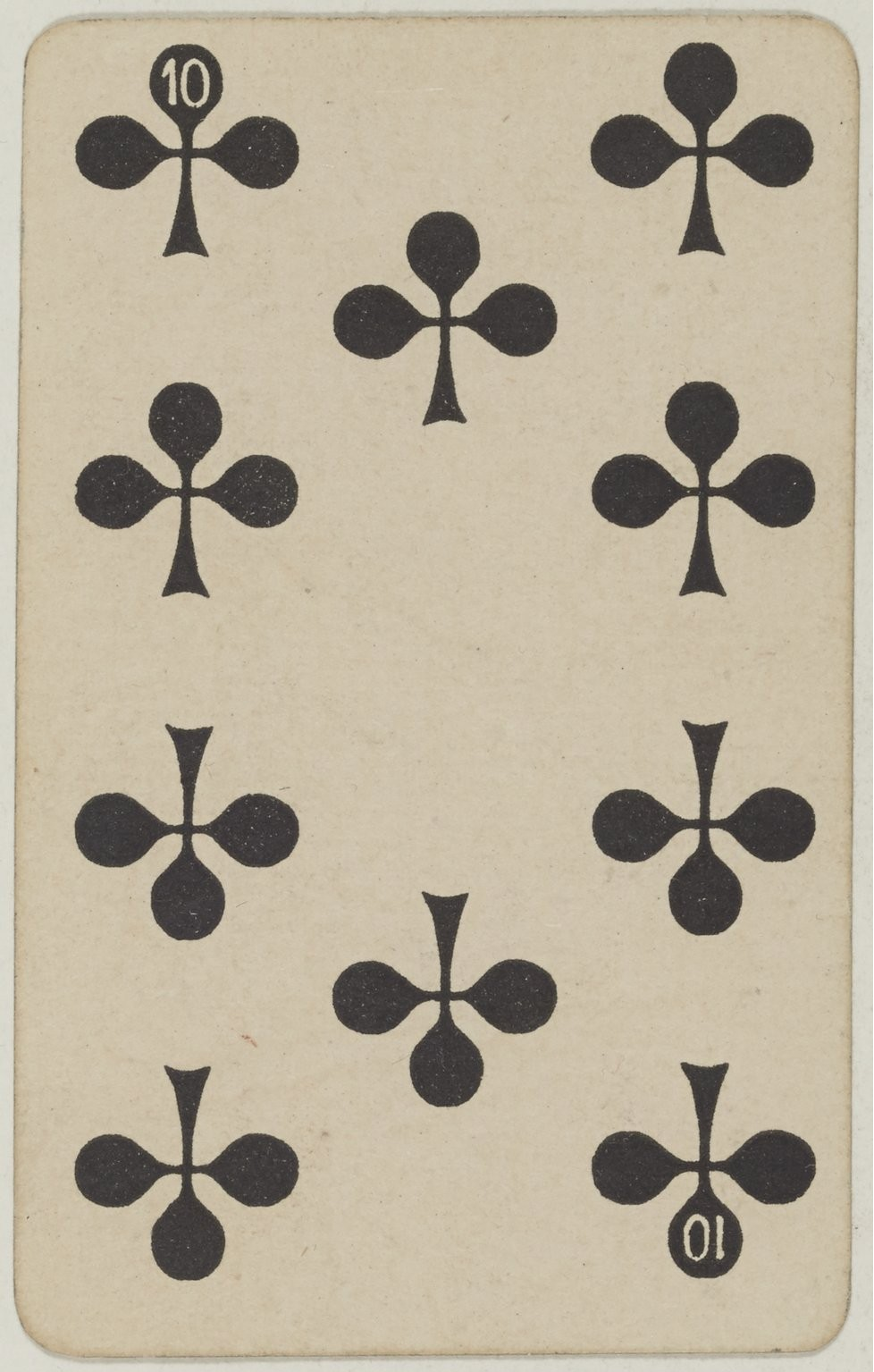
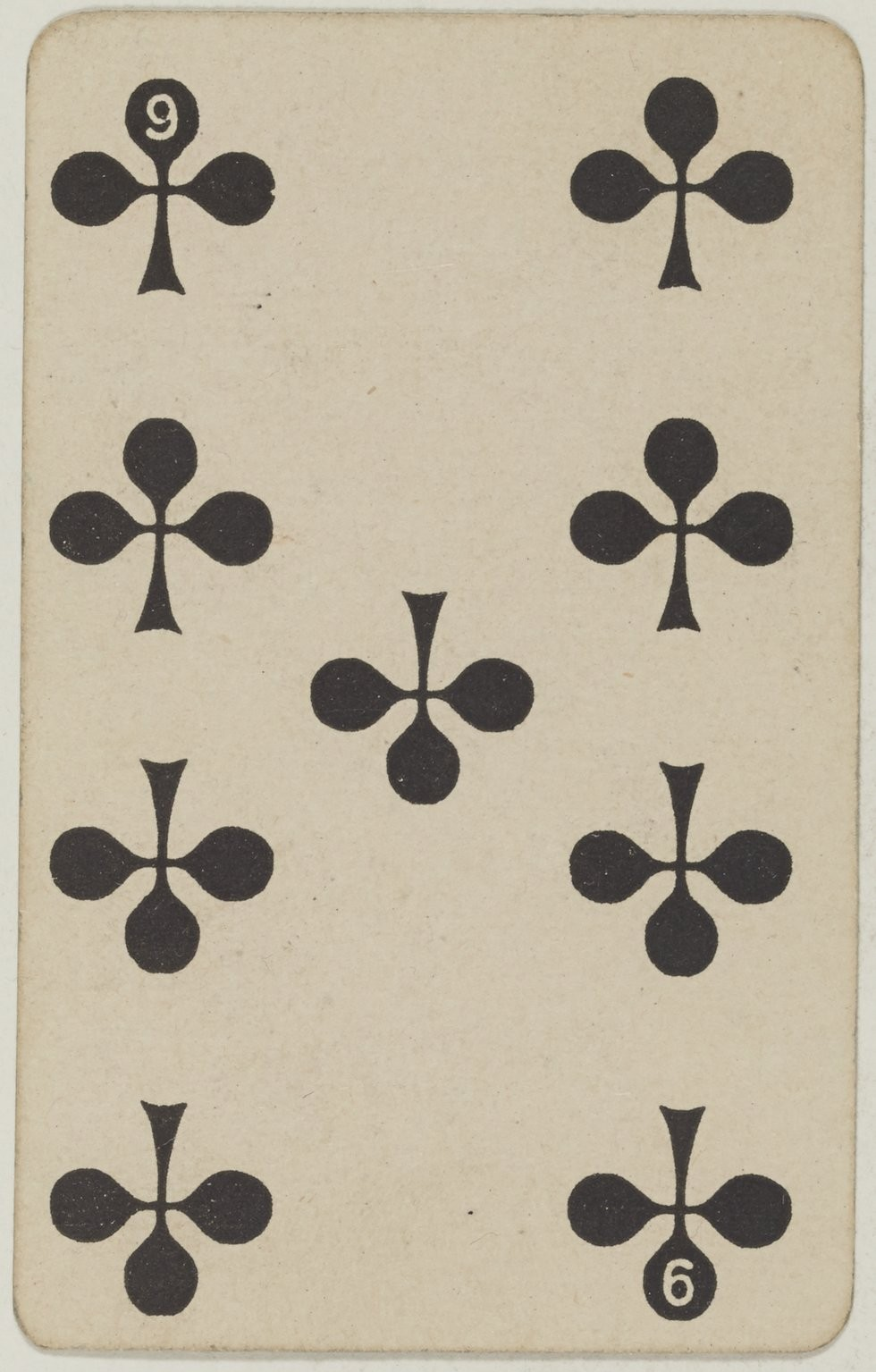
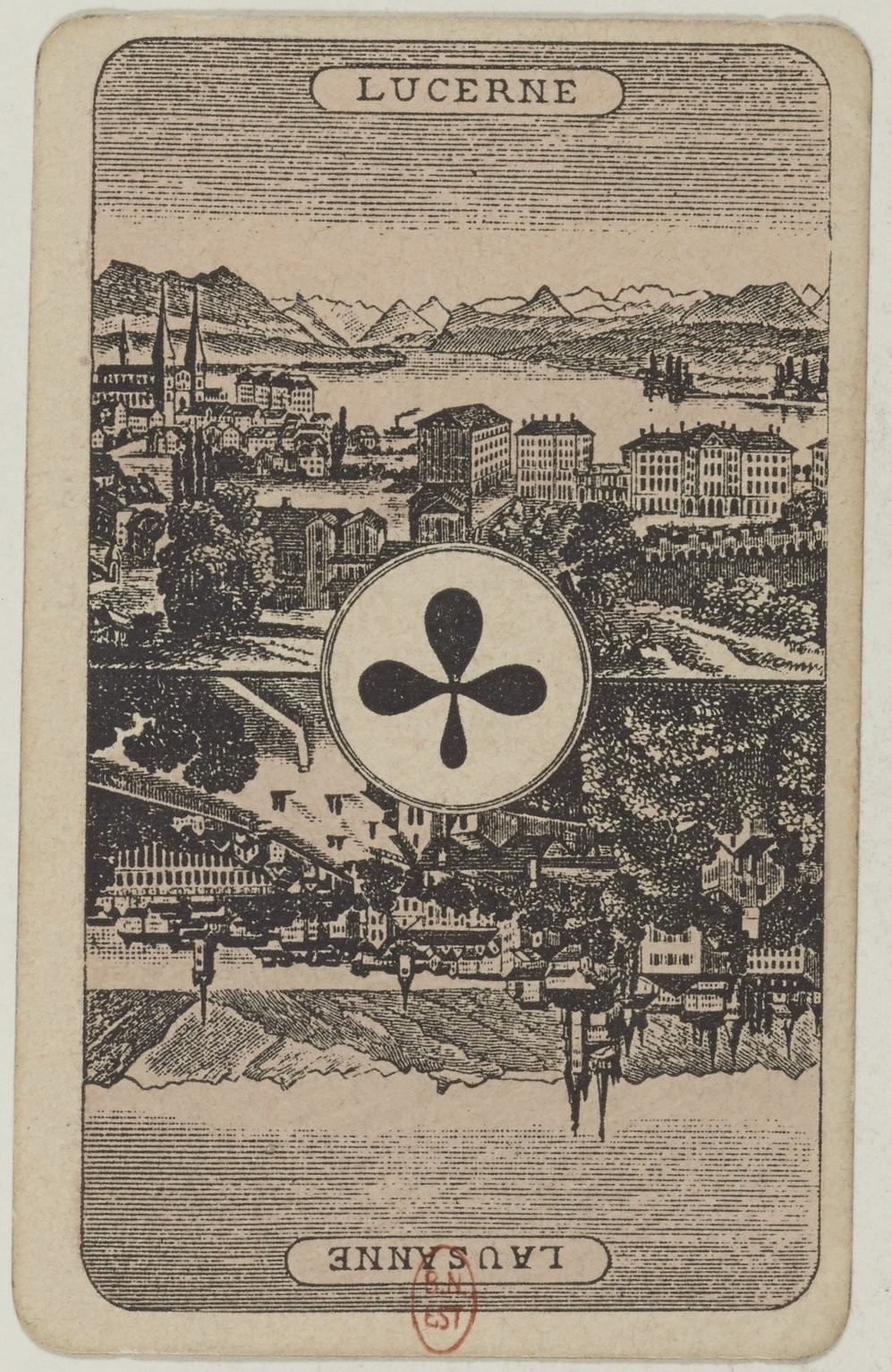
- The top trumps if Clubs are the trump suit
- Origin: Germany
- Type: Point-trick
- Family: Tresette group
- Players: 4
- Skills: Tactics
- Cards: 32 cards
- Deck: French or German-suited
- Rank (high→low): 10 9 A K Q J 8 7 or 10 9 D K O U 8 7
- Play: Clockwise
- Playing time: 25 min
- Chance: Medium

Related games
- Tresette, Trischettn, Quatre Sept

Pollack is a German card game for four players in two teams of two that resembles the Italian game of Tresette, the aim being to score as many points as possible by taking tricks containing point-scoring cards and by announcing certain hand combinations as bonuses. According to Gööck, new players quickly realise that there is quite a lot to it and only those who stay alert get opportunities to score. The game is named after a bonus for holding its three top cards: the Ten, Nine, and Ace of one suit.

== History ==
Pollack appeared in Germany as a "new game" in the 1850s and quickly became popular in "public places", especially in Berlin. However, its scoring system is identical with that of the Italian game of Tresette, albeit the latter is played with 40, rather than 32, cards. It has surfaced sporadically in the literature since. Anton reprints it in 1879, Von Hahn records it in 1905, Gööck in 1967 and Feder in 1980. It is also described in a 1981 Swedish book of card games by Holmström.

The rules are also similar to the game of Le Quatre Sept in which, however, a combination of four Sevens wins the game, hence the name. This French Canadian variant has the alternative names of La Politaine, which recalls 'Napolitaine', the top scoring combination in Tresette. Another name is La Poule which may be a shortening of La Politaine and which bears phonetic similarities to Pollack.

== Rules ==
The rules vary little. The following are based on Von Alvensleben.

=== Cards ===
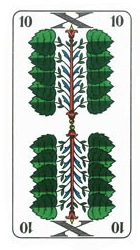
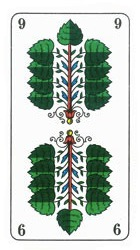
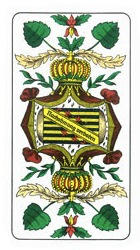
A pollack: the Ten, Nine and Deuce of Leaves.

A 32-card French or German-suited pack may be used. The Nines and Tens are promoted to be the highest-ranking cards, so cards rank in the order: 10 > 9 > A > K > Q > J > 8 > 7 for French-suited cards or 10 > 9 > A > K > O > U > 8 > 7 for German ones. Although the Aces ranks below the Ten and Nine, in terms of card value it is the highest, being worth 3 points. All other cards are worth 1 point except for the Eights and Sevens which are blanks.

=== Preliminaries ===
Players form two teams of two, the partners being determined by lots. To do this the players each draw a card at random and of unequal value. The player with the lowest card chooses his seat and becomes the dealer. The player with the next lowest is his partner and sits opposite; the next player sits to his left and is partnered by the fourth player who sits to the dealer's right. The dealer then shuffles, offers the pack to his right for cutting and deals each player 8 cards, in clockwise order, in packets of 3, 3 and 2.

=== Announcements ===
In addition to the points scored by cards in the tricks, players also score points for certain combinations of cards in their hands which they announce during the game. Forehand (to the left of the dealer) may make an announcement before leading to the first trick. Other players may only announce after their team has won a trick. The following announcements and bonus points are recognised:

- Three Tens, Nines or Aces - 3 points
- Four Tens, Nines or Aces - 4 points
- Pollack (Ten, Nine and Ace of same suit) - 3 points

=== Playing ===
Trick play is clockwise beginning with forehand. There are no trumps. Players must follow suit, but do not need to head the trick. Winning the last trick is worth 3 points.

=== Scoring ===
At the end of the deal, points are added up and divided by three, any fractions being discarded. Since the Aces are worth 3 each, and the Kings, Queens, Jacks, Tens and Nines 1 point each, the cards are therefore worth 12/3 + ((5 × 4))/3 = 10 2/3. The 3 points for the last trick are also divided by three, making a total of 11 2/3, so each deal is worth 11 points excluding any announcements.

The first team to score 21 points wins the partie and there are six parties in a game or session. A team that is close to 21 may either announce this during the deal, either from their hand if on lead or after taking a trick that brings them to 21. If the first team to 21 fails or forgets to announce it and the opposing team announces they have reached 21, the second team wins even though the first team already had 21 points. After each partie, the slate is wiped clean and scoring starts again.

If, at the end of a deal, neither team has announced a win, but both teams have 21 or more points, the team with the most points wins the partie. If scores are level, e.g. 22 apiece, the team that took the last trick wins.

== Literature ==
- Anton, Friedrich (1879). Encyclopädie der Spiele, 3rd edn. Wigand, Leipzig.
- Feder, Jan (1980). Die schönsten Kartenspiele: Über 100 Variationen mit dem Skatblatt. 2nd edn. Droemersche Verlagsanstalt Th. Kanur Nachf., Freising. ISBN 3-426-07628-4
- Gööck, Roland (1967). Freude am Kartenspiel, Bertelsmann, Gütersloh.
- Holmström, Björn (1981). Stora Kortspelsboken. Stockholm: Prisma. ISBN 91-518-1446-3
- Von Alvensleben, L. (1853). Encyclopädie der Spiele: enthaltend alle bekannten Karten-, Bret-, Kegel-, Billard-, Ball-, Würfel-Spiele und Schach. Otto Wigand, Leipzig.
- von Hahn, Alban (1905). Das Buch der Spiele. Otto Spamer, Leipzig.
