= Dal Negro =

Italian playing card publisher

- Industry: Manufacturing
- Founded: 1928
- Founder: Teodomiro Dal Negro
- Headquarters: Carbonera, Treviso, Italy
- Products: Playing cards, tarot cards, poker chips, roulette wheels, children's toys
- Number of employees: 57 (2013)
- Website: Dalnegro.com

Dal Negro is an Italian company that produces playing cards, tarot cards, divination cards, chess, backgammon, roulette wheels, and toys for children.

The company has its registered office, from 2002, in Carbonera in the Treviso area.

Its origins date back to 1756, as a factory of playing cards, owned by an Austrian situated in the city of Treviso. It was purchased in 1928 by Dal Negro family. For decades it had several locations in the town of Treviso, before arriving in the new location. In 2003, it bought rival Masenghini but has kept the brands separate. The following year, it acquired Milan-based NTP, which produces plastic playing cards.

In recent years the company has increased the production of Tarot decks, which also include a deck made by the Nobel Prize for Literature, Dario Fo.

In 2009 the company expanded its business by starting the production of wooden games for children, also obtaining the exclusive right to import Lego-compatible bricks produced by the Polish company Cobi, and importing Engino games from Cyprus. Equipped with solar panels, high-tech gears and levers.

== Tarot by Dal Negro ==
- Tarot guess - I guess Tarot (1978), invented and illustrated by Sergio Ruffolo.
- Bizarre Tarot - Tarot Bizarre (1980), invented and illustrated by Franco Bruna.
- Tarot of the Stars - Tarot of the Stars (1991), invented and illustrated by Gio Tavaglione.
- Mitelli's Tarot - Tarocchini of Mitelli (1995), reprint of the original deck printed by Giuseppe Maria Mitelli in the 1660s.
- Visconti Tarots - Tarot Visconti (1997), reprint of the original deck painted by an artist anonymous 1460 approx.
- Romeo and Juliet: Shakespeare Tarot - Tarot of Shakespeare (1998), invented and illustrated by Louis Scarpini .
- Stained-glass windows Tarot - Tarot Stained Glass (1999), invented and illustrated by Louis and Julia Scarpini.
- Dario Fo's Tarot - Tarot Dario Fo (2002), invented and illustrated by Dario Fo and Dominique Gobbo.
- Lukumi Tarot - Tarot Lukumi (2003), invented by Coulter Emanuele Guidi, illustrated by Louis Scarpini.
- Bacchus Tarot - Tarot of Bacchus (2005), invented by Giordano Berti, illustrated by Louis and Julia Scarpini.
- Venice Tarot - Tarot of Venice (2007), invented by Giordano Berti, illustrated by David Tonato.

== Regional cards produced by Dal Negro ==
Dal Negro produces 16 varieties of regional Italian cards, as well as cards from other countries in Europe.

- No. 20: Toscane (Fiorentine)
- No. 24/D: Salisburghesi (Salzburger)
- No. 25/S: Jass
- No. 26 S: Piquet
- No. 35: Genovesi
- No. 45/S: Milanesi (Lombarde)
- No. 81: Napoletane
- No. 89: Bresciane
- No. 91: Trentine
- No. 92: Triestine
- No. 94: Bergamasche
- No. 95: Romagnole
- No. 99: Sarde
- No. 114: Trevisane
- Piacentine
- Piemontesi
- Siciliane

== Regional cards produced by Masenghini ==
- No. 21: Cuccù
- No. 36: Napoletane
- No. 54: Toscane
