= Italian playing cards =

Playing card decks used in Italy

Regional patterns in Italy. French suits: 1. Piemontesi; 2. Lombarde; 3. Genovesi; 4. Toscane (Fiorentine); German suits: 5. Salisburghesi; Italian suits: 6. Bergamasche; 7. Bresciane; 8. Trentine; 9. Trevigiane; 10. Triestine; 11. Primiera Bolognese; Spanish suits: 12. Piacentine; 13. Romagnole; 14. Napoletane; 15. Siciliane; 16. Sarde

Playing cards (in Italian: carte da gioco) have been in Italy since the late 14th century. Until the mid 19th century, Italy was composed of many smaller independent states which led to the development of various regional patterns of playing cards; "Italian suited cards" normally only refer to cards originating from northeastern Italy around the former Republic of Venice, which are largely confined to northern Italy, parts of Switzerland, Dalmatia and southern Montenegro. Other parts of Italy traditionally use traditional local variants of Spanish suits, French suits or German suits.

As Latin-suited cards, Italian and Spanish suited cards use swords (spade), cups (coppe), coins (denari), and clubs (bastoni). All Italian suited decks have three face cards per suit: the fante (Knave), cavallo (Knight), and re (King), unless it is a tarocchi deck in which case a donna or regina (Queen) is inserted between the cavallo and re. Popular games include Scopa, Briscola, Tressette, Bestia, and Sette e mezzo.

== History ==
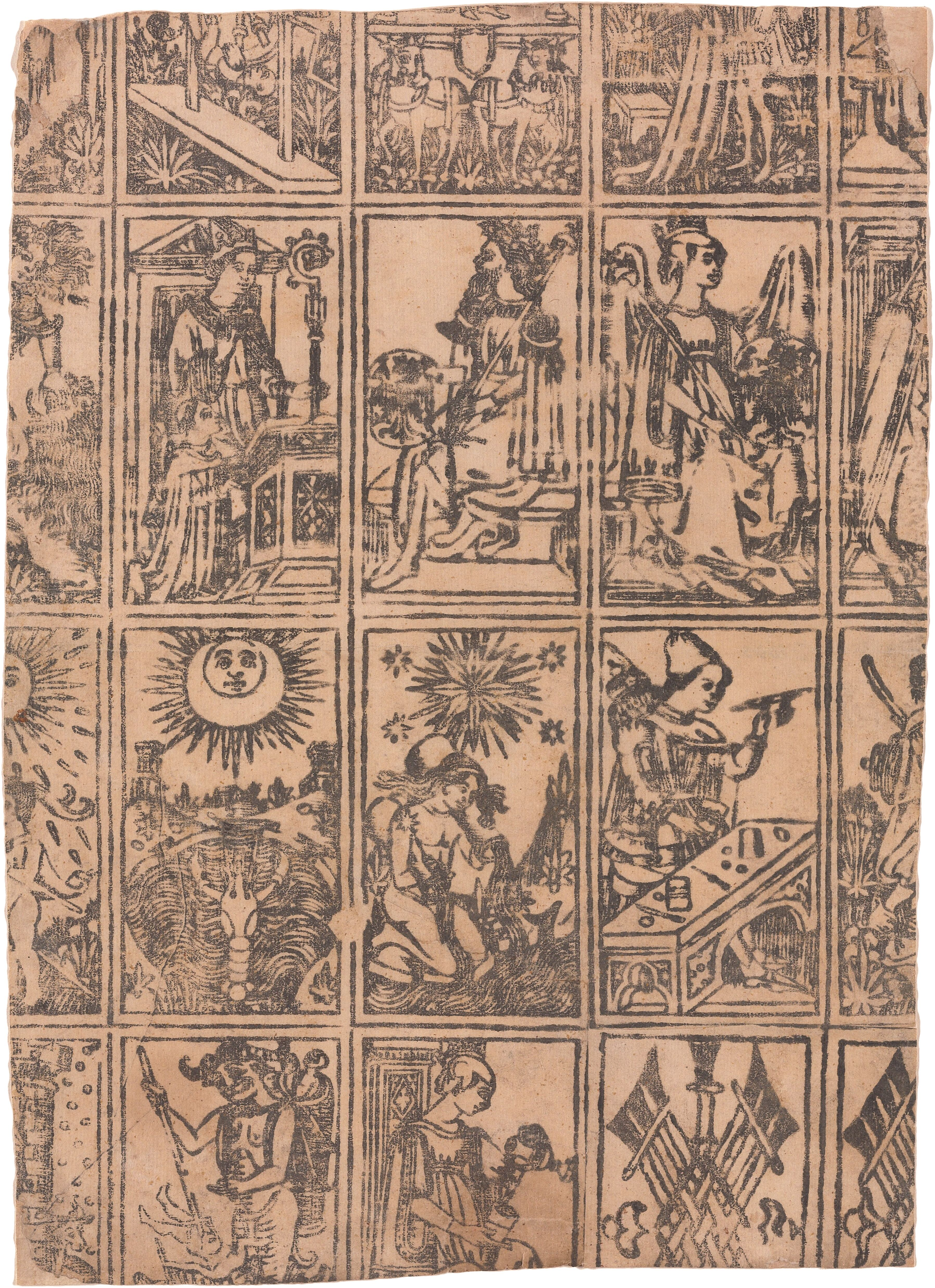
Milanese tarocchi c. 1500

Playing cards arrived from Mamluk Egypt during the 1370s. Mamluk cards used suits of cups, coins, swords, and polo-sticks. As polo was an obscure sport, Italians changed them into batons. Italy was a collection of small states so each region developed its own variations. Southern Italy was under strong Spanish influence so their cards closely resemble the ones in Spain. Northern Italian suits used curved swords instead of straight ones and their clubs are ceremonial batons instead of cudgels. Swords and clubs also intersect unlike their Spanish counterparts.

Tarot cards were invented during the early 15th century in northern Italy as a permanent suit of trumps (trionfi). Italian-suited cards are rarely found outside of Northern Italy. In the past, however, tarot cards based on those from Milan, the Tarot of Marseilles, spread to France and Switzerland in the 16th century and later to Austria and parts of Western Germany in the 18th century before being replaced by French-suited tarots during the 18th and 19th centuries. In a few places in Switzerland, the Italian-suited Swiss 1JJ Tarot is still used for games.

The Venetian game of Trappola also spread northwards to Germany, Austria-Hungary, and Poland until dying out in the mid-20th century. The Greek word for playing card, "Τράπουλα", is a transliteration of Trappola. It may have entered into the Greek language from the Venetian-occupied Ionian Islands during the 16th century. In Corfu, Aspioti-ELKA produced Venetian pattern cards until the Greco-Italian War.

40-card stripped decks lacking the 8s, 9s, and 10s are the most common format found in Italy today. This is the result of popular 16th and 17th century games like Primero and Ombre. From the second half of the twentieth century, some Italian manufacturers have added a pair of Jokers but not to stripped decks.

=== Tax stamp ===
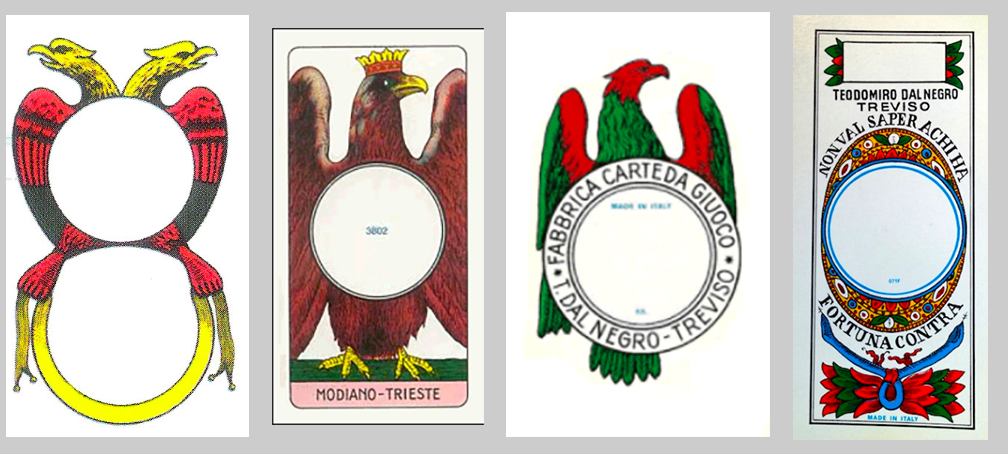
Ace of Coins showing the blank circles for tax stamps. L-R Napoletane, Piacentine, Siciliane, Trevisane

Until 1972, all decks of playing cards sold in Italy had to bear a stamp showing that the manufacturer had paid the appropriate amount of tax. This led to a characteristic of most regional Italian designs in having a particular card (generally the Ace of Coins) either having a blank circle in the design, or having only a small amount of artwork compared with the rest of the deck. In addition to this, most Spanish-suited regional styles have the Ace of Coins including an eagle. This style of design has persisted, even after the discontinuation of the tax stamp requirement.

== Italian-suited decks ==
Italian suits
Suits Bergamasche				
Suits Trevigiane				
Suits Triestine				
Suits Trentine				
Suits Bresciane				
Suits Bolognesi				
(Italy)	Spade	Coppe	Denari	Bastoni
(United Kingdom)	Swords	Cups	Coins	Batons

The (northern) Italian traditional card designs are closely related to the Spanish, sharing the same suits of cups, coins, swords and clubs. However, there are notable visual differences, including that the clubs are drawn as straight ceremonial batons, rather than as rough cudgels (or tree branches) as in a Spanish-suited deck, and that the swords are curved like a scimitar as opposed to a European sword like in the Spanish-suited deck. Furthermore, the Cups in northern Italian designs tend to be more angular, often hexagonal, as opposed to the circular goblet with handles in Spanish-suited designs.

=== Trentine, Bresciane, and Bergamasche ===
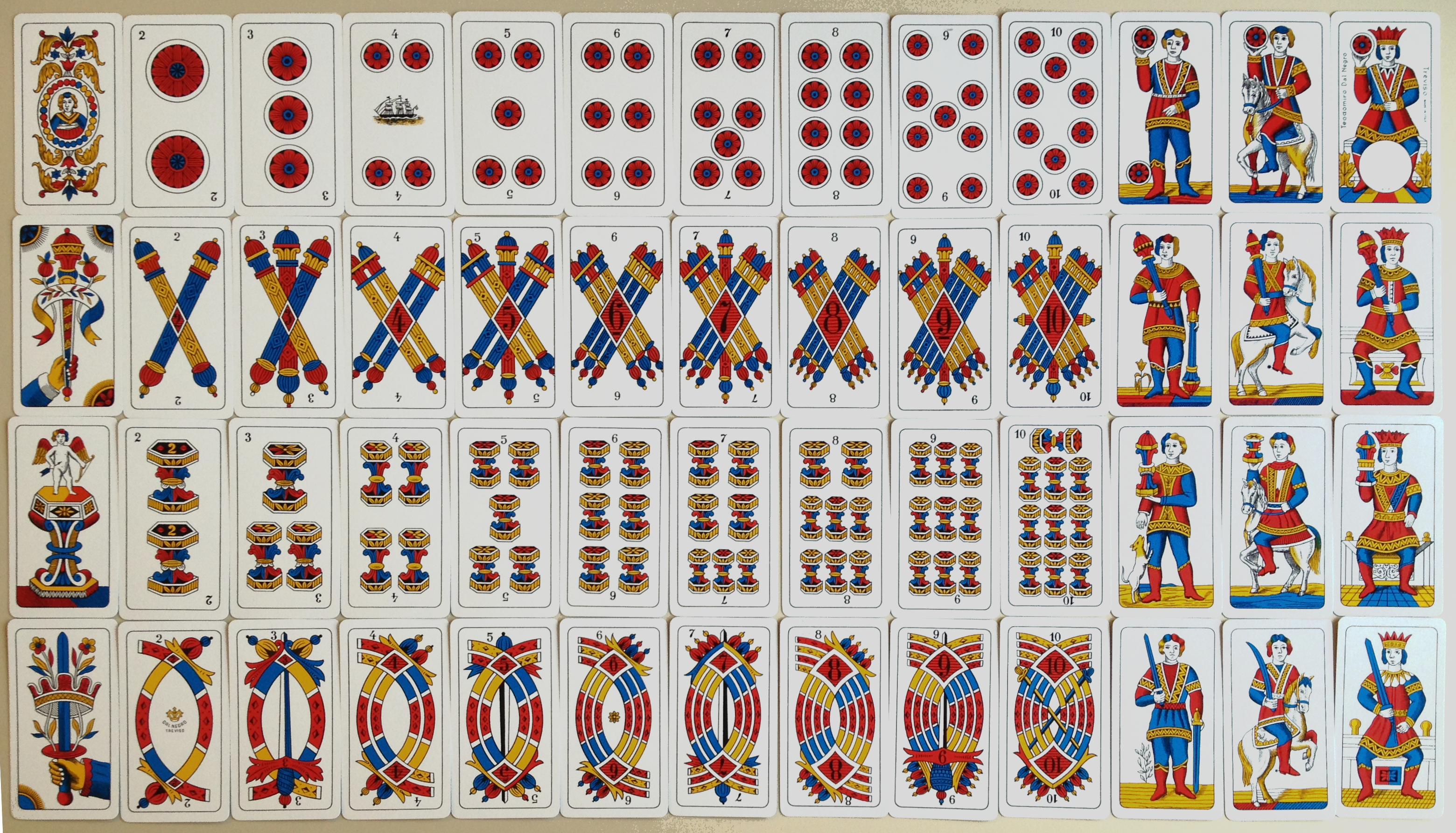
Trentine deck

These three patterns are closely related, having been formed in close proximity to one another. The Trentine pattern is believed to be the oldest surviving Italian pattern and the origin of the Bresciane and Bergamasche patterns. Trappola cards may also have originated from this pattern.

Trentine cards are sold in either packs of 40 or 52. The smaller deck is missing the 8s through 10s. The larger deck comes with a pair of Jokers. All the Kings sit on thrones and the cards are not reversible. The cards utilize only five colors: black, white, red, blue, and yellow which has led to face cards with blue, yellow, and red hair. Trentine pip cards also have numerals though not always in the corner. These cards are wider than the two below.

The Bresciane deck comes only in sets of 52 cards and are not reversible. The cards are slightly more colorful, adding green and brown. Only the 7 and 9 of Swords are numbered and they are found within the pips. The full 52-card Bresciane deck is used for the traditional local game cicera bigia, as an alternative to removing the 8s, 9s and 10s to create the standard Italian 40-card deck for games such as Briscola and Scopa.

The Bergamasche pattern comes in decks of 40 cards only. They are reversible or double-headed, meaning they can be turned upside down. None of the pip cards are numbered and color is added to the faces of the characters.

Bresciane deck

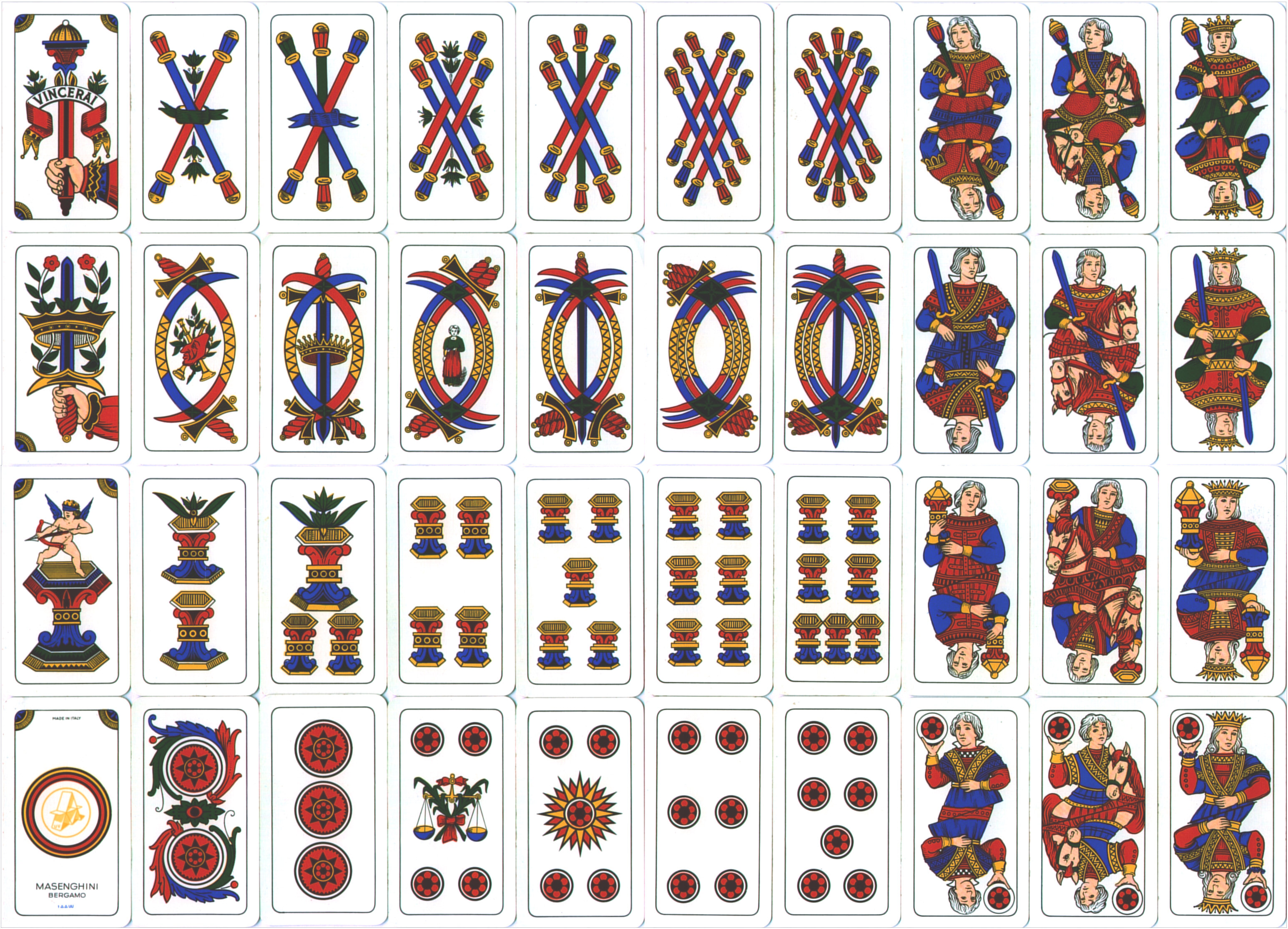
Bergamasche deck

=== Trevisane and Triestine ===
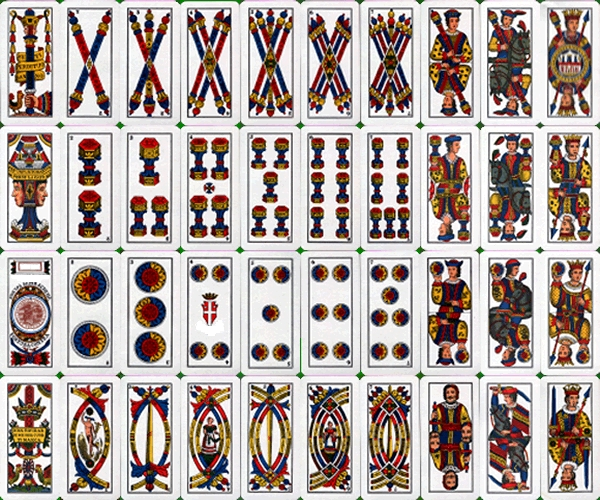
Trevisane deck

The Trevisane deck, also known as the Trevigiane, Venetian or Veneto deck, comes in sets of 40 or 52. The smaller set is missing ranks 8 through 10 while the larger often includes two Jokers to bump it up to 54 cards. The face cards are reversible and the pip cards have corner indices.

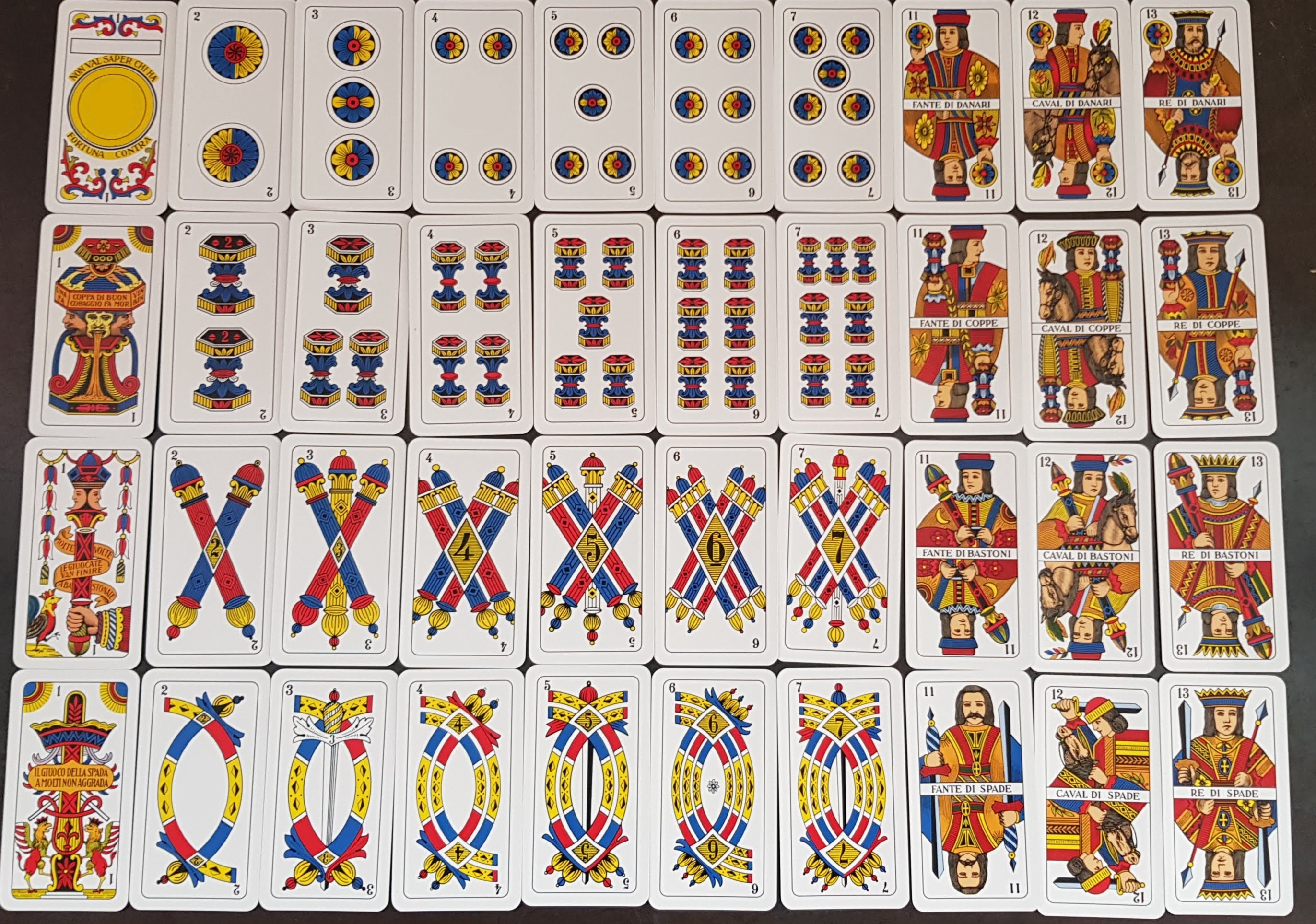
Triestine deck

Closely related is the Triestine pack, which was created in the mid-19th century and was once available in 52 card sets but now only 40 card decks are sold. Though ranks 8 through 10 were removed, the face cards are still numbered 11 through 13. The face cards are reversible with each half separated by a white caption box that labels the card. This is the only deck in which both face cards and pip cards are numbered though not always in the corner. This pattern is also found on Croatia's and Slovenia's coast, corresponding with the Venetian Republic's Stato da Màr.

=== Primiera Bolognese and Tarocco Bolognese ===
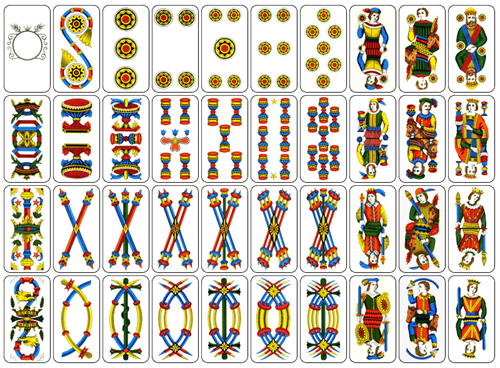
Primiera Bolognese deck

Cards from Bologna are sold in two sets, the 40 card Primiera Bolognese set and the 62 card Tarocco Bolognese set. The Primiera set is used for standard games like Primero while the Tarocco set is used to play Tarocchini. The Primiera set goes from ranks Ace to 7, Knave, Knight, and King. The Tarocco set goes from ranks 6 to 10, Knave, Knight, Queen, King, and Ace. All ranks that they share in common appear very similar but are not identical.

The Tarocco set's trump cards are also different from other tarot decks. While it has 21 trump cards, only trumps 5 to 16 are numbered and four of the lower trumps are considered equal. The Fool or Bagatto is an unnumbered trump and ranks as the lowest. All the face cards and trumps are reversible. Tarocco sets by Dal Negro includes two Jokers that aren't used in any tarocchini games.

=== Tarocco Piemontese and Swiss 1JJ ===
The Tarocco Piemontese is a 78-card tarot deck from Piedmont and the most popular tarot playing deck in Italy. It is derived from the Tarot of Marseilles. Unlike the traditional Piemontesi deck which uses French suits, the tarot deck uses Italian suits. The Fool is numbered as 0 despite not being a trump card. Trumps and most pip cards have indices in modern Arabic numerals (for trumps, cups, and coins) or Roman numerals (for swords and batons). The face cards and trumps are reversible. Dal Negro's decks include two Jokers that aren't used for tarot games.

Swiss 1JJ is a 78-card tarot set descended from the Tarot of Besançon, an offshoot of the Marseilles tarot, and is still used in pockets of Switzerland. Despite having Italian suits, the trumps are labelled in French or German. They are not reversible and the trumps and pip cards use Roman numeral indexing. They are used by the Romansh to play Troccas and by German Swiss to play Troggu.

== French-suited decks ==
French suits
Suits				
(Italy)	Cuori	Quadri	Fiori	Picche
(United Kingdom)	Hearts	Squares	Flowers	Pikes

=== Lombarde (Milanesi), Genovesi, Toscane and Piemontesi ===
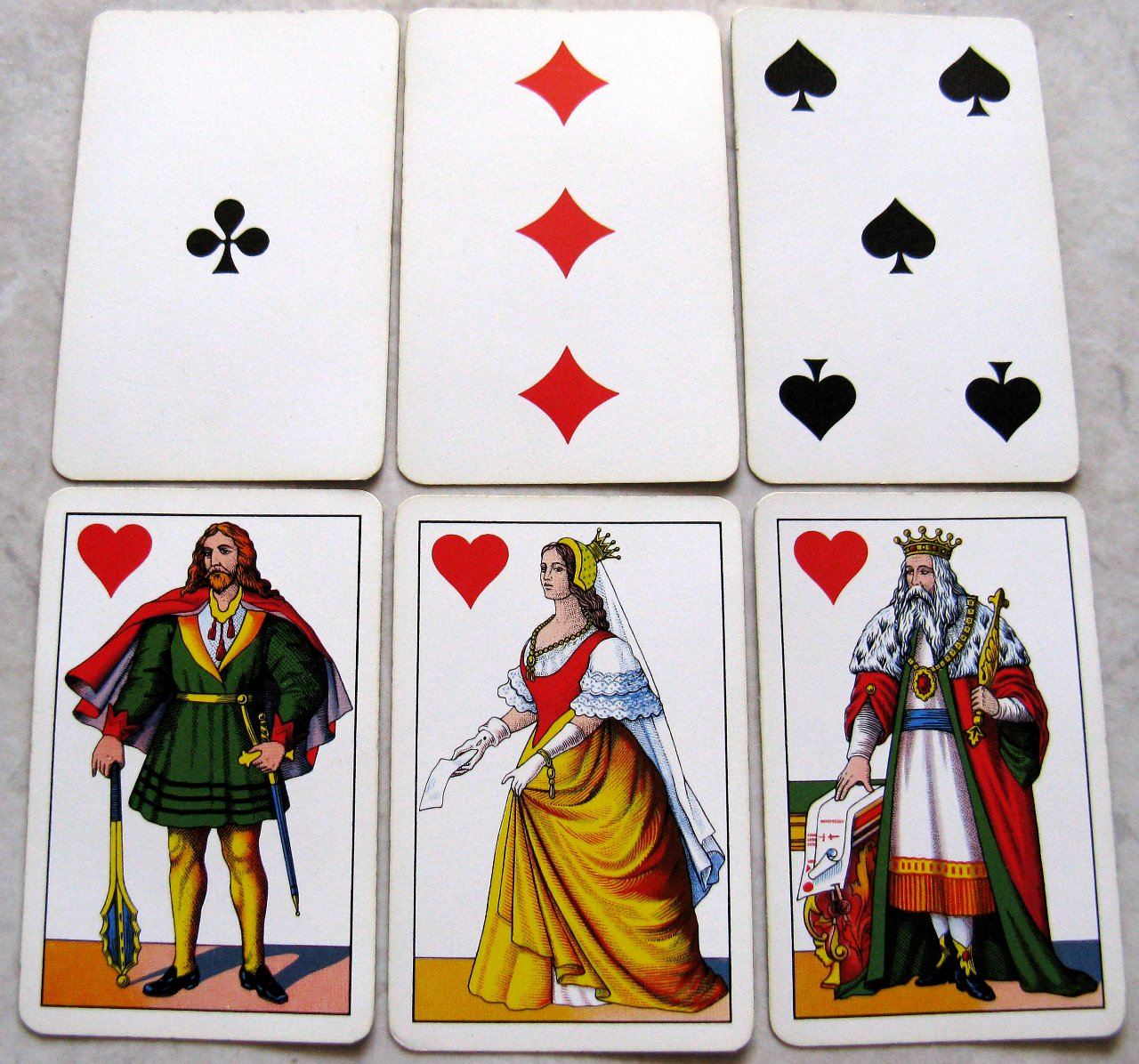
Toscane pattern

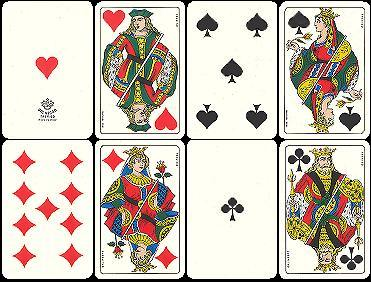
Genovesi pattern

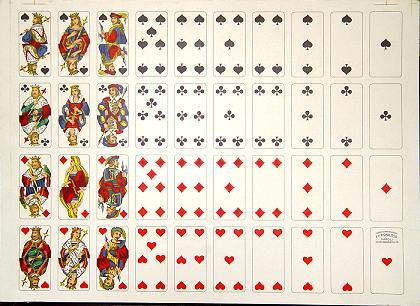
Lombarde/Milanesi pattern

The regional styles of north-western Italy use the French suits of Hearts (cuori), Diamonds (quadri, literally "squares"), Spades (picche, "pikes") and Clubs (fiori, literally "flowers").

They differ from French or international standard decks in that they generally lack numbered side pips, and have characteristic court card designs for the King (re or regio), Queen (donna) and Knave (Gobbo or Fante).

Toscane and Fiorentine playing cards feature single-headed court cards featuring a full portrait, whereas the other three styles feature double-headed court cards. The Kings are distinguished from the Jacks by the crowns. Fiorentine cards come in packs of 40, measure 101 mm × 67 mm (4 in × 2 1/2 in) and have a more detailed design. Meanwhile the Toscane cards are similar but smaller, measuring just 88 mm × 58 mm (3 1/2 in × 2 1/2 in). There was an old Toscane pattern which was distinguished by its uncrowned Queens, less ornate clothing on the courts and Kings holding short sceptres or batons. In Tuscany, Diamonds are generally called mattoni, especially in Florentine.

Piemontese Ace cards feature a decorative wreath around the suit symbol - originally this was absent on the Ace of Hearts, but modern decks increasingly include the wreath on all four Aces.

The Genovesi deck (sometimes called the Belgian-Genoese Deck) is used in the northern Italian town of Genoa and the surrounding region of Liguria. It is strongly similar to the Belgian Deck, though lacking corner indices, and reminiscent of the French portrait officiel, the only difference being the choice of colour on the portraits. It was designed initially as an export version of the standard French pattern in the Spanish Netherlands.

=== Nuoresi ===
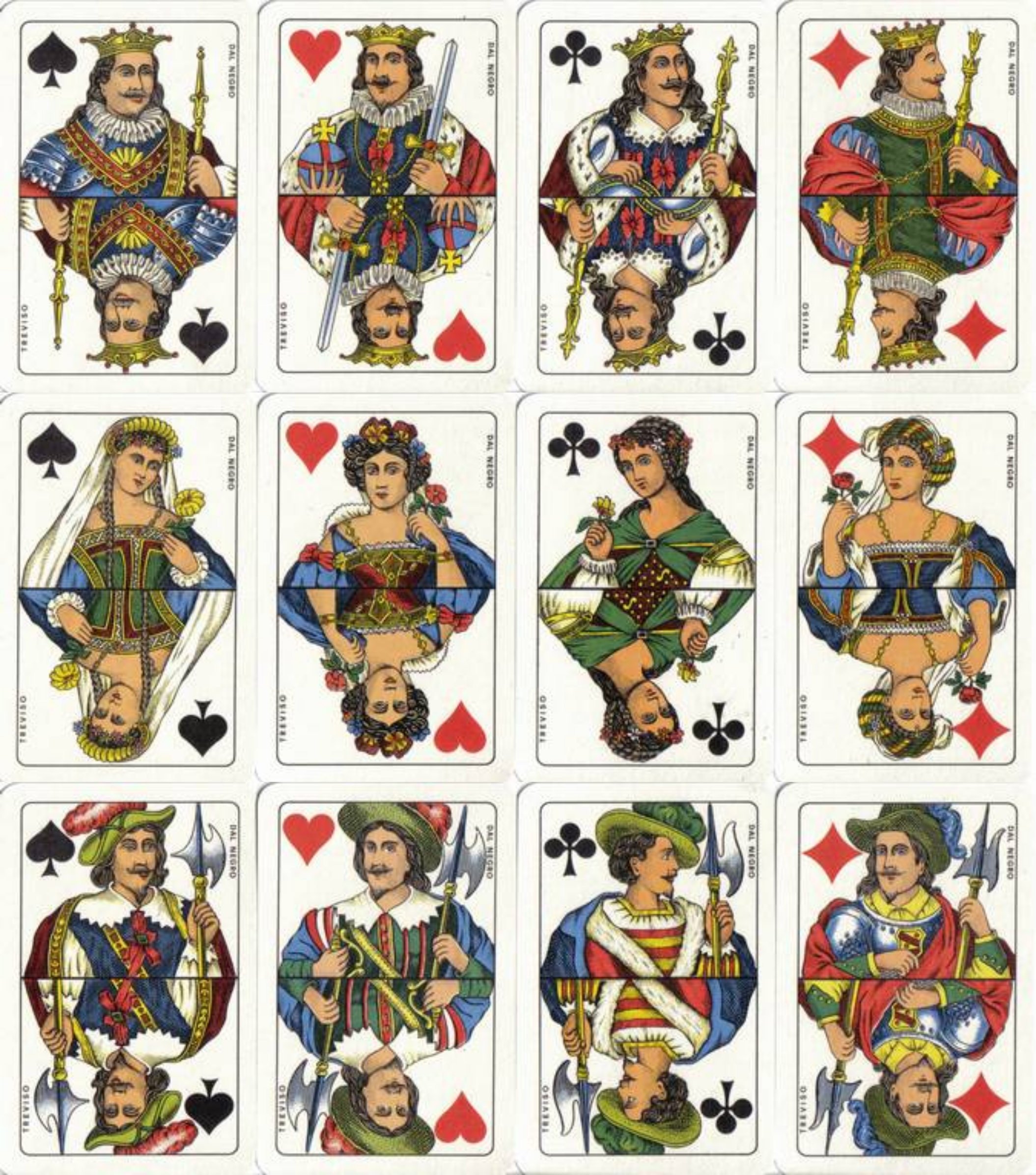
Carte Nuoresi's face cards

Originating from Nuoro, Nuoresi is a 40-card deck with horizontally mirrored face cards. Originally made by Solesio and later Dal Negro, which ceased around 1965. Distinctions include King of Hearts with a sword and a royal orb and the Jack of Diamonds and the King of Spades wearing armor. One hypothesis for the origin of this deck is these cards were brought to Sardinia in the late 19th century.

=== Industrie und Glück ===
Industrie und Glück is a deck used in Trieste and Trentino-Alto Adige/Südtirol for tarot card games. They originated in the Austro-Hungarian Empire, and are named for the German inscription on the second trump card.

== Spanish-suited decks ==
Spanish suits
Suits Neapolitan				
Suits Piacentine				
Suits Romagnole				
Suits Sicilian				
Suits Sardinian				
Suits Viterbese				
(Spain)	Espadas	Copas	Oros	Bastos
(Italy)	Spade	Coppe	Denari (Ori)	Bastoni (Mazze)
(United Kingdom)	Swords	Cups	Coins	Clubs

Spanish suits are used for the Napoletane, Sarde, Romagnole and Siciliane card patterns, which cover the southern half of the Italian peninsula and the islands of Sardinia and Sicily, and also the Piacentine deck from the northern city of Piacenza.

Spanish-suited cards differ from the Italian-suited northern decks in that clubs (bastoni) are depicted as cudgels, and the swords (spade) are straight longswords rather than curved scimitars.

=== Napoletane ===
Full set of cards in a Napoletane deck.

The Napoletane pattern is very widely used across southern and central Italy. It has a number of unique and characteristic cards, including the 3 of Clubs which features a grotesque mask with a large moustache, silhouettes of farming activities on the 5 of Swords, and the Horse/Cavalier (Cavallo) of Swords being portrayed as a Moor, wearing a turban and holding a scimitar.

The Ace of Coins features a double-headed eagle with two open circles; the lower circle was traditionally for the tax stamp.

=== Sarde ===
The Sardinian (Sarde) deck is the most similar in design to those used in Spain, due to the long cultural links of Spain and Sardinia, dating back to before Sardinia became part of Italy.

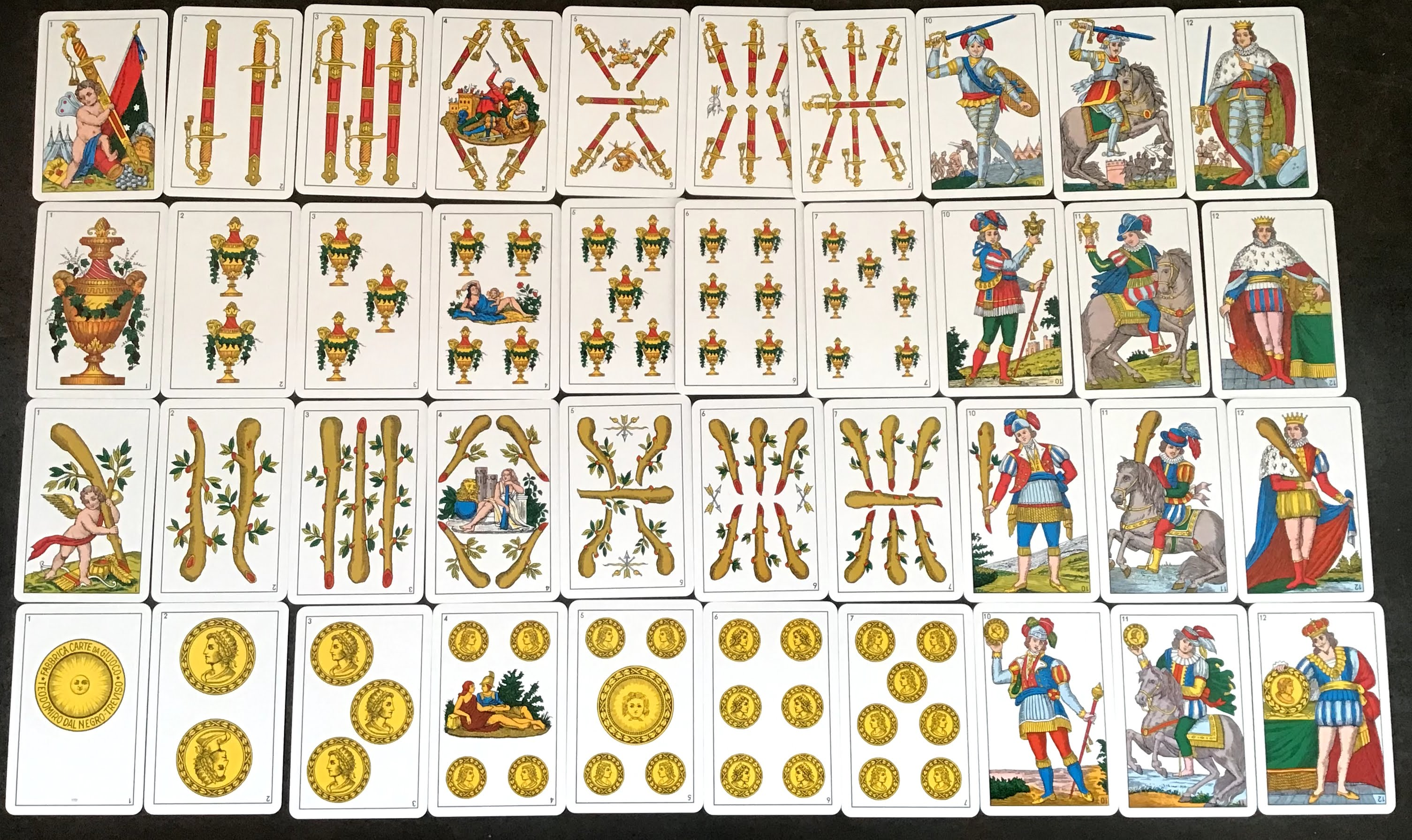
Sarde deck

Sardinian cards include tiny index numbers in the top left corners (as do cards in Spain), with the indices following the values on Spanish cards (Knave, Knight and King are marked 10, 11 and 12, as per a 48-card Spanish deck, even though the Sardinian deck only contains the standard Italian set of 40). The Ace of Coins is also the only regional Italian design to actually feature a large golden coin, with space for the tax stamp underneath, as opposed to an open circle in other Italian decks.

The names of the suits in the Sardinian language also show Spanish influence - whereas Cuppas, Bastos and Ispadas have the same meaning in Sardinian as in Italian, the suit of Coins is called Oros (meaning "golds", as the suit is called in Spanish) rather than Italian Denari. Similarly, the Knave is called Sutta (Sota in Spanish), as opposed to Italian Fante.

=== Piacentine ===
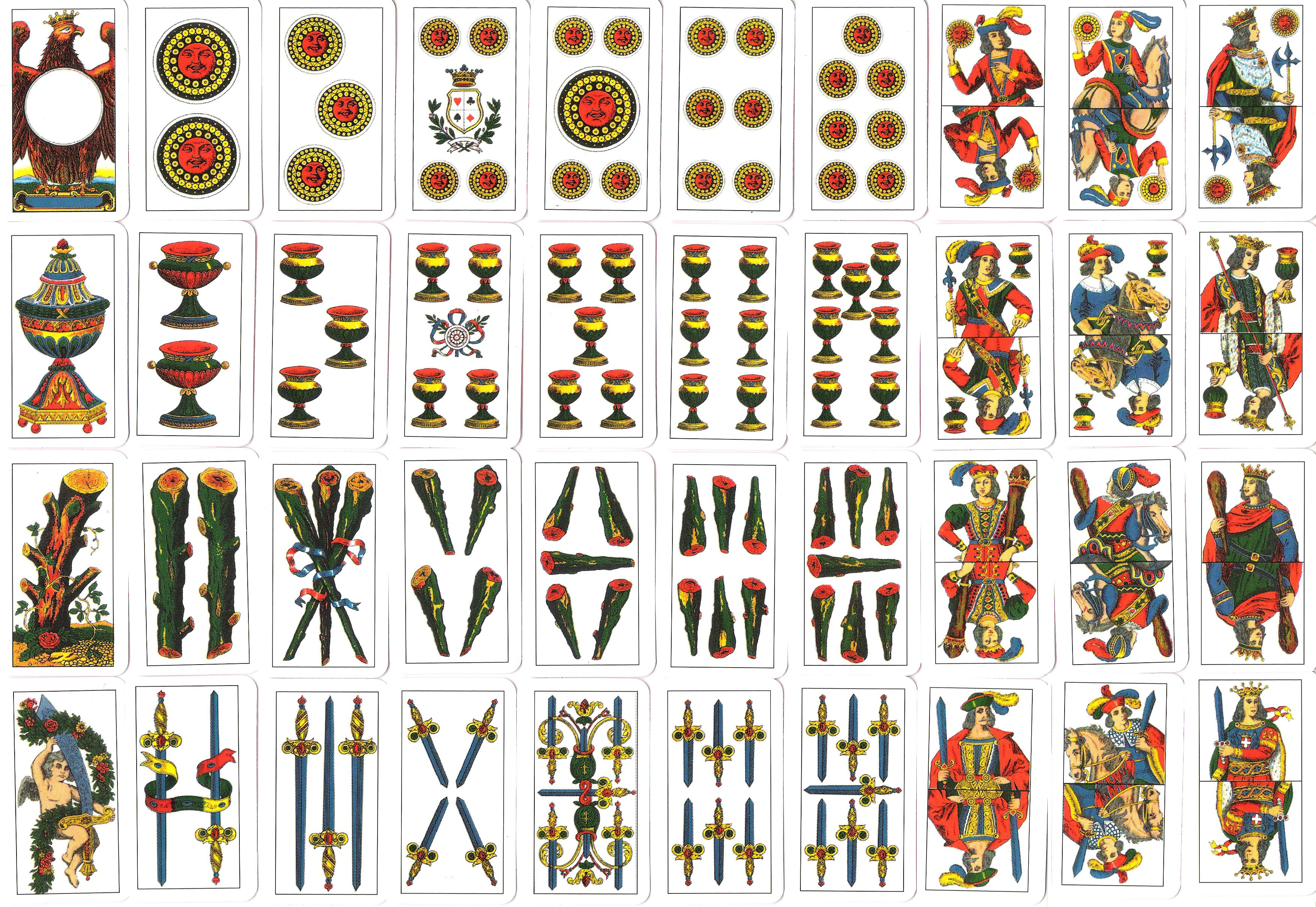
Full set cards in a Piacentine deck.

The Piacentine pattern is another Spanish-suited pack. The cards are long and narrow, typically measuring 50 mm × 94 mm (2 in × 3 1/2 in). Formerly single-headed, the court cards have usually been double-headed since the mid-20th century. The design is rather more ornate than the Neapolitan pattern. Distinctive features include the crowned eagle forming the background to the Ace of Coins, red faces in the centre of the coins themselves, the horse on the Cavalier of Clubs riding away from the viewer and the King of Coins brandishing an axe.

=== Viterbesi ===
Viterbesi deck
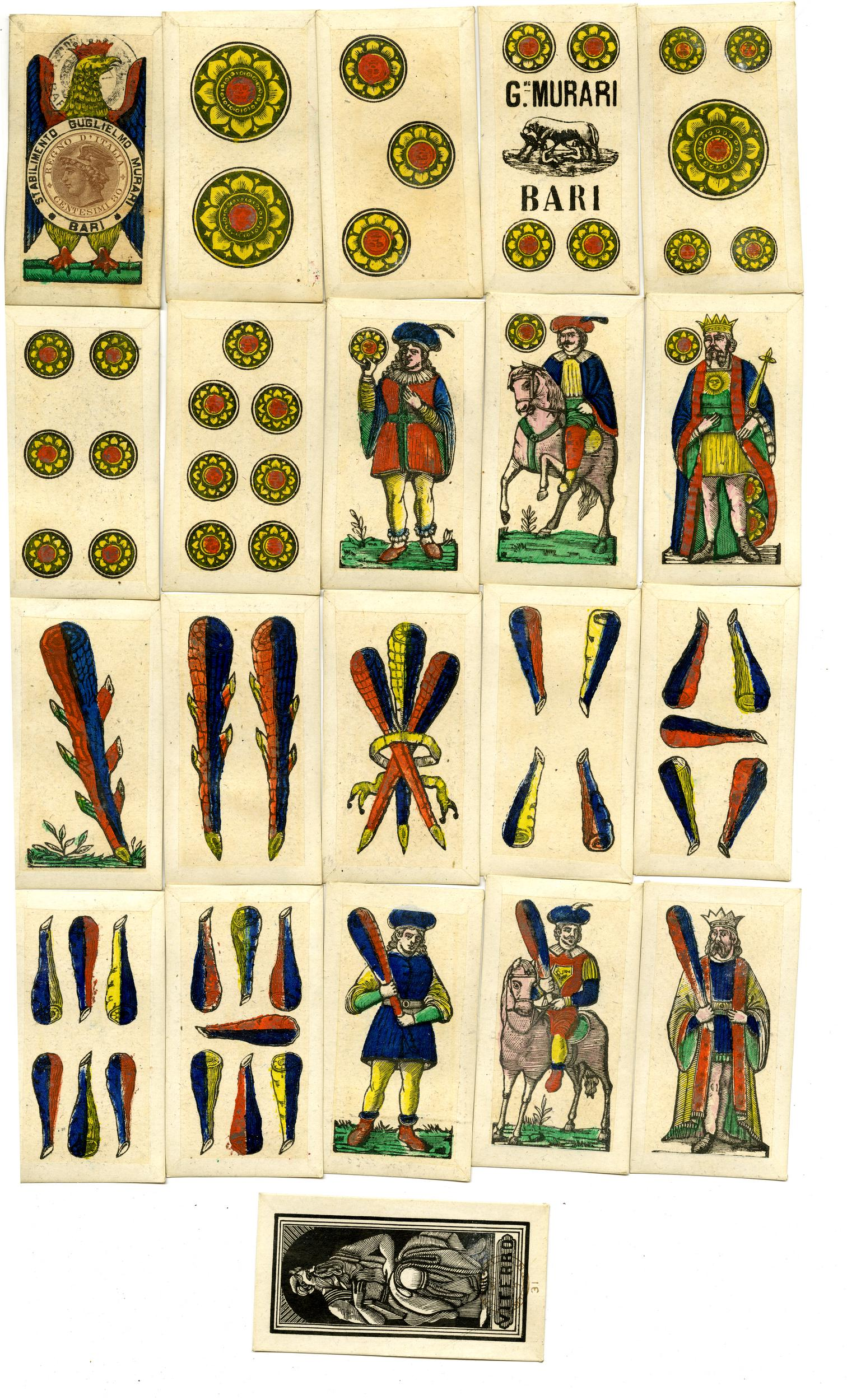
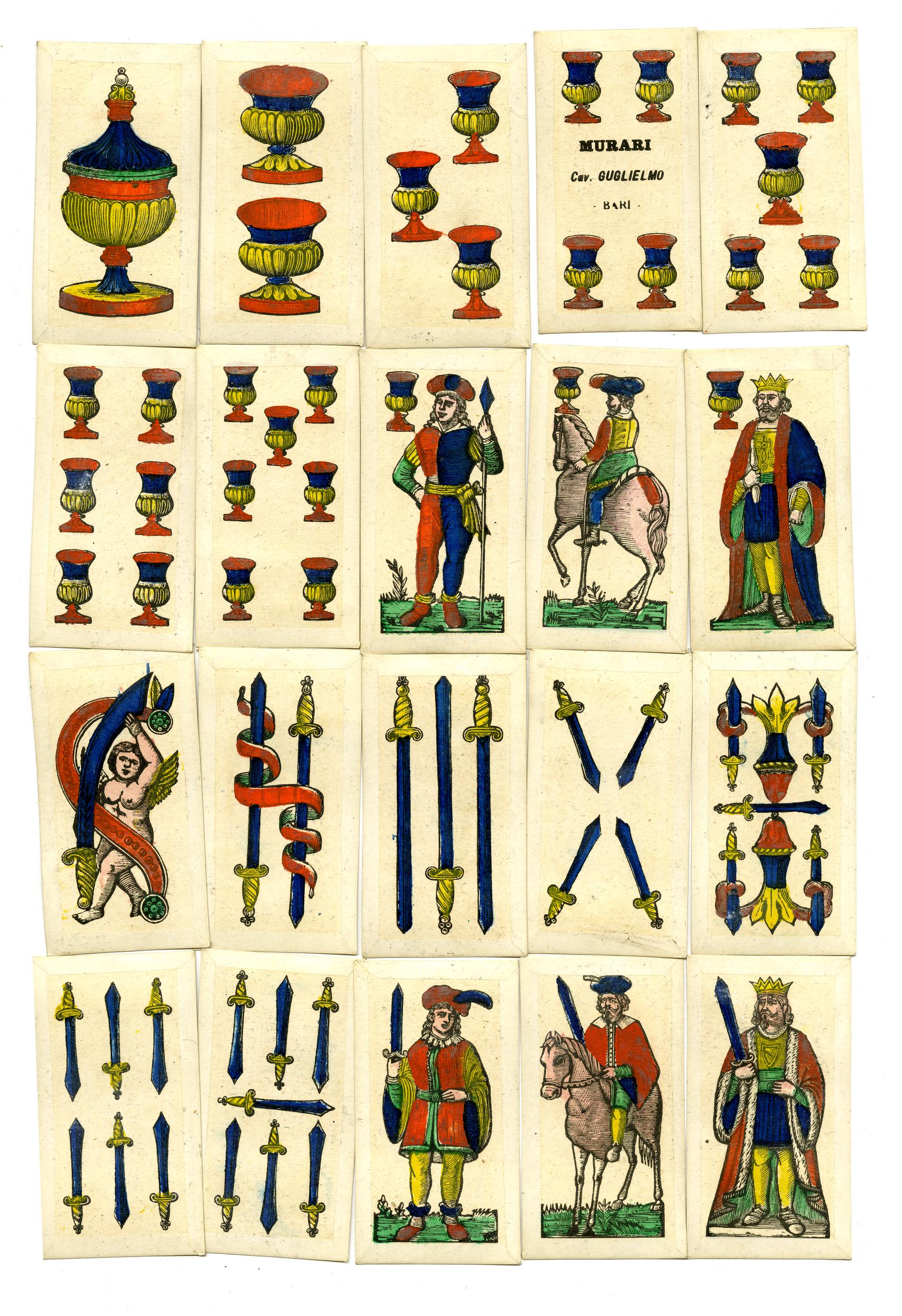

Now extinct, the Viterbesi pattern is a type of playing card from the city of Viterbo. The design is similar to the Piacentine and Romagnole pattern, with which they are confused with. Some similarities include the Ace of Swords looking like that of the Romagnole and the Ace of Coins is similar to Piacentine's, but the eagle has a lighter head, neck and legs than the rest of the body and have different color schemes. Some distinctions include all the knights and king cards facing left instead of right, certain sword cards have a drop point blade instead of strait. These cards measured 48 mm × 88 mm (2 in × 3 1/2 in).

== Portuguese suits ==
The Tarocco Siciliano is a deck used for playing Tarot card games, being unique in that is retains the otherwise extinct Portuguese variant of the Spanish suits.

== German-suited decks ==
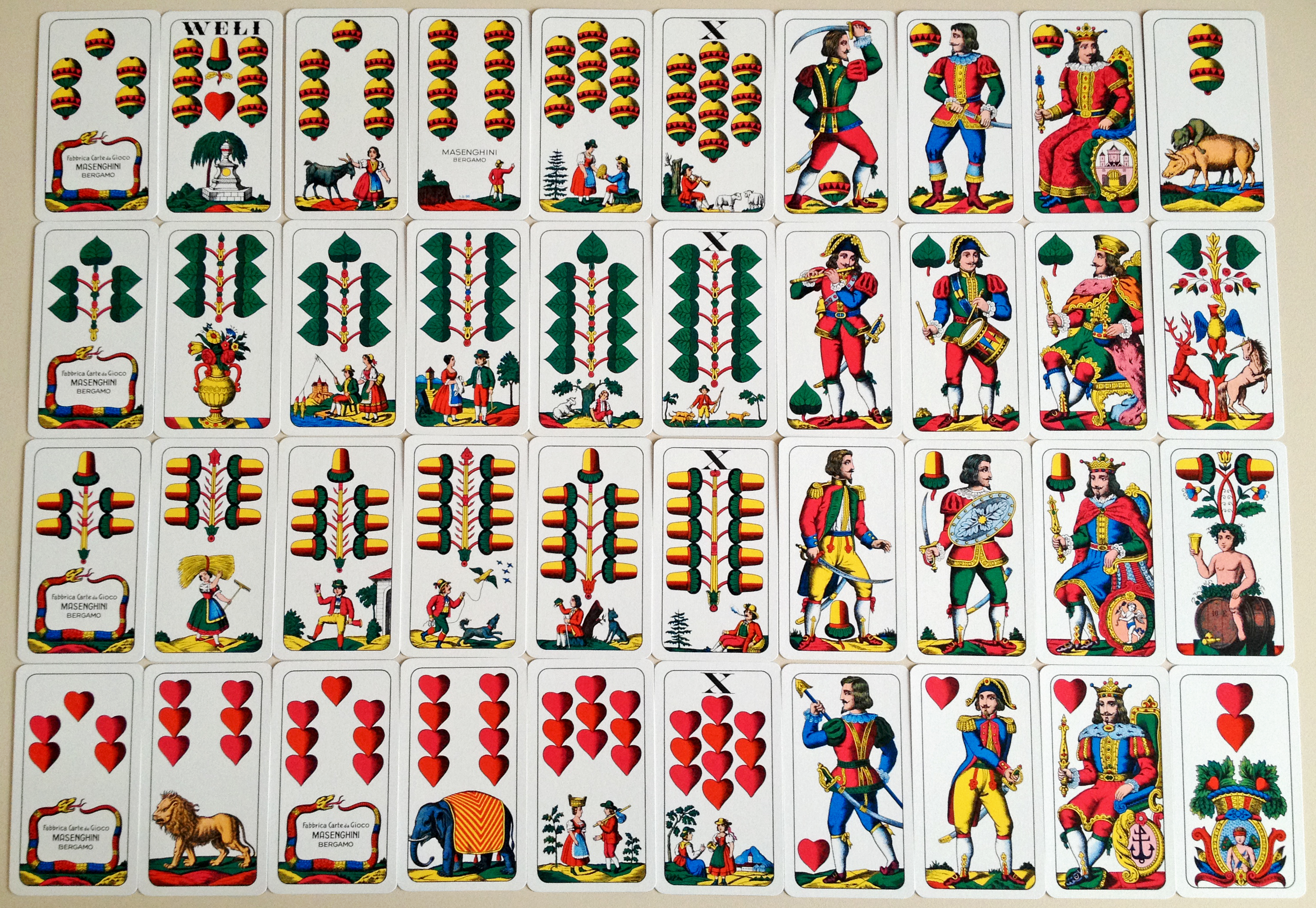
A Salzburg pattern pack of the type used in Northern Italy

German suits
Suits				
(Italy)	Ghiande	Foglie	Cuori	Campanelli
(Germany)	Eichel	Blatt	Herz	Schellen
(United Kingdom)	Acorns	Leaves	Hearts	Bells

At the end of World War I, the German-speaking region of South Tyrol was transferred from Austria to Italy, but has retained German cultural links, including the traditional German card suits, known in German as the Salzburger pattern, or in Italian as Salisburghesi after the city of Salzburg.

The Salisburghesi deck originally consisted of 33 cards, being the 32 cards used for Tyrolean games such as Watten and Bieten (each suit including an Ace (or Deuce), King, Upper Knave, Lower Knave, 10, 9, 8 and 7) plus the Weli, a wild card or joker equivalent. This has since been increased to 40 cards as per most other Italian decks, by adding a 6 and 5 to each suit, with the Weli doubling as the 6 of Bells.

== See also ==
- Trappola
- Tarot of Marseilles
- Tarot of Besançon
- Minchiate, extinct deck with mix Italian/Portuguese suits
- Ganjifa

== Literature ==
- Beal, George (1975). Playing Cards and their Story. Newton Abbot, London, Vancouver: David & Charles.
