= Marjapussi =

Traditional Finnish trick taking game

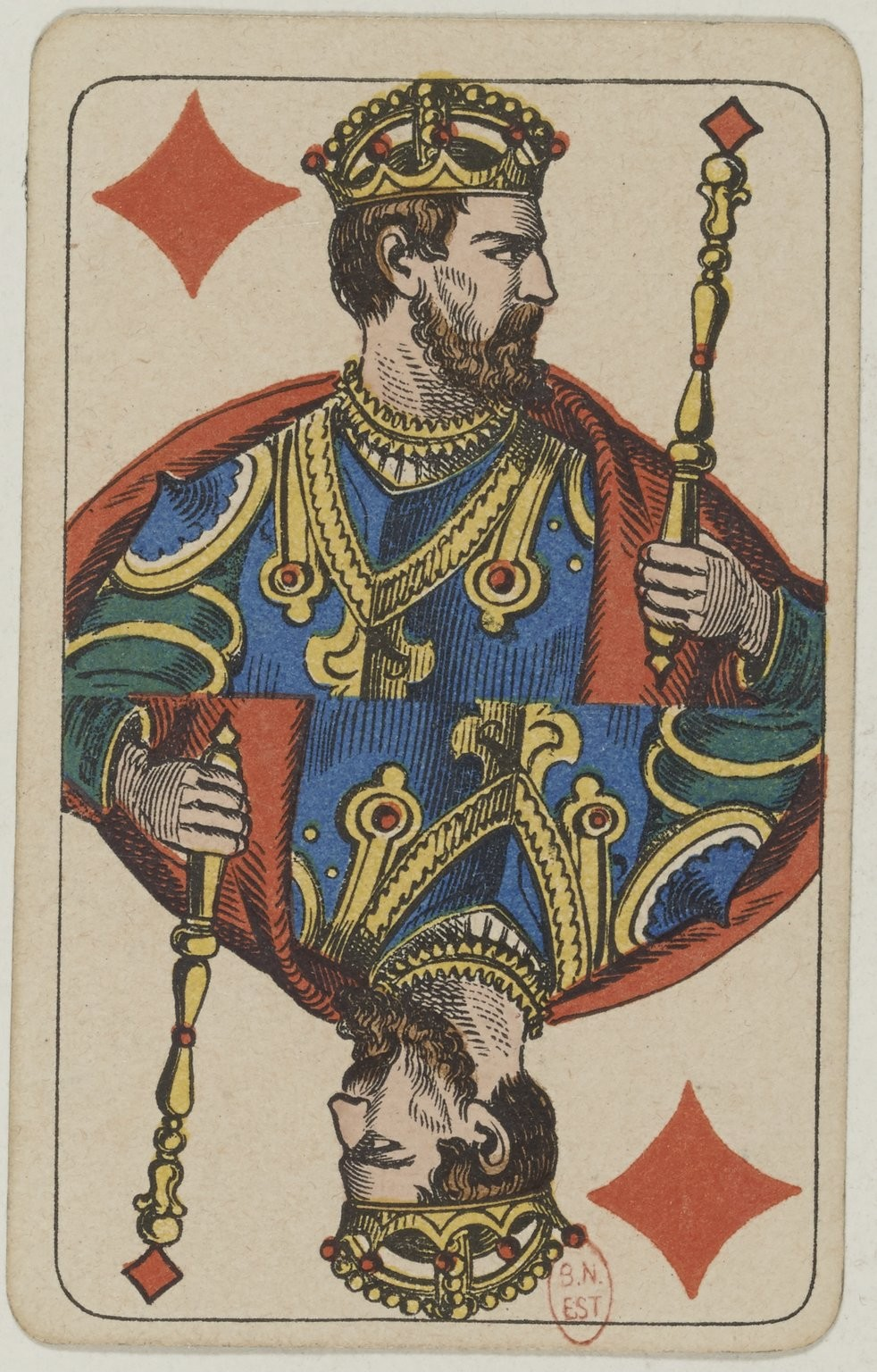
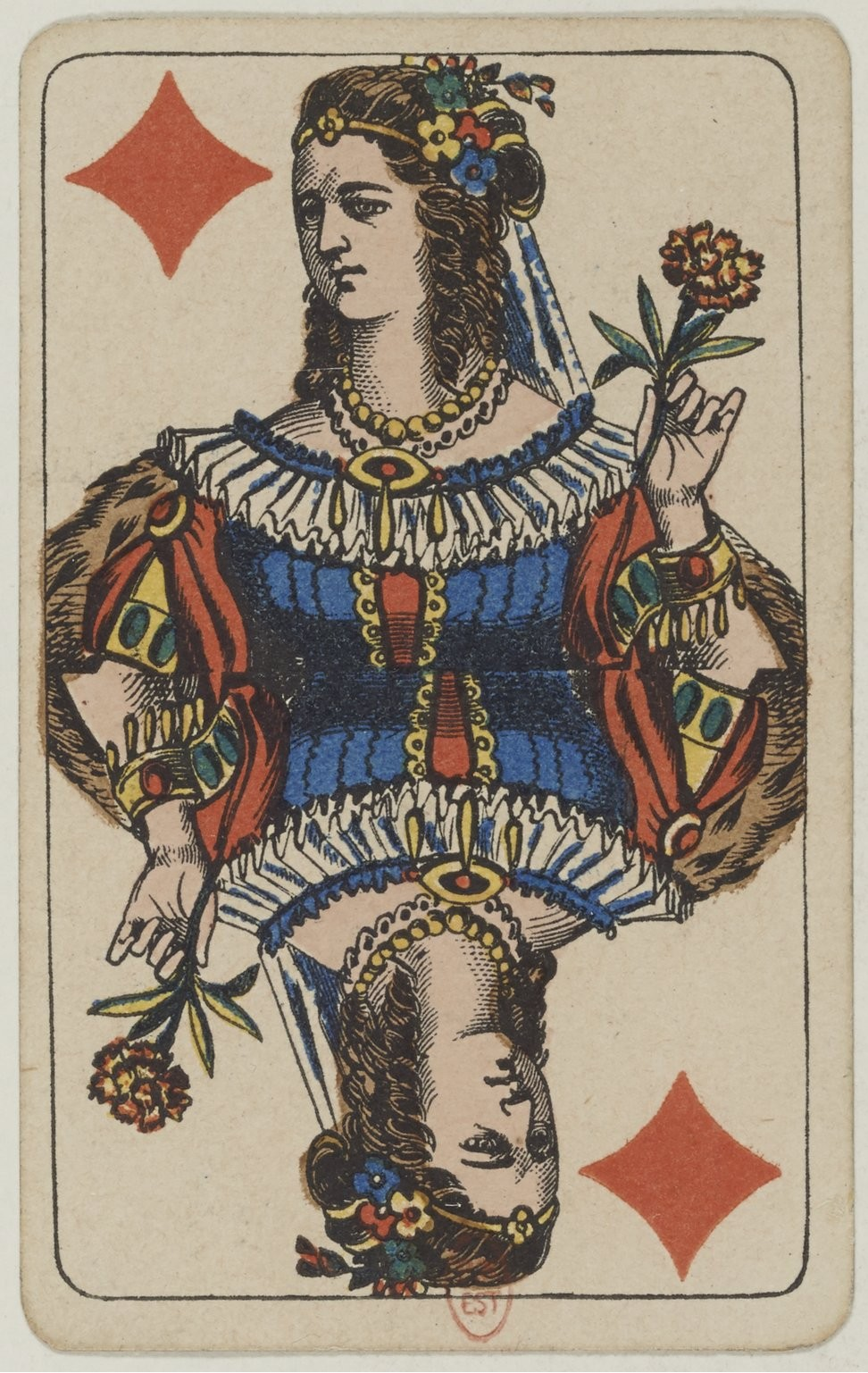
- A 'marriage'
- Origin: Finland
- Type: Trick-taking
- Players: 4
- Cards: 36 (24-36 in variants)
- Deck: French
- Rank (high→low): A 10 K Q J 9 8 7 6
- Play: Clockwise

Related games
- Mariage • Bondtolva • Huutopussi

Marjapussi is a traditional Finnish trick taking game for 4 players playing in 2 partnerships and is one of the Mariage family, its key feature being that the trump suit is determined in the middle of the play by declaring a marriage (a king and a queen of a same suit). There are variants of marjapussi for two and three players.

== Origin ==
Marjapussi is Finnish for 'bag of berries', but is derived from the French mariage which is the name of the game ancestral to it in which a 'marriage' is a king/queen combination held by one of the players. According to Kokko, the game was originally Spanish, although Mariage itself, despite its French name, appears to be a 17th-century German game.

Later, marjapussi evolved into huutopussi ("auction bag"), which involves bidding and contracts. The exact winning condition was dropped, but the trump determining process remained. In fact, in huutopussi the trump suit may even change in the middle of the play if players declare further marriages.

== Rules ==
Marjapussi is a trick taking game for four players in fixed partnerships with the partners sitting opposite one another.

=== Cards ===
Marjapussi is played with a pack of 36 French-suited Finnish pattern cards. This may be replicated by removing the 2s, 3s, 4s, and 5s from a standard 52-card pack. Cards rank in the usual ace–ten order: A > 10 > K > Q > J > 9 > 8 > 7 > 6. The aces and tens are called 'checkmaters' (mateiksi) and play a key role in scoring points.

=== Deal ===
The first dealer may be chosen by any method. After the first deal, the player who was forehand in the previous hand deals. The dealer gives an equal number of cards to each player.

=== Play ===
In the first deal, forehand, the player who leads to the first trick, is either the one who has the ♣A or is the player to the left of the dealer.

Forehand leads to the first trick and then, clockwise and in turn, each player plays a card to the table. A trick is formed when each player has played one card on the table. Players must follow suit if possible. Once a trump is determined, players who cannot follow, must play a trump if able. Players must always head the trick if possible, even if their partner has played the best card so far. The trick is taken by the person who played the highest trump or by the highest card of the led suit if no trumps are played and that person leads to the next trick. The tricks are collected face down in front of the player separately from the cards in the hand. The game continues until everyone runs out of cards and points are counted. After this, a new deal is started.

=== Marriages and trumps ===
A deal always starts as a no trump game, but a suit can be declared trumps during a hand. A player who has won a trick may declare trumps if a 'marriage', i.e. king and a queen of the same suit, is held. There are three options:

- A player with a marriage in hand may declare that suit as trumps.
- A player may ask if the partner has a 'whole' i.e. a marriage in hand by saying e.g. "do you have a whole marriage?" If yes, that suit becomes trumps. The asker may not nominate a suit when asking.
- A player with a king or a queen in hand may ask if the partner has "a half" of that suit, that is the other card of the pair in his hand by saying e.g. "do you have a half-marriage in spades?" If yes, that suit becomes trumps. The asker specifies the suit, but not the denomination.

After each trick, the winner of the trick is entitled to one of the actions mentioned above. Once trumps have been declared:

- The trump suit may not be changed by further marriage declarations.
- The declaring team may subsequently ask for half-marriages but not whole ones.
- Players may declare 'little ones' or 'little trumps', i.e. other marriages in a similar fashion, but they only affect scoring and do not change the trump suit.

Each suit can be declared only once during a hand.

=== Scoring ===
Counting pips in tricks
Rank	A	10	K	Q	J	9	8	7	6
Pips	11	10	4	3	2	0	0	0	0

Game points are scored as follows:

- Trump (Valtti): 2 points for declaring trumps.
- Litte Trump (Pikkuvaltti) 1 point for each 'little marriage'
- Last (Viimeinen): 1 point for winning the last trick
- Victory (Voitto): 1 point for the team that has more card points in tricks (see table)

The card points are counted after all cards have been played. Game is 10 or 12 game points. To win, a team must score exactly 12. If they get more, they go back down to 7 game points. If a team takes no tricks in a deal, they lose all their points so far. This is sometimes called 'going to Porvoo'.

== Avomarjapussi ==
This two-handed variant of marjapussi is known as avomarjapussi ("open marjapussi"). Each player is dealt four hand cards, followed by a row of seven downcards on the table and a row of seven upcards on the top of the downcards. To declare marriages and play cards to tricks, the players can use both their own upcards and hand cards. When a player plays an upcard to a trick and there is a downcard beneath it, the latter is turned face up.

Other rules are the same as the four-handed game, except that there are no partnerships, and consequently the rules on asking a partner for a whole or a half do not apply.

== Related games ==
A very similar game evidently related to Sixty-six, but with a curious resonance of All Fours is played in Sweden under the name Bondtolva ("Farmer's Dozen").

== Literature ==
- Kokko, Petri (1999). Pelien parhaat, WSOY (rules of avomarjapussi).
- Kurki-Suonio, Ilmo (1962). MMM Korttipelikirja, Otava.
- Parlett, David (1996). Oxford Dictionary of Card Games, Oxford: Oxford University Press.ISBN 0-19-869173-4
- Parlett, David (2008). Penguin Book of Card Games, Oxford: Oxford University Press. (mention only)
- Ranta, Pekka (1993). Marjapussissa Porvooseen. Porvoo: WSOY.
- Sandgren, Tore (2003). Pelataan korttia. WS Bookwell OY.
