= Ace–ten game =

Type of card game in which the aces and tens are of particularly high value

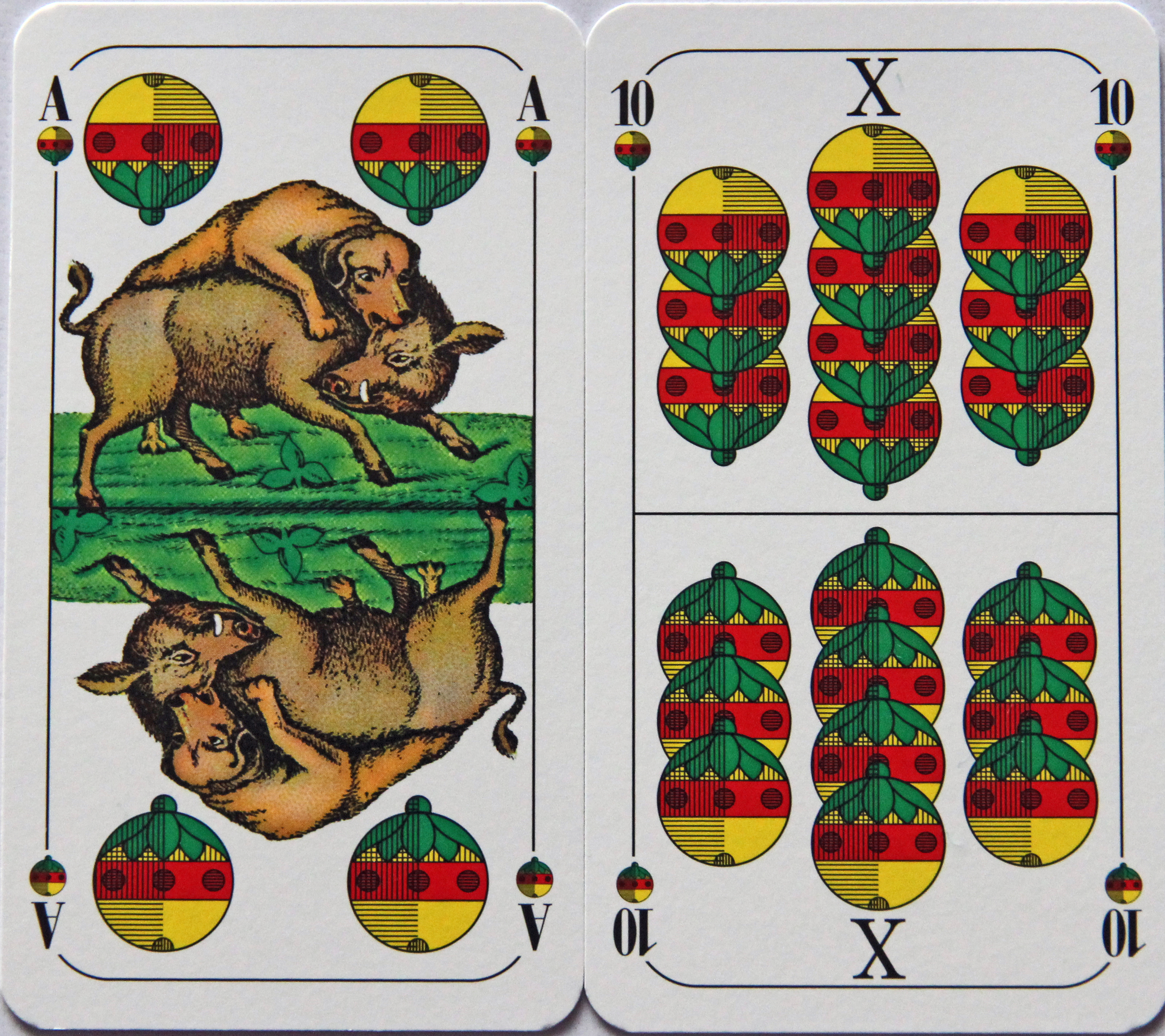
The ace (deuce) and ten of bells from a Bavarian pattern, German-suited pack

An ace–ten game is a type of card game, highly popular in Europe, in which the aces and tens are of particularly high value.

== Description ==
Many of Europe's most popular card games feature the ace–ten scoring system, where the cards count as ace = 11, ten = 10, king = 4, queen or Ober = 3, jack or Unter = 2. Pip cards below the ten generally have no card point value and the pack is often shortened by removing the lower pip cards or 'non-counters'. This means that, in a typical shortened pack of between 20 and 36 cards, there are 120 card points and thus a winning total is typically 61 points. Wins are doubled for scoring three-quarters of the total points and trebled for winning every trick, a scoring system known as the skat schedule after its "most illustrious" example, the German national game of skat.

There are three branches of the ace–ten family:

- Schafkopf group. The trump suit is bolstered by the promotion of each Unter (jack) or each Ober (queen) or both to be permanent top trumps.
- Marriage group. Bonuses are added for melding a 'marriage' or 'pair' composed of a king and queen or king and Ober of the same suit. In many cases, bonuses are awarded for other melds and for taking the last trick. (Note: In Schnapsen and Bavarian sixty-six, the last trick wins the game rather than a bonus)
- Jass group. The trump jack and trump nine are permanent top trumps, typically known as Jass and Nell. There are usually bonuses for various melds and taking the last trick.

The historical English game of losing lodam uses a similar scoring system, but the courts are worth one point less i.e. the king is three points, the queen two and the knave one.

== History ==
=== Point-trick games ===
Ace-ten games are a subset of point-trick games which go back a long way and may have been invented along with Tarot cards and trumps. Apart from that, the earliest known record of a point-trick game dates to 1522 when Rümpffen was described alongside, flussen, scherlentzen, karnyffeln and Bockenmendeln. The game is also mentioned in 1539 in a Fastnacht play. Other early examples include Trappola, which we know from Girolamo Cardano was current in Venice in 1524, and Triumph, which is described in England in 1586.

=== Emergence of ace–ten games ===
Although the origin of ace–ten games is uncertain, scholars have proposed a number of theories. In 1980, Sir Michael Dummett argued that they were most likely to have been invented by users of French cards in the Netherlands area, a hypothesis supported by the Dutch origin of the Swiss national game of Jass. In 2000, John McLeod wrote that we can trace their development "from Brisque and Mariage in the 16th century along various paths to produce 66 and Tyziacha, Maria Ulti, Schafkopf, Doppelkopf and Skat, as well as the Jass games."

The earliest record of any ace–ten game, surprising, is for the old English game of losing lodam, which dates to at least 1591, is the earliest known game with an ace–ten scoring system. However, its scoring and ranking system (A 11, K 3, Q 2, J 1, T 10, rest 0) are those of early Dutch Jass, with the exception of the promotion of the Jack and 9 in trumps; thus it may be of Dutch origin. Despite unfounded claims for the invention of 66 at Paderborn in 1652, it is not recorded until 1715 although Kozietulski stated in 1888 that it had been popular in Poland for two centuries which dates its appearance there to the late 17th century and he doubts it is of Polish origin on account of its French name and the marriage feature which appears in old French games.

The earliest recorded rules for a game with a form of ace–ten scheme date to around 1672 when Willughby published the only known description of losing lodam, a negative game in which the aim was not to collect cards with penalty points. However, losing lodam is mentioned as early as 1586 and may be the same as the game of coquinbert qui gagne perd (..."he who wins loses") listed by Rabelais in 1534. Another early example is the French game of Brusquembille whose rules appeared in 1718.

=== Promotion of the ten ===
Probably around 1820, the Ten began to be promoted from its natural position between the Jack and the Nine to take its place between the Ace and King. In Wendish Schafkopf and Doppelkopf this change does not appear, however, until as late as 1899. (Note: Cf. Anton (1889) Encyclopädia der Spiele 5th edn. Leipzig: Wigand, and Walther (1899) Das Schafkopfspiel. Leipzig: Siegbert Schnurpfeil.) So in most ace–ten games nowadays the Tens are high. A few games retain the natural ranking in which Tens are low, an indication that they are older:

- German Schafkopf
- Mariage
- Reunion
- Hindersche and Viersche
- Loosing Loadum

== Games with national or regional status ==
Many ace–ten games have achieved national or regional status. They are usually played with cards typical of their particular country or region. These include:

- Belote, France's national card game, very similar to Dutch Klaberjass (see below)
- Binokel, Württemberg's national card game
- Briscola, one of Italy's most popular games
- Jass, Switzerland's national game
- Klaberjass, the Dutch invented "international, classic two-hander"
- Mariáš, Czechoslovakia's national game
- Pinochle, US, an "American classic"
- Schafkopf, Bavaria's national game
- Schnapsen, Austria's national game
- Skat, Germany's national game
- Sueca, Portugal's most famous card game
- Tute, Spain's national game
- Zole, Latvia's national game

== Other ace–ten games ==
Other well-known ace–ten games include:

- Bezique, "one of the most illustrious games of European high society"
- Brusquembille, rules first recorded in 1718.
- Doppelkopf, Northern Germany
- Einwerfen, an early ancestor of ace–ten games
- Losing lodam, with the earliest recorded rules of an ace–ten system (1672).
- Mariage, oldest known game of the Marriage family of ace–ten games
- Russian schnapsen or 1000, a 24-card variant played in Russia
- Six-bid, modern American game derived from Tarock
- Sixty-six, Bavaria, Germany
- Tarock, Germany

== See also ==
- Marriage group
- Jack–nine games

== Bibliography ==
- Dummett, Michael (1980). The Game of Tarot. London: Duckworth. ISBN 0-7156-1014-7.
- Florio, John (1591). Second Frutes. London: Woodcock.
- Kozietulski, Stanislaw [under the pseudonym Stary Gracz] (1888). Gry y Karty. Warsaw: Synow or Orgelbrand.
- McLeod, John (May–June 2000). "Playing the Game: Jass Games–a survey". The Playing-Card. Vol. 28, no. 6. ISSN 0305-2133.
- Parlett, David (1991). A History of Card Games. Oxford: OUP. ISBN 0-19-282905-X.
- Parlett, David (2008). The Penguin Book of Card Games. London: Penguin. ISBN 978-0-141-03787-5.
- Rabelais, François (1894) [1635]. "1.XXII.—The games of Gargantua". Gargantua and Pantagruel. Translated by Sir Thomas Urquhart. Illustrated by Gustave Doré. Derby: Moray Press.
- Tompa, Martin (2015). Winning Schnapsen. ISBN 978-1515377368.
- Willughby, Francis (2003) [1665]. David Cram; Jeffrey L. Forgeng (eds.). A Volume of Plaies (ms.) - published as Francis Willughby's Book of Games: A Seventeenth- Century Treatise on Sports, Games, and Pastimes. Oxford: Routledge. ISBN 978-1-85928-460-5.
