= 1000 (card game) =

Card game for two or three players

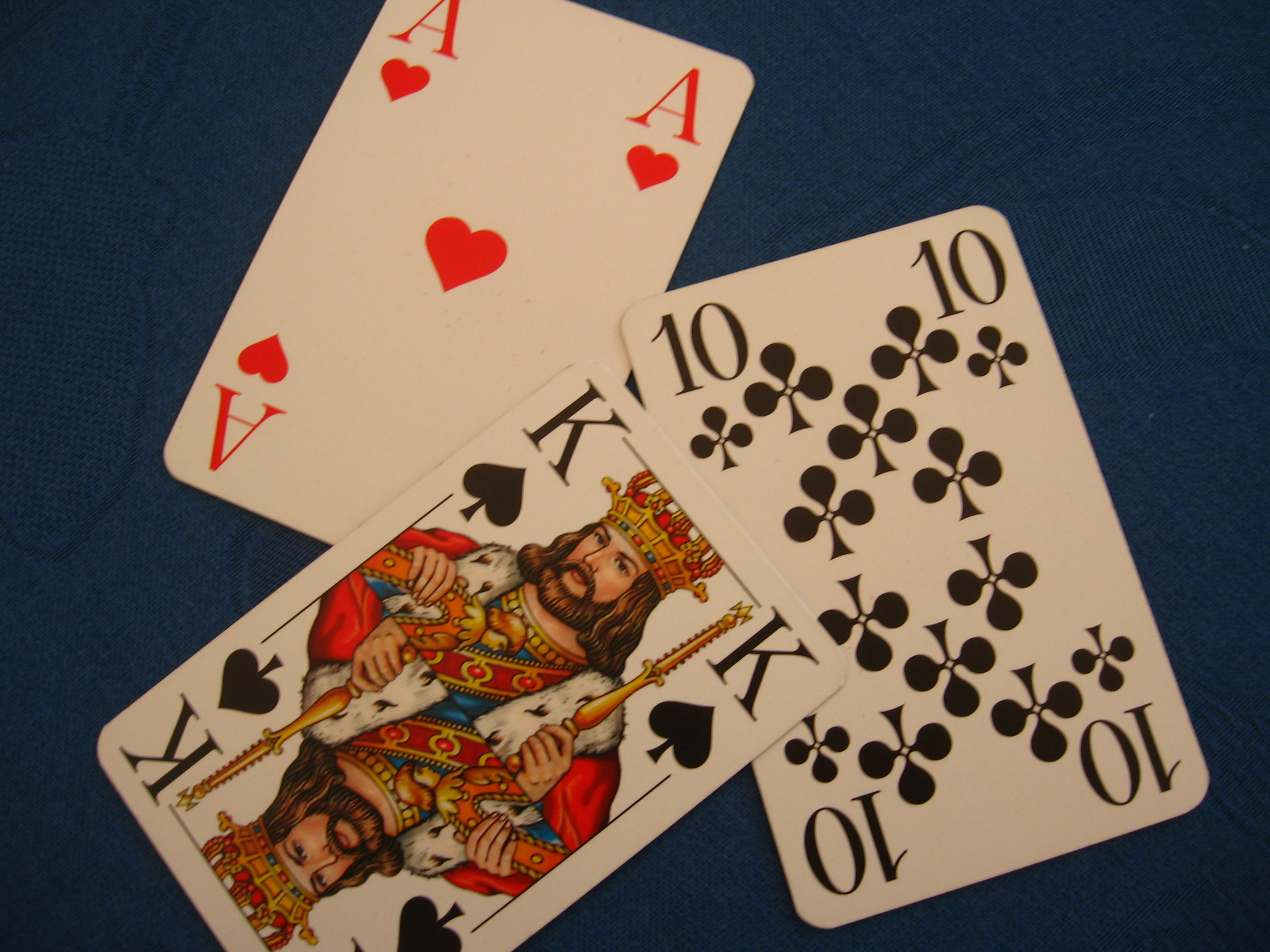
- French-pattern Skat cards used in 1000
- Origin: Likely Russia, alternatively Poland or Ukraine
- Type: Trick-taking
- Players: 3
- Cards: 24
- Deck: French
- Rank (high→low): A 10 K Q J 9
- Play: Clockwise

Related games
- Sixty-six • 1001

1000 is an easy-to-learn card game for two or three players. Its simple rules make it suitable for players to quickly become familiar with the basic concepts of trick-taking and trump-based card games. The name is taken from the score at the end of the game.

== Outline ==
The game is for three players and a 24-card deck of French playing cards, cards ranking in descending order in each suit as follows: A 10 K Q J and 9. Note that the 10s are promoted to second place. If a Skat deck is used, the 7s and 8s are removed. The three-hand rules will be described here.

== Aim ==
The aim is to be the first to reach 1001 points. With the simpler scoring system, it is enough to reach 1000 points.

== Starting ==
The dealer is drawn by lot and deals two packets of three cards and one packet of two cards in turn in a clockwise direction beginning with forehand (to the left of the dealer). Each player thus receives a hand of 8 cards. Forehand leads to the first trick. At the beginning there is no trump suit, i.e. the highest card of the led suit wins the trick and the winner of the trick leads to the next trick.

== Trumps and melds ==
To declare a suit as trumps, the player, whose turn it is, has to meld a pair consisting of a King and Queen of the same suit. Unless this suit becomes trumps, this scores points as follows:

Diamonds 80 points,
Hearts 100 Points,
Spades 40 points,
Clubs 60 Points.

However, the melder must then play either the Queen or the King from the meld to the trick. The same player or another player can then meld another, but higher, pair for another trick. The trump suit changes again after this meld. This means that the K–Q of Clubs can always be melded, but the K–Q of Diamonds can only be melded as the very first meld of the game.

When a trump is played, it will of course beat any plain suit cards, but there is no compulsion to play trumps if a card of the led suit is not held.

== Scoring ==
In the simplified scoring system, points are scored as follows:

Ace 11 points,
Tens 10 points,
King 4 points,
Queen 3 points,
Jack 2 points.

So there are 120 points to win, plus bonuses for the melds. There are two scoring systems:

- Simplified scoring. In the simple system, points are divided by ten, with a five being rounded up. Game is 100.
- Original scoring. If the original system is used, all points are counted and the first player to score 1,001 points wins, hence the name.

== Four players ==
When playing with four, the rules are exactly the same, except that eights and sevens are now also added.

== Variation ==
=== Jungfrau ===
A player that has not taken a trick by the end of a round becomes a Jungfrau ("virgin") and receives 100 (or 10) additional points.

== 1001 with Bidding ==
This common variant makes it more like Skat, as it also introduces the principle of bidding to the players. Due to the additional rules, the game is more complex.

The variant "1001 with Bidding" introduces the following changes:

- In general, the full Skat deck is used; except that, in a four-player game, the two red sevens are taken out.
- Two cards are dealt to the stock, pott or skat. These cards will go to the highest bidder.
- After the deal, bidding begins with the player to the left of the dealer. In ascending order, players bid the number of points they think they will score. If a player does not want to overbid further, he or she announces this. Once all other players have dropped out of the bidding, the highest bidder picks up the skat. Two cards must be discarded by him before the game begins. These cards count as his at the end of the round. The highest bidder plays.
- If a player does not reach the bid score, this score is deducted from his points.
- If the declarer forgets to discard, the hands are thrown in. The declarer has 120 points deducted and 120 points are divided among the remaining players.
- A meld only counts if the melder has taken a trick.
- Melds are always possible regardless of their value, i.e. first the 100 and then the 40, but once a player has over 900 points this player is no longer allowed to meld.

== Tips ==
It is better to play the Queen than the King, as this card is often lost and the Queen is worth one point less.

If you have two pairs to meld, the question is always whether to meld only the higher pair or whether to take the points for melding both pairs. But then you run the risk of not being able to meld the second couple, if you are forced to play the Queen or King when melding. The owner of the Ace or Ten in this suit, then leads to the next trick and may have a meld himself. So you have to weigh up, if you have a good hand in the lower suit, or if you have more Aces, you should start with the lower meld.

== See also ==
- Russian Schnapsen
- 1000 (Тысяча)

== Literature ==
- Braun, Franz (1966). Spielkarten und Kartenspiele. Hanover: Fackelträger.
- Hülsemann, Robert (1930). Das Buch der Spiele für Familie und Gesellschaft. Leipzig: Hesse & Becker.
