= Schnapsen =

Card game

- Austria's national card game
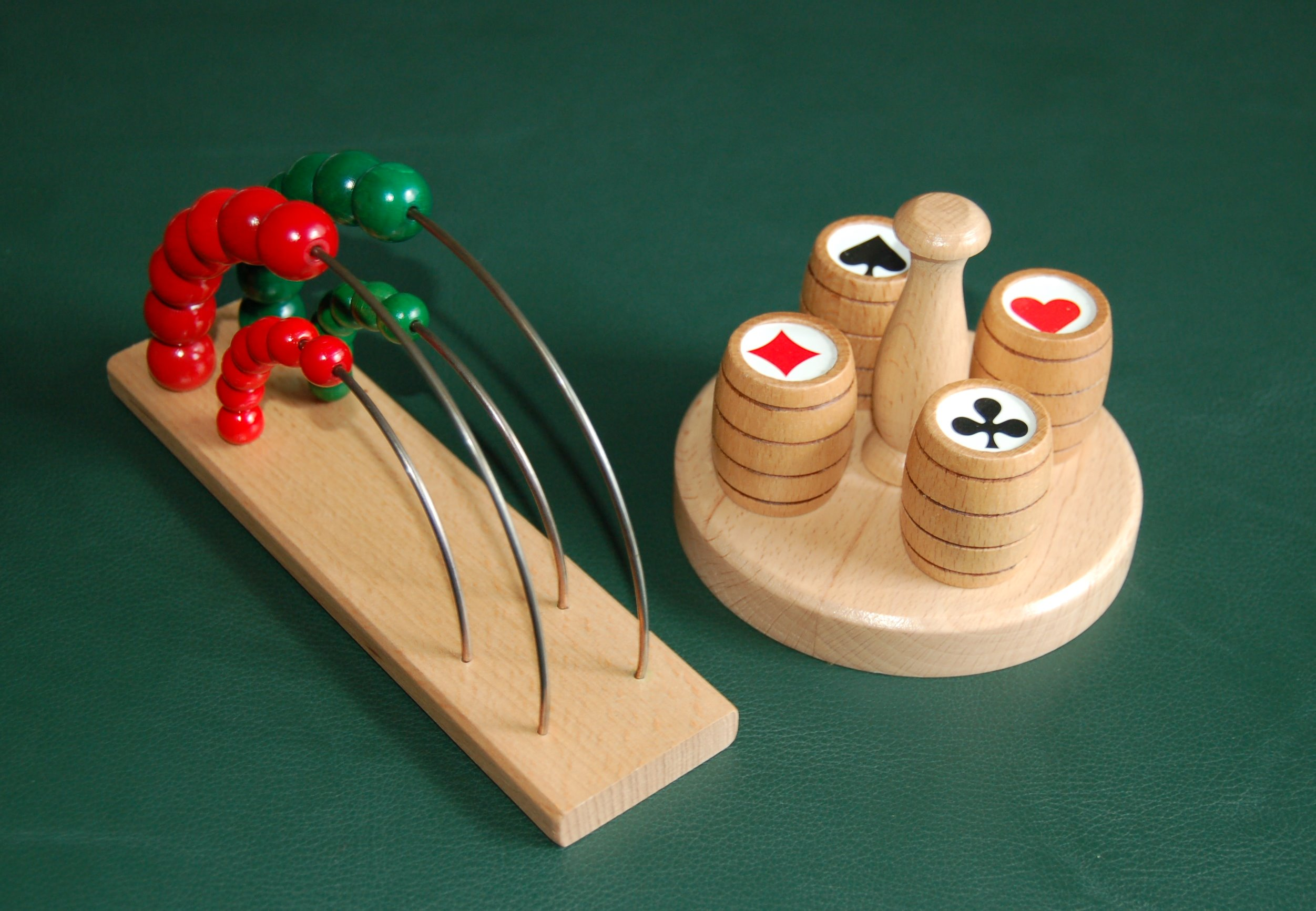
- Accessories for keeping score in Schnapsen
- Origin: Austria
- Type: Point-trick
- Players: 2
- Cards: 20
- Deck: French or William Tell
- Rank (high→low): A 10 K Q J
- Play: Alternate
- Playing time: 1 min/hand, 5-10 min/round

Related games
- Mariage, 66, Russian Schnapsen, Mariáš

Schnapsen, Schnapser or Schnapsa is a trick-taking card game of the bézique (ace–ten) family that is very popular in Bavaria and in the territories of the former Austro-Hungarian Empire and has become the national card game of Austria and Hungary. Schnapsen is both of the point-trick (individual cards in each trick are used to determine points as in Pinochle) and trick-and-draw (a new card is drawn after each trick is won) subtypes.

The game is similar to sixty-six (Sechsundsechzig). Many rule variations exist, and both Schnapsen and sixty-six involve challenging strategy. Schnapsen has been described as "an inherently intense game that requires a lot of concentration and so isn't good for socializing, but it's a challenging game whose interest never wavers."

== Etymology and origins ==
The name Schnapsen (Hungarian: Snapszer) may be derived from schnappen, which means "to trump". The most prevalent theory in popular tradition is that the game is so named because people often played it for drinks, particularly schnaps. Schnapsen is descended from Mariage, the earliest description of which is found in the Leipziger Frauenzimmer-Lexicon of 1715. Mariage, a 32-card game, is still commonly played today in Czechia where it is called Mariáš.

The earliest reference to Schnapsen itself may be the following quotation attributed to Professor Galletti (1750–1828), who informed his pupils at the Gotha Grammar School (Gymnasium Gotha) that:

Ihr denkt wohl, Geschichte ist so leicht als Schnarps? Ach, Geschichte kann man in einer Stunde lernen, aber an Schnarps muß man mehrere Jahre studiren. ("So you really think that history is as easy as Schnaps? Ach, you can learn history in an hour, but you must study Schnaps for many years."

Early Schnapsen rules are recorded by Unger c. 1920.

== Rules ==
=== Aim ===
The aim of the game is to win 7 points over the course of a few hands. Typically this is a countdown, with players "starting with" 7 points and trying to get down to 0.

The points awarded at the end of a hand usually depend on values of cards played in the hand, also called "points". These two are sometimes distinguished as "game points" and "card points" respectively; in German the "card points" are often called Augen ("eyes").

1-3 game points are awarded at the end of a hand, and can be won in one of four ways:

- taking 66 card points' worth of tricks and marriages and announcing it before one's opponent (1-3pts)
- catching one's opponent without 66 card points after they have announced them OR at the end of a hand in which they have closed the "talon" (deck) (2-3pts)
- winning the last possible trick after all the cards have run out and noone has closed the talon (depending on the version) (1pt)
- one's opponent misplaying after the talon has been closed or exhausted (3pts)

More game points are awarded at the end of a hand in which a player has closed the talon or claimed 66 based on how few card points the other player had at the time. Thus if one player is taking many more tricks than their opponent, they stand to win more game points by announcing 66 or closing the talon sooner, but stand to concede more points to their opponent if they miscalculate.

=== Cards ===
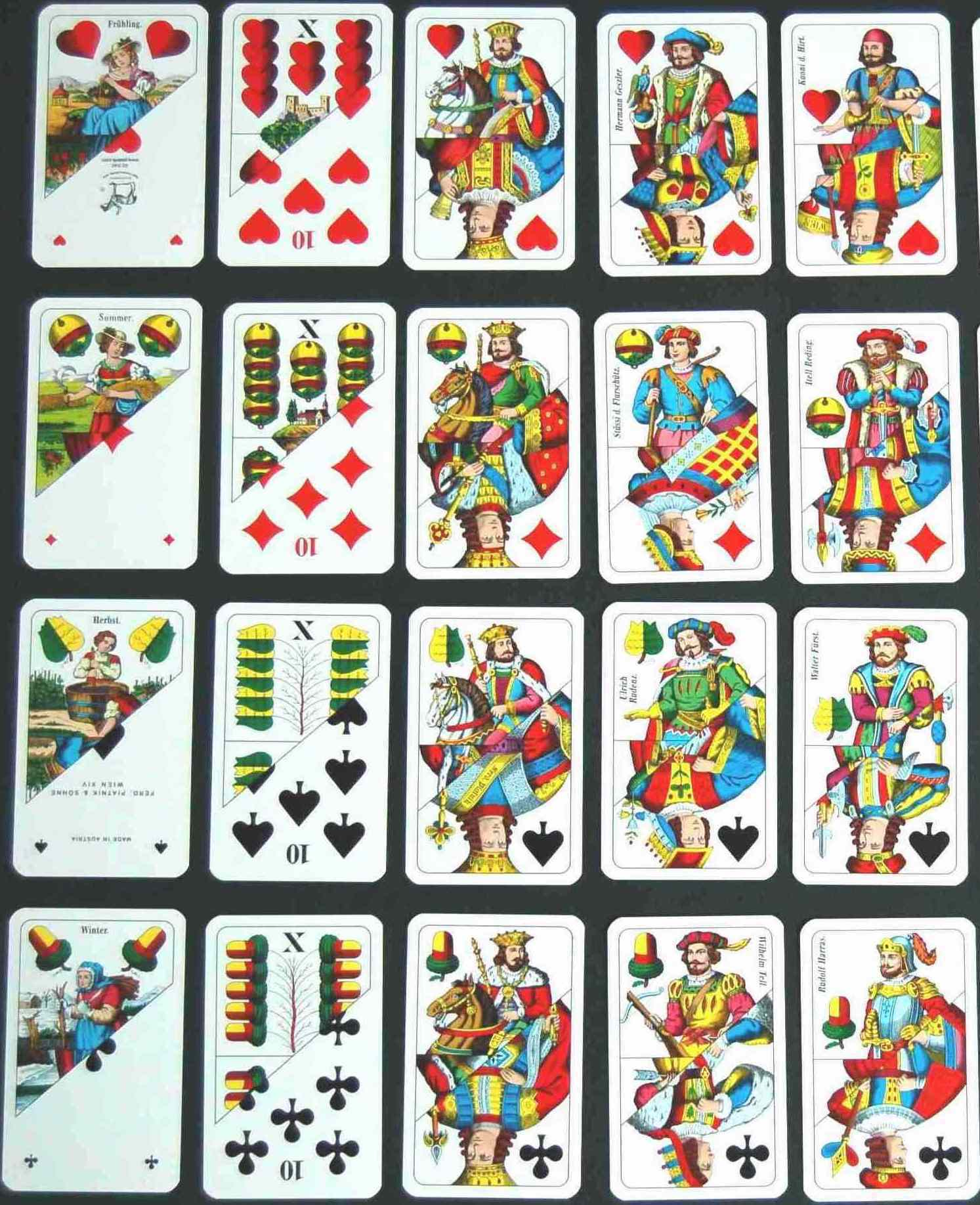
Double German-French Schnapsen cards

Depending on the region, Schnapsen is either played with French or Double German playing cards, also known as the William Tell pattern. For tournaments in which players from different regions meet, there are special Double German-French cards (see illustration). Schnapsen is played with a deck of 20 cards unlike Sechsundsechzig (Sixty-Six), the game it resembles, which uses 24 cards. Unlike Sechsundsechzig, the 9 is not used in Schnapsen.

Card Suits
French suits				
Name	Hearts (Herz)	Diamonds (Karo)	Spades (Pik)	Clubs (Treff, Kreuz)
Double German (William Tell) suits				
Name	Hearts (Rot, Herz)	Bells (Schelle)	Leaves (Grün, Laub)	Acorns (Eichel)

In each suit there are five cards:

Card Values
French suited card	German suited card	Card points
Ace (Ass)	Deuce or Sow (Daus/Sau)	11
Ten (Zehner)	Zehner	10
King (König)	König	4
Queen (Dame)	Manderl (Ober)	3
Jack (Bube)	Bauer (Unter)	2

In Austrian German, the Manderl is the name for the Ober, and the Bauer is the name for the Unter.

=== Dealing ===
The dealer is decided by the drawing of cards. The player who draws the higher card, deals the first round; the other player is Forehand (Vorhand).

Dealer shuffles, cuts and deals the cards as follows: three cards are dealt to Forehand and then three to Dealer. Next, a seventh card is flipped indicating the trump suit. Finally, two cards are dealt to Forehand and two to Dealer giving each player a 5-card hand.

The remaining nine cards (exactly half the deck) form the talon and are placed facedown across the turn-up, so that half of the latter turn-up card is visible. The suit of the turn-up becomes the trump suit, regionally called the Atout.

In subsequent deals, the players alternate the roles of Dealer and Forehand.

=== Playing ===
Schnapsen is a trick-taking game in which each trick consists of two cards. Forehand leads the first trick by placing a card faceup in the center of the table. At the start of the game, players do not have to follow suit or win the trick: Dealer may either head the trick with a higher card of the same card suit or a trump (which wins the trick). Alternatively, Dealer may discard a card of their choice and giving up the trick to Forehand. The player who has won the trick places the trick facedown and draws the top card from the talon. The opponent draws the next top card from the talon. After both players have brought their hands back up to five cards, the winner of the last trick leads the next trick.

The game continues in this way until the talon is used up – unless one of the players has previously announced 66 points or flips the turn-up to close the talon (see below). If the talon is used up or was closed, players must follow suit (Farbzwang) and win the trick if possible (Stichzwang) from this point onwards. That means during their turn a player must:

- Head the trick with a higher card of the same suit.
- If unable to do so, they must discard a lower card of the same suit.
- If both above are not possible, they must head the trick with a trump.
- Only if they are unable to do the three above, they can discard a card of their choice.

Following suit (Farbzwang) always takes precedence over winning the trick (Stichzwang): a player may not play a trump if they can follow suit. A breach of this rule is called revoking and is penalized with the immediate loss of the deal and the opponent receiving 3 points.

=== Going out ===
If a player reaches 66 or more card points (Augen) after winning a trick or announcing a marriage (see below), he may 'go out' (ausmelden), usually by saying "I have enough" (Ich habe genug) or just "enough" (genug). A player may not go out at any other time. After this, the game ends and each player counts the card points they have amassed.

- If the opponent has not taken a single trick, the player scores 3 points.
- If the opponent has 32 card points or fewer, the player scores 2 points.
- If the opponent has 33 or more card points, the player scores one point.

If a player discovers he has fewer than 66 card points and has thus ended the deal by mistake, play stops and his opponent wins as many points as the player would have won if they had been right.

=== Last trick ===
If neither player goes out before the last card is played, the last card must be played and the winner of the last trick is the winner of the deal, scoring one point. This rule does not apply if the talon has been closed (see below).

=== Marriages ===
If a player holds a King and Ober (or King and Queen) of the same suit, they may meld them (ansagen, melden) when it is their turn to lead and score the following (bonus) points:

- For a trump marriage, 40 points; this is known as a Forty-er (Vierziger) or 'royal marriage'.
- For a non-trump marriage, 20 points. this is a Twenty-er (Zwanziger).

Forehand may meld a marriage at the start. (However, for the Sharp Schnapsen variant detailed below, the marriage may only be melded after the player wins their trick and not at the start.) The player who melds a marriage must play one of the 2 cards to the next trick. (However, in Sharp Schnapsen, the melding player must play the king.)

If the player who has melded a marriage fails to take any tricks during the game, the marriage points do not count. If the marriage card is subsequently beaten on the next trick and the player takes a trick later in the deal, the points still stand.

To avoid subsequent disputes in scoring the points, it is recommended to show both the cards of the pair.

The King-Queen pair is known in games of the Bezique family and in Poch as a marriage. This term is common and makes more sense when playing with French suited cards.

=== Trump Unter ===
If a player is on lead and holds the Trump Unter (or Trump Jack), the player may exchange it for the trump turn-up before leading to the trick.

Forehand may do this before the game starts. (However, in Sharp Schnapsen, the Trump Unter can only be exchanged after the first trick is played out.)

=== Closing the talon ===
When it is his turn, if a player believes he can achieve the required 66 points without replenishing his hand from the talon, he can 'close' it. He draws the turn-up from the bottom of the talon and lays it across the top. From this point, players must follow suit and attempt to win each trick just as if the talon had been exhausted. If the player who closed the talon succeeds in collecting 66 points and claiming victory before his opponent does, he has won. The number of game points scored depends on the number of card points collected at the time the talon is closed. The tricks and marriages of the opponent at that point are counted immediately after the talon is closed. If the player who closed the talon fails to reach 66 card points, or if his opponent, beats him to it, the opponent wins:

- 3 points if he had no tricks when the talon was closed, otherwise
- 2 points

=== Bummerls and rubbers ===
A Bummerl consists of several individual hands and the dealer alternates with each hand. The player who is the first to seven game points wins and their opponent records this with a large dot (●) against their name, also called a Bummerl.

One feature of Schnapsen is counting "from seven downwards" (von Sieben herunter ); i.e. you do not count the game points already scored, but record the number of points still needed to win. Both players thus begin with seven points; if a player wins the first game with 3 game points, their point score reduces to four. Scores are either traditionally recorded on a small chalk board or with the aid of a Bummerl counter (Bummerlzähler): the seven large beads (Perlen) on the outer arch indicate the current score of the hand or Bummerl being played, while the smaller beads on the inner arch show the number of Bummerls already played.

- If a player wins 7–0, his opponent is Schneider (Schneiderbummerl) and the loss is doubled. The loser chalks up 2 Bummerls – this rule does not apply in tournaments.
- In all other cases the loser receives one Bummerl.

A rubber (Partie) consists, either by agreement or tournament rules, of two or three Bummerls, i.e. the player who gets his opponent to chalk up two or three Bummerls, wins the rubber.

From this is derived the saying: Einer kriegt immer das Bummerl (German) / Oana kriagt imma dös bummal (Austrian) which means "Someone always gets the Bummerl", i.e. "someone always loses out".

== Sharp Schnapsen ==
The above rules describe the so-called 'soft' Schnapsen. Sharp Schnapsen (Scharfes Schnapsen) has the following rule changes:

- Played tricks may not be looked at; players must count their own card points as they go
- If only one card of the talon is left on the trump turn-up a player may not close the talon and may not exchange the trump either
- Forehand may not exchange the trump turn-up before the first trick
- Players must have at least one trick before melding a pair or marriage (Zwanziger, Vierziger).
- If a player melds a pair, they must play the King to the next trick – playing the Ober or Queen is not permitted.
- Players may not draw from the talon until the previous trick has been turned over (facedown).

== Tournament Schnapsen ==
Schnapsen enjoys great popularity in Austria and is played at numerous tournaments. The predominant tournament type is Preisschnapsen. Less often a Swiss-system tournament is played. The winner of a match is the player who is the first to "add" 2 bummerls to his opponent's score sheet. If a game is won with a score of 7:0, this only counts as 1 bummerl in tournament play, not two as in private games. Depending on the tournament rules, either 'soft' (weich) or 'sharp' (scharf / hart) Schnapsen may be played.

=== Preisschnapsen ===
A Preisschnapsen tournament is played to a 'modified' knockout system. This tournament form is also used for Watten, where it is called Preiswatten. While in the usual knockout system a player is eliminated after his first defeat, this is not always the case in the case of Preisschnapsen, as a player can buy several entry cards in some tournaments.

==== Participant cards ====
Before the start of the tournament 'participant cards' are issued, the number of cards always being a power of two - for example, 32, 64, 128 - and depending on the expected number of players. Each player may buy a certain number of entry cards - variously called Lose ("batches" or "lots"), Leben ("lives") or Standkarten ("entry cards"), up to a maximum of, say, three cards, as specified in the tournament invitation. Unsold tickets are Freilose ("byes").

==== Draws ====
The pairings for the first round are then drawn by lots. Draws are held in such a way that a player who has several entry cards does not have to play against himself if possible. In the higher rounds, however, this may happen, in which case the player concerned must hand in one participant card and may advance to the next round with the other card.

A typical draw proceeds as follows. Assuming 64 entry cards are issued, 32 games will be played in the first round of the tournament. For the draw two pots are used - a 'right' and a 'left' pot - in each of which 32 cards with the numbers 1 to 32 are placed. Now the individual players draw, according to the number of entry cards they have bought, starting with the left pot: if the first player has bought three cards, he draws three cards from the left pot, and so on. Only when all cards have been drawn from the left pot, are cards drawn from the right pot. If the left pot is empty and the player who drew the last card from it also has to draw from the right, it is conceivable that he could draw the same number again. If so, he is allowed to re-draw from the right pot.

The numbers left in the right pot after all players have drawn their 'round numbers' are byes, i.e. the players who have drawn the corresponding numbers from the left pot move up to the next round without having to compete. The participants who have drawn the same number, now meet in the first round and play a game for, usually, 2 bummerls.

==== Rounds ====
Of course, not all games in a round can be played at the same time, as a player who has several entry cards has to play against several opponents. There is no schedule showing when which player has to play which opponent. Each player has to track down his opponent - assisted by the tournament management team. The winner of a game keeps his entry card and moves on to the next round, the loser must hand in an entry card - but as long as he still has further entry cards, he remains in the tournament. Once all games in a round are finished, the pairings for the next round are drawn, with players who still have more than one entry card drawing first.

==== Prizes ====
There are usually eight prizes at a Preisschnapsen tournament:

- 1st prize: tournament winner
- 2nd prize: finalist
- 3rd and 4th prizes: the losers of the two semi-final games play for third place.
- 5th to 8th prizes: the four losers of the quarter-finals meet; the winners from these matches then play for 5th and 6th places; the losers play for 7th and 8th places.

A player who purchases more than one entry card can also win more than one prize, unless the tournament conditions expressly state otherwise.

The winner of a Preisschnapsen used to receive a goose as first prize.

== Legal ==
According to Austrian law, Schnapsen − unlike the various poker variants − is not a game of chance used for gambling, but a game of skill, viz.:

"Typical games of skill are Tarock, Bridge, Schnapsen or chess."

== Related games ==
- Sechsundsechzig
- Bauernschnapsen is a variant for four players
- Dreierschnapsen is a variant for three players
- Russian Schnapsen

== Literature ==
- Babsch, Fritz (1983). Internationale und österreichische Kartenspiel-Regeln, Vienna.
- Bamberger, Johannes (2012). Schnapsen. Die schönsten Varianten, Perlen-Reihe, Vol. 639, Perlen-Reihe, Vienna o. J.
- Beck, Fritz (1961) Schnapsen (Sechsundsechzig) Preisschnapsen, Perlen-Reihe, Vol. 639, Perlen-Reihe, Vienna.
- Gugl, Helmuth (1971) Meisterschnapsen, Piatnik, Vienna.
- Tompa, Martin (2015) Winning Schnapsen: From Card Play Basics to Expert Strategy. ISBN 978-1515377368.
- Unger, Franz (c. 1920). Besigue, Schnapsen, Binokel, Pinnageln. Vienna: Mickl.
