= Russian Schnapsen =

Card game

1000
- Russian trick-taking game
- Origin: Russia
- Type: Point-trick
- Players: 2-4, best at 3
- Cards: 24
- Deck: French or William Tell cards
- Rank (high→low): A 10 K Q J 9
- Play: Alternate

Related games
- 66, 1001, Mariáš

Russian Schnapsen, Thousand Schnapsen, 1000 or Tysiacha is a trick-taking game of the ace–ten family for three players, the aim of which is to score over 1000 points to win the game. It is a variant of the popular Austrian game of Schnapsen. Like its parent, Russian Schnapsen features "marriages" (pairs of a King and Ober/Queen of the same suit) which are worth extra points.

== Cards ==
Russian Schnapsen is usually played with a 24-card Schnapsen pack using the normal William Tell cards. In Russia it is played with French-suited cards, using a 24 card deck where all cards lower than a nine have been removed.

There are the usual four suits: Hearts (Herz or Rot), Bells (Schelle), Leaves (Grün, Laub or Blatt) and Acorns (Eichel). In each suit the cards rank and score as follows: ace (Ass) – 11 points, ten (Zehner) – 10 points, king (König) – 4 points, Ober (Ober) – 3 points, Unter (Unter) – 2 points and nine (Neuner) – 0 points. If French-suited cards are used, the queen replaces the Ober and the jack, the Unter.

== Dealing cards ==
The first dealer is chosen either by drawing lots or by mutual agreement. The dealer rotates clockwise with each hand. Before dealing (after shuffling), the deck is cut by the player on the dealer's right. After cutting, the top part is placed on the table and bottom card is checked by the dealer. In case bottom card is Nine, serving player shows it to all player announcing that it is a Nine and asks same player sitting by his right hand to split / cut the deck again. In case the deck is split third time in a row by the same player in the same round and bottom card is Nine - player who cut / split the deck (the one who is sitting by right hand from serving player) gets minus 120 points and this round is skipped, serving turn goes to next player.

Dealing cards is made clockwise, with one card per iteration, starting from the player sitting by left hand from dealer. During dealing three cards out of deck are put to the stock: top (first) card, bottom card and any other card. Dealing cards is very delicate and typically dealer can be charged with -120 scores fine if not agreed beforehand otherwise. Dealing cards is counted as failed in next circumstances:

- If any card is flipped during dealing
- If lock or any number of players has wrong number of cards after dealing is done
- If deck was not split / cut before dealing started
- With four players dealer accidentally or not, but discloses any information related to stock

Usually, if dealer is not charged with fine, then same dealer re-deals the deck, otherwise - dealing goes to a next player clockwise.

When playing with four player dealer only serves the deck and holds the stock until bidding is over. Dealer in this case is allowed to see the stock before bidding is over but is strictly disallowed to share whatsoever he knows about its contents. When bidding is over and two out of three players taking part in bidding have passed / opted out / lost bidding - stock is flipped over so that every player can see it and afterwards given to player who won bidding.

All three players get seven cards during dealing. The player who won the bidding gets stock (+3 cards), and temporarily has 10 cards. In order to make number of cards even, winner of bidding has to give away by one card to both of the opponent players out of his full hand (10 cards), which cards to give away - is the decision up to the bidding winner. After this every player has eight cards in hand.

=== Re-dealing cards ===
In particular cases players can demand re-dealing after the cards were dealt:

- all four nines in one player's hand (player who has this hand can demand re-dealing)
- two nines in the stock (player who won the bidding and got stock can demand re-dealing)
- in case bidding-winner player gives away nine and as a result another player has four nines in his hand, latter one can demand re-dealing

== Bidding ==
Bid is number of scores player states he can achieve in this round. Every game round there has to be a player who has an obligation to get 100 or more scores, the player is determined by bidding round - the player who made the bigger bid wins the bidding round. In order to support / give this player advantage - stock will be given to the player who wins the bidding round. After cards are dealt, player next clock-wise after the dealer starts the bidding with 100 points, this player is often called "first hand". Players after observing their hand cards are taking part in bidding one-by-one strictly clock-wise in order. Only after previous player stated his bid or passed his turn, next player can bid. When both of opponent player will pass (will not make bigger bid), the player who make biggest bid wins the bidding round. It is possible that after first hand player said initial bid of 100 points - both of the opponent players can pass, in this case first hand player has no options and wins the bidding round. If a player passes their bidding turn, he passes it permanently for this game round and cannot make bid even if the bidding turn comes back again to him, thus he is not taking part in bidding for this round anymore. Minimum bid increment is 5 points, all bids have to be divisible by 5. (100 / 105 / 155 / etc.)

Notice: The final declaration of points the bidding-winner player is obliged to score during game round can be increased after the stock is observed and cards are given away.

In some variants, players have the option to not view their hand prior to bidding. This is known as a blind bet and all tricks are worth double for that round if bidding is won blind.

=== Bidding limitation ===
During bidding round players are not allowed to increase the bid over 120 points unless they have a marriage in their hand. If this rule is broken, the player who broke the rule gets a negative number of declared bid and the current game round is skipped.

== Gameplay ==
=== Taking tricks ===
Player who won bidding starts the game by making move, usually with highest card that guarantees the trick, every other players in a clockwise order one-by-one responds to the move by placing a single card from own hand according to rules:

- top priority: card of the same suit: mandatory to use if available on hand
- second priority: trump: mandatory to use if available on hand and prohibited to use if card of the same suit available
- any card

For deliberately breaking the rules player is charged with 120 points fine, it is deducted from the current sum-up number of points available for that player. Every next move is made by a player who took last trick. All tricks are saved until the round is finished, then the scores are counted and summed-up to previous round results. If the player who won bidding did not achieve their declared number of scores, he gets a negative number of declared scores. Number of scores achieved is calculated from the tricks-taken and marriages.

Taking a trick is done by placing a highest card in the turn. E.g.:

1. Diamonds suit has been declared as trump suit: player #1 makes a move with ten of spades, player #2 responds with ace of spades, player #3 responds with nine of diamonds – this trick is taken by player #3, because his nine of diamonds is a trump card. Next move is done by player #3.
2. No trump suit declared: player #1 makes a move with ten of spades, player #2 responds with ace of spades, which will win the hand since there is no card that can beat the ace in the suit led when there is no trump; player #3 drops the nine of diamonds. Next move is done by Player #2.

=== Game scores – rank values ===
Number of cards in the deck – 24, in 4 suits. Order of hierarchy (top to bottom): ace, ten, king, Ober/queen, Unter/jack, nine.

Different cards give different numbers of points:

| Rank | Points |
|---|---|
| Ace | 11 |
| 10 | 10 |
| King | 4 |
| Ober (or queen) | 3 |
| Unter (or jack) | 2 |
| 9 | 0 |

Total number of points / scores in deck : 120 Total number of points / scores in one suit: 30

=== Trumps ===
In the beginning of every round there is no trump suit, all suits are equal. The player who has at least one trick taken and still has a marriage in his hand can declare a suit of the marriage to be a trump suit by making a move with either King or Ober/Queen card from available marriage and declaring it out loud by saying that suit X (X corresponds to the marriage suit) becomes a trump, or saying number of scores he gets by declaring a marriage suit a trump. The suit that just became a trump stays a trump until a new suit becomes appointed to be trump or until game round ends.

=== Marriage ===
Marriage is a feature of the game and consists of king and Ober/queen of the same suit in one player's hand. When used in the game it allows the setting of the trump suit for the round and gives an instant number of score points depending on the suit it belongs to. The only two conditions to use it are:

- player has to have at least one trick taken before he / she can use marriage
- player has to have full marriage set – both king and Ober/queen in the hand for the moment when marriage is used

To use a marriage, player has to make a move with either Ober/queen or king of the marriage pair and declare out loud about assigning a suit of the marriage just used to be a trump. If player failed to declare in any way a marriage when he used either of the two marriage cards (king or Ober/queen), then the card is treated as regular and no trump change, no score addition takes place.

If one of the players declares a trump suit, another players have a chance to declare a new trump suit (provided that they have a marriage of different suit) as soon as they will get a move chance (they will take trick). When new suit is appointed to be a trump instead of existing, previous trump becomes a regular suit immediately.

There is no limit on how many marriages can be used by any player during game round.

Different marriages give different numbers of points (king and Ober/queen):

| Marriage suit | Points |
|---|---|
| Hearts | 100 |
| Bells/Diamonds | 80 |
| Leaves/Clubs | 60 |
| Acorns/Spades | 40 |

=== Score point counting ===
After game round ends – players count their scores. Every player counts how many scores he achieved in the round by summing up all scores each card he got as tricks has and marriages scores if there were any. Scores for players who did not win bidding round are rounded up or down to closest divisible by 5, e.g. 63 points is counted as 65; 62 points are counted as 60 Scores for player who won the bidding round is compared with the number of scores he declared before first move:

- in case he got more or equal number of scores - this player managed to achieve his goal and gets as many points as he declared, not more, even if number of achieved scores is significantly bigger than declared;
- in case he got less (even by 1 point), then player failed to achieve the bid he declared and gets the negative number of points he declared, meaning that the number of points he declared will be deducted from his previous result.

A sum of scores all players achieved from tricks (excluding additional scores from marriages) should correspond to a number of scores available in the deck : 120.

During Golden round the number of scores is doubled, even if it's negative.

When playing with four players, dealer gets number points that was in the Stock, including marriages, if there was one full marriage in the Stock, meaning that both Ober or Queen and King of the same suit are among the three Stock cards.

In case player who did not win bidding has got 0 tricks, he gets special remark for that round – "bolt".

=== Bolt ===
In case player who did not win bidding gets zero tricks by the end of the game round, in addition to zero points he gets special mark, called bolt or strike-through. There marks are stored in the game table until player gets third such mark, when third time player gets zero points in the round when he did not win bidding, previous two marks are removed (crossed-out) and player gets minus 120 points for this round.

The player who won bidding cannot be assigned a bolt for the round even if he had no tricks, hence he gets a negative number of declared scores.

During Golden round all points are double, even bolts, player who did not win bidding and got zero points gets two bolts / strike-throughs.

The only exception is when a player gets one trick with a number of scores less than 3 (three Nines, or two Nines and a Jack/Unter) which is rounded down to zero, in this case bolt is not assigned to this player.

== The barrel / 880 points ==
The game goes in regular mode until any of the players gets to 880 or more points. At that moment the player is said to "climb onto the barrel" and his scores are fixed at 880.

=== Scores counting ===
Player on the barrel has an advantage: no scores is counted for this player except three special cases:

- if player who is on the barrel did not win bidding and got zero tricks - he gets a bolt / strike-through: in case it's a third time, previous two are discarded / crossed-out and player gets minus 120 points, this forces player to climb down from barrel, throwing him back to 760 points;
- if player won bidding and declared to achieve more than 120 points: in this case player either wins the game or gets down to 880 minus X points, where X was declared by this player
- player who is on the barrel played three consecutive game rounds and did not win - gets minus 120 points and "climbs down from barrel"

If a player who is on the barrel claims to achieve 120 points (which is the maximum allowed to claim without having a marriage), and wins the bidding, then this player gets Stock and considers to increase the number of claimed scores in order to win the game. In case player who is on the barrel has won bidding, declared only 120 points, then regardless of how much scores he manages to achieve - they are not counted.

When third time player climbs down from the barrel, his scores are reset to zero.

=== Winning the game ===
Only a player sitting on a barrel can win the game. In order to do so, he has three attempts (three game rounds) to:

- win the bidding
- declare to achieve more than 120 points (this effectively means that he has to have a marriage)
- achieve declared number of scores

When all three conditions are met, player gets more than 1000 points and becomes winner of the game.

If player failed to win in three attempts - he is charged with 125 points fine.

=== Several players on barrel ===
When playing with three players, there can be only one player on barrel. When second player gets to 880 points, the player who on the barrel "gets down from it" and is charged with fine of 125 points (down to 755 points). If there are two players simultaneously achieving 880 scores, both of them are thrown back to 755 points. When playing with four players, two players are allowed to be on the barrel, the first one to get, first gets down from it.

== Golden tour ==
During first circle of game rounds (number of game rounds equals to number of players, in other words until serving turn comes back first time to player who first served cards in the game) if agreed beforehand, golden tour can take place. During golden tour there is no bidding for stock, the first hand player has an obligation to achieve 120 points and is automatically a bidding winner. In this tour all points for all players are doubled, even negative, even bolts, even charges with fines.

== Variants for 2 and 4 players ==
In a two-player variant, the game is played with two stocks, and the player who wins bidding can choose either one, and discards a card to the other stock. The other stock is given to the player who takes the last trick.

The game can be played with four players by using a sit out dealer, who scores cards in the stock.
