= Mariáš =

Card game

- Three-player solo trick-taking game with marriages
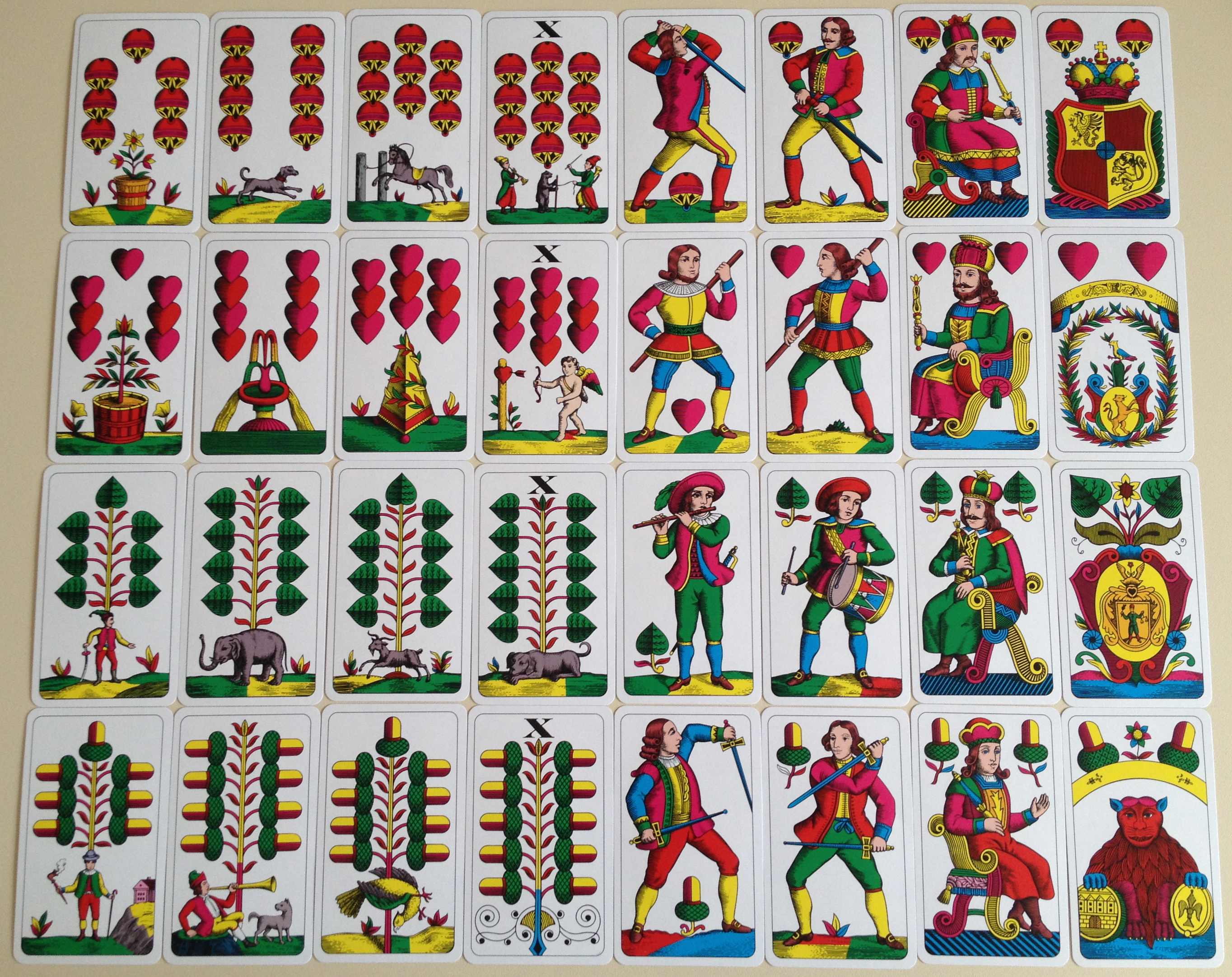
- Bohemian-pattern cards used for Mariáš
- Origin: Czechoslovakia
- Alternative names: Mariasch
- Type: Point-trick
- Players: 3
- Cards: 32
- Deck: Bohemian or William Tell cards
- Play: Clockwise
- Playing time: 20 minutes
- Chance: Medium

Related games
- Ulti, Sixty-six

Mariáš or Mariasch a three-player, solo trick-taking game of the king–queen family of ace–ten games, but with a simplified scoring system. It is one of the most popular card games in the Czech Republic and Slovakia, but is also played in Bavaria in Germany as well as in Austria. The Hungarian national card game Ulti is an elaboration of Mariáš.

== Variants in former Czechoslovakia ==
- Lízaný mariáš (Draw Mariage) – trick-and-draw game, two players, very similar to old German card game, Mariage and Polish Tysiąc (one thousand)
- Volený mariáš (Called Mariage) – three players, no drawing, eldest hand determines the trump suit, the other players defend together in partnership
- Křížový mariáš (Cross Mariage) – four players, 8 tricks, elder hand sets up the trump suit and calls (chooses) one trump honour card to be in partnership, two others are defenders)
- Licitovaný mariáš (Auction Mariage) – three players, ten tricks bidding phase like in the contract bridge, the strongest player chooses the contract, the other two players become the defenders
- Hvězdicový mariáš (Star Mariage) – five players, six tricks, bidding phase and contractor calls the trump honour, the other three players become the defenders

== Basic rules ==
- only 32 playing cards: A, 10, K, O, U, 9, 8, 7 in four suits (card 10 is higher than King, except Betl and Durch contracts)
- follow the suit in the trick (like bridge)
- necessity play higher card (override) to kill (take) the trick (unlike bridge)
- if unable to follow suit, necessity play trump card (unlike bridge)
- if unable to kill the trick, smaller card is possible

== No shuffling ==
The winner of the trick places the cards played to own winning stack on the table (and begin a new trick). Some deals are played only a few tricks and the declarer resigns or shows a winning hand. The score is calculated by adding the counters in all the stacks, but these cards stay in order. The card sequence in the tricks must be conserved. Dealer collect all stacks together without shuffling and offers the opportunity to cut the cards before a new deal. The players can use the information about following "cards in a row" in previous deal, if the cards were shown. This aspect boost the calculations in the next deals, some hands look strong enough, but the reality is different due to odd distribution of honours or suits that are too long or too short in the hands of other players.

== Cutting ==
Cutting is necessary (note that cutting just one card, or all bar one card, is forbidden) and especially the powerful finesse cause the strong cards can be sent to the cutter´s hand in next deal. Dealer has some possibilities to prevent, he could collect all the stacks in the right way before the cutting. Dealing is ordered by a scheme, after the cutting... alea iacta est)

== Dealing ==
- 7-5-5-5-5-5 in Volený mariáš (the elder hand sets up the trump suit when he has seven cards in hand, after the setting he takes the second part – another five cards, then chooses and puts two cards aside)
- 4-4-4-4-4-4-4-4 in Křížový mariáš (elder hand set-up trump when he has four cards in hand)
- 5-5-5-2-5-5-5 in Licitovaný mariáš (the winner of bidding process can take two cards left on the table (talon) and put off another two cards and then he pronounces the commitments in his contract).

== Scoring ==
- Ace = 10 points, 10 = 10 points, last trick (ultimo) = 10 points (summarised 90 points)
- Marriage (K+Q in the same suit in one player´s hand) trump suit 40 points, other suits 20, 20, 20 points (100 bonus points, 190 maximum score)
- draw-game (the same score) is not possible

== Special contracts with bonuses ==
- Betl (win 0 trick) or Durch (win all tricks) are special plain-trick games incorporated (escape from point-trick game, good chance to win against strong cards)
- 7 – play the smallest trump card in the last trick (need to win this trick)
- 100 – score 100 points or more (90 points lost the game, need 60+40 with trump marriage or 80+20 with no-trump marriage, each overtrick adds payment bonus)
- 2x7 – need win no-trump suit 7 in the penultimate trick, trump 7 after that in the last trick (requirement: two long suits in hand)

"Flek!" (reply by defenders after the contract announcement) doubles the stake. The declarers can reply with "Re", etc. Hearts set up as trump suit – double payments.

== Rufmariasch ==
Rufmariasch is a Danube Swabian variant of Marias for 4 players with variable partnerships. A William Tell pack of 32 cards is used with Aces ranking high and the usual four suits: Green (Grüne), Bells (Schelle), Acorns (Eichel) and Hearts (Herz). The dealers shuffles and has the cards cut before dealing 4 cards each. Forehand in this game is the declarer (Spieler, lit. "player") must now "call" by naming any card in the pack. The called card determines trump and its holder becomes the declarer's secret partner. The dealer now deals the remaining packet of 4 cards to each player.

Players may score bonus points by melding the King and Ober of the same suit. This may be done before play begins and up to the play of the last card of the first trick. A player melds by laying both cards on the table. Provided the melder takes at least one trick during play, this scores 20 points that team. A trump meld scores 40.

The declarer leads to the first trick. Players must follow suit if able; otherwise must trump if possible. Subject to those rules, players must also head the trick if they can. The highest trump takes the trick or the highest card of the led suit if no trumps are played. The trick winner leads to the next trick.

Teams score 10 points for each Ace and Ten taken in tricks; in addition there are 10 points for winning the last trick. Melds are added to the score if the melder took at least one trick. The team with the higher score wins and the losers pay the difference to the winners.
