= Ulti =

National Hungary card game

- Origin: Hungary
- Alternative names: Talonmáriás
- Type: Point-trick
- Players: 3
- Skills: Tactics & Strategy
- Cards: 32
- Deck: German playing cards
- Play: Anticlockwise
- Playing time: approx. 20 minutes
- Chance: Medium

Related games
- Sixty-six

Ulti, or Ultimó, is Hungary's national trick-taking card game for three players. It is virtually unknown outside its home borders.

== History ==
Its name derives from the winning of the last trick with the lowest trump, a feature derived from several games like Trappola and Tapp Tarock played in Central Europe and in the former Austro-Hungarian empire, though the game as a whole is probably a further development of Mariaš, first mentioned in Hungary in 1787 and first described in 1883 as suggested by its alternative title Talonmariaš, described as "ultimáriás" by G. J. Potter in 1930. All games ultimately derive from the old French game of Mariage.

== Different sets of rules ==
The rules of the game are not universal, and typically each group of players will have their own set of rules that they agree upon. When people play together for the first time, it often takes considerable amount of time until they can agree on a rule set that is played. Some rules can significantly alter the strategy (see references for a different set of rules from what is described below).

== Preliminaries ==
Three players use a 32-card pack, with cards normally ranking in descending order Ace X King Over Under IX VIII VII. The first dealer is chosen by any agreed means and thereafter the turn to deal and play passes to the right. The dealer deals a batch of five cards to each player, seven to the first player on their right, and then another batch of five cards to each of the other two players.

== Object and contracts ==
Each game starts with an auction. The highest bidder becomes the soloist and plays alone against the other two with an objective to fulfill whatever contract they bid for. In trump games, Aces and Tens captured in tricks worth 10 points each, and winning the last trick is worth a further 10, making a possible total of 90. In addition, declaring a marriage (King and Over of the same suit) scores 20, or 40 in trumps, bringing the maximum possible total to 190. Ties are not possible because of the extra 10 points for the last trick. In no-trump contracts, card points and marriages do not count, and cards rank from top to bottom A K O U X IX VIII VII.

=== Bids ===
Type of bid	Winning conditions	Losing conditions	Value if won	Value if lost	Trump game	Rank of tens	Extra Simple bid
Simple	The calling player ends the game with a score higher than the defending team.	The calling player ends the game with a score lower than the defending team.	1	1	Yes	High	-
40-100	The calling player has a marriage in trumps and scores at least 60 additional points from tricks. No players may declare more marriages in this game.	The calling player fails to score at least 60 points from tricks.	4	4	Yes	High	No
Four Aces	The calling player wins all tricks where aces are played.	The calling player loses at least one ace to the defending team.	4	4	Yes	High	Yes
Ulti	The calling player wins the last trick with the Seven of trumps.	The calling player fails to play the Seven of trumps on the last trick or loses the last trick to a higher trump.	4	4+4	Yes	High	Yes
Betli	The calling player loses all tricks.	The calling player wins at least 1 trick.	5	5	No	Low	No
Plain Durchmars	The calling player wins all tricks.	The calling player loses at least 1 trick.	6	6	No	Low	No
Trump Durchmars	The calling player wins all tricks.	The calling player loses at least 1 trick.	6	6	Yes	High	No
20-100	The calling player has a marriage in a non-trump suit and scores at least 80 additional points from tricks. No players may declare more marriages in this game.	The calling player fails to score at least 80 points from tricks.	8	8	Yes	High	No

All bids have a form of two distinct bids; for trump games a single value bid where the trump is either Acorns, Bells or Leaves (but is not announced during the auction) and a double value bid where the trump is Hearts. In the latter case, the suffix "of Hearts" is appended to the bid. The suit of Hearts itself bears no other distinction in the game; however, by otherwise naming the trump during the auction the player gives away information and is thus slightly disadvantaged.

In no-trump games such as Betli or Plain Durchmars, the double value form of the bid is merely an identical, second stage which helps the auction keep going for higher bids.

Betli and Durchmars also have an additional form called Open. When playing an Open bid, all players put their cards on the table and show it to the others right after the first trick. Professional players usually end the game after "opening", as they inspect the hands and conclude whether the calling player would win or lose the game. Open bids are worth quadruple the base value of Betli and Plain Durchmars, and double in Trump Durchmars.

Possible bid constructs in Ulti.

Bids can be freely combined as long as they do not conflict. The value of a combined bid is the sum of the individual components' values. At the conclusion of the game, the constituent bets are evaluated and scored independently. A 40-100 Durchmars Ulti therefore nets 4+6+4=14 points if all undertakings succeed and 4−6+4=2 points if the Durchmars happens to fail. Doubling is done component-by-component as well, meaning that if a defender successfully doubles Durchmars in the above example the net result of the round is 4−12+4=−4 points.

Ulti is a unique bid in the sense that it carries an additional penalty of 4 points if lost (8 for Ulti of Hearts). Doubling, however, doesn't affect the penalty so a doubled and lost Ulti of Acorns costs 8+4 points for the bidder (16+4 if redoubled, 32+4 if surdoubled and so on).

Ulti and Four Aces are worth an extra point (2 for Hearts) besides their standard value if they were not combined with any other bids as they implicitly get combined with a Simple. Therefore, the soloist should attempt to complete an extra objective in this case: to score more than the defending team. However, since the constituent bets are handled independently, failing to complete the Simple will still cost the soloist the value of Simple. The Simple component like any component in any bid can be doubled separately.

Usually a player who bids a single value (non-Hearts) Simple forfeits the game doubled if no higher bid is made by anyone including themselves. This is done to prevent opponents from completing silent bids and to speed up the game playing more valuable bids. In certain circles, forfeiting a game of Simple is not optional but done by convention.

In the auction, a bid is ranked above another bid if its total value is either higher than the other bid's or is equal but made up of less components. An Ulti (4+1 points) thus can be declared over a 40-100 (4 points) and a Betli (5 points) can be declared over an Ulti. There is one exception to this rule: although having the same total value and number of components, Ulti of Hearts and Four Aces of Hearts can be overbid by 40-100 Durchmars or Ulti Durchmars to facilitate playing more of these infrequent but arguably more exciting bids with lower potential silent bonuses. If more bids have the same value and the same amount of component then the valid is that said sooner, but in equal position Ulti is always higher than Four Aces. For example, 40-100 Ulti Four Aces (12 points) is lower than 20-100 Four Aces (12 points) which is lower than 20-100 Ulti (12 points).

The following table recites all 54 possible bids in ascending order of value and precedence. Ranking and alternating row colors represent increments in this 42-step bidding ladder as there are many combinations of equal value which can never be bid over one another.

Ranking	Total single value	Components	Bid name	Silent 100	Silent Ulti	Silent Durchmars	Trump suit
1	1	1	Simple	2	2	3	Acorns/Bells/Leaves
2	2	2	Simple of Hearts	4	4	6	Hearts
3	4	4	40-100	-	2	3	Acorns/Bells/Leaves
4	5	4+1	Four Aces	2	2	3	Acorns/Bells/Leaves
5	5	4+1	Ulti	2	-	3	Acorns/Bells/Leaves
6	5	5	Betli	-	-	-	-
7	6	6	Trump Durchmars	-	2	-	Acorns/Bells/Leaves
7	6	6	Plain Durchmars	-	-	-	-
8	8	4+4	40-100 Four Aces	-	2	3	Acorns/Bells/Leaves
9	8	4+4	40-100 Ulti	-	-	3	Acorns/Bells/Leaves
10	8	8	40-100 of Hearts	-	4	6	Hearts
10	8	8	20-100	-	2	3	Acorns/Bells/Leaves
11	9	4+4+1	Ulti Four Aces	2	-	3	Acorns/Bells/Leaves
12	10	8+2	Four Aces of Hearts	4	4	6	Hearts
13	10	8+2	Ulti of Hearts	4	-	6	Hearts
14	10	4+6	40-100 Durchmars	-	2	-	Acorns/Bells/Leaves
14	10	4+6	Ulti Durchmars	-	-	-	Acorns/Bells/Leaves
15	10	10	Rebetli / Betli of Hearts^{*}	-	-	-	-
16	12	4+4+4	40-100 Ulti Four Aces	-	-	3	Acorns/Bells/Leaves
17	12	8+4	20-100 Four Aces	-	2	3	Acorns/Bells/Leaves
18	12	8+4	20-100 Ulti	-	-	3	Acorns/Bells/Leaves
19	12	12	Plain Redurchmars	-	-	-	-
19	12	12	Durchmars of Hearts	-	4	-	Hearts
19	12	12	Open Durchmars	-	2	-	Acorns/Bells/Leaves
20	14	4+4+6	40-100 Ulti Durchmars	-	-	-	Acorns/Bells/Leaves
21	14	8+6	20-100 Durchmars	-	2	-	Acorns/Bells/Leaves
22	16	8+4+4	20-100 Ulti Four Aces	-	-	3	Acorns/Bells/Leaves
23	16	8+8	40-100 Four Aces of Hearts	-	4	6	Hearts
23	16	8+8	40-100 Ulti of Hearts	-	-	6	Hearts
23	16	4+12	40-100 Open Durchmars	-	2	-	Acorns/Bells/Leaves
23	16	4+12	Ulti Open Durchmars	-	-	-	Acorns/Bells/Leaves
24	16	16	20-100 of Hearts	-	4	6	Hearts
25	18	8+8+2	Ulti Four Aces of Hearts	4	-	6	Hearts
26	18	8+4+6	20-100 Ulti Durchmars	-	-	-	Acorns/Bells/Leaves
27	20	4+4+12	40-100 Ulti Open Durchmars	-	-	-	Acorns/Bells/Leaves
28	20	8+12	40-100 Durchmars of Hearts	-	4	-	Hearts
28	20	8+12	Ulti Durchmars of Hearts	-	-	-	Hearts
28	20	8+12	20-100 Open Durchmars	-	2	-	Acorns/Bells/Leaves
29	20	20	Open Betli	-	-	-	-
30	24	8+8+8	40-100 Ulti Four Aces of Hearts	-	-	6	Hearts
31	24	8+4+12	20-100 Ulti Open Durchmars	-	-	-	Acorns/Bells/Leaves
32	24	16+8	20-100 Four Aces of Hearts	-	4	6	Hearts
33	24	16+8	20-100 Ulti of Hearts	-	-	6	Hearts
34	24	24	Open Durchmars of Hearts	-	-	-	Hearts
34	24	24	Plain Open Durchmars	-	-	-	-
35	28	8+8+12	40-100 Ulti Durchmars of Hearts	-	-	-	Hearts
36	28	16+12	20-100 Durchmars of Hearts	-	4	-	Hearts
37	32	16+8+8	20-100 Ulti Four Aces of Hearts	-	-	6	Hearts
38	32	8+24	40-100 Open Durchmars of Hearts	-	4	-	Hearts
38	32	8+24	Ulti Open Durchmars of Hearts	-	-	-	Hearts
39	36	16+8+12	20-100 Ulti Durchmars of Hearts	-	-	-	Hearts
40	40	8+8+24	40-100 Ulti Open Durchmars of Hearts	-	-	-	Hearts
41	40	16+24	20-100 Open Durchmars of Hearts	-	4	-	Hearts
42	48	16+8+24	20-100 Ulti Open Durchmars of Hearts	-	-	-	Hearts

* The names Rebetli and Betli of Hearts are both commonly used; however, the latter suggests a trump suit despite Betli being a no-trump bet. The misleading suffix merely points to the fact that the bet is double value and its use is advised against.

=== Auction ===
The auction is conducted in an unusual way which is virtually unique to Ulti. The player on the right of the dealer gets two extra cards. They are obliged to select two cards from their hand, place them face down on the table without showing them, and make a bid. The two facedown cards are called the talon.

Thereafter, each player may pass or else pick up the talon and bid. Passing does not prevent the calling player from bidding again. The calling player may pick up the talon again if the other two players pass. A player who takes the talon must make a higher bid than the previous one, then lay any two cards face down on the table to re-form the talon. This continues until all players pass (including the highest bidder) after which the calling player announces the trump unless the game is "plain" or "Hearts", and the other two players become the defending team. Card points in the talon count against the calling player whenever the simple game's score is involved. All doubling takes place after the end of bidding and before the end of the first trick.

In a specific variation of the game, bidding takes place in two rounds. In the first round, each player gets five cards. The player on the right of the dealer bids first with all other players entitled to bid, counter-clockwise. They should either pass or announce a higher bid, keeping in mind that the value of all bids (and doubles) are twice as high in the first round as normally. Whichever player wins the first-round auction gets two extra cards from the dealer, then each player - beginning from the player on the right of the dealer - gets five more cards. The player who won the first round of the auction selects two cards and places them face down, confirming their first-round bid or raising it, but with the same trump suit and the multiplier reduced to one. After this, bidding continues like in the normal game.

It should be stressed that in this version the winning bid from the first round (including its value) remains valid in the second round, until someone else (or the caller themselves) announces a higher bid.

=== Doubling ===
Doubling takes place at the beginning of the game, after the bidding is over and ends when the second trick has been led. Doubles multiply their appropriate components by factors of 2. Only the team opposed to the team which doubled the last time can call a double, which may go on infinitely. All components that are doubled must be stated the moment a player doubles. Doubles are binding to both defenders, except if a defender is doubling no-trump components against the soloist, where only this defender is bound to the double. If no doubling has taken place yet, only the defenders can initiate it. Below is the list of the most common doubling names.

Double	Calling team	Multiplier
Double	Defenders	×2
Redouble	Soloist	×4
Surdouble	Defenders	×8
Morddouble	Soloist	×16
Hirschdouble	Defenders	×32
Fedák Sári	Soloist	×64
Wheeled Bicycle	Defenders	×128

Note that it is very uncommon for a doubling to go higher than redouble, and therefore certain high level doubles such as "Fedák Sári" and "Wheeled Bicycle" have names spontaneously invented by the players which later became famous. The doubling can go higher than 128, but in this case doubles don't have fixed names; in the very rare case the doubling does go higher than 128, players use any imaginary name which first comes to their minds as the name for the double.

=== Play ===
The calling player leads to the first trick, and the winner of each trick leads to the next. Suit must be followed, and if possible, the played card must be of higher value than what it is in the current trick. If following the suit is not possible, trump must be played. If neither playing the lead suit, nor playing trump is possible, any card may be played. The player who plays the highest card (any trump is higher than any card of any other suit) wins the trick and leads the next trick.

In a trump game, any player having a marriage to declare must do so upon playing to the first trick, or the marriage cannot be claimed later. All marriages called by the defending team count towards their collective score. In a hundred-game, the calling player may declare only the marriage whose value they stated when bidding.

In an Ulti game, the calling player may not lead or play the Seven of trumps before the last trick, unless forced by the rules of play.

=== Scoring ===
For winning, the calling player receives the stated amount from each opponent; for losing, they pay it to each opponent, therefore when the calling player wins, each member of the defending team loses one unit of points, totaling two units gained for the calling player; but when losing, the calling player loses two units of their points, one to each opponent. If written scores are kept, it is sufficient to add or subtract the value from the calling player's points alone but recommended to note all players' scores.

In Hungary, the game is usually played with real bets, but because the smallest value coin in the country is 5 forints, the game is played with a unit of 10 forints per point. In this case, points are not kept on paper; instead, money is paid after each game.

=== Silent bids ===
Silent bid	Applied in bids of	Winning conditions	Losing conditions	Single value
Silent 100	Simple, Ulti, Four Aces	The calling player ends the game with a score of at least 100.	The defending team ends the game with a score of at least 100.	2
Silent Four Aces	Simple, 40-100, Ulti, 20-100	The calling player wins all tricks in which Aces are played.	One player of the defending team wins all tricks in which Aces are played.	2
Silent Ulti	Simple, 40-100, Four Aces, 20-100	The calling player wins the last trick with the Seven of trumps.	The defending team wins the last trick where the calling player plays the Seven of trumps.	2
Silent Durch	Simple, 40-100, Ulti, 20-100	The calling player wins all tricks.	One player of the defending team wins all tricks.	3 (Simple 4)

When the winning conditions are fulfilled, the defending team loses the value of the silent bid, double if the trump is Hearts (per player). When the losing conditions are fulfilled, the calling player loses double the value of the silent bid, quadruple if the trump is Hearts. Silent bids are doubled along with their appropriate games that carry this bid.

== See also ==
- Bezique
- Sedma
