= Tarabish =

Canadian card game, originating in Cape Breton Island

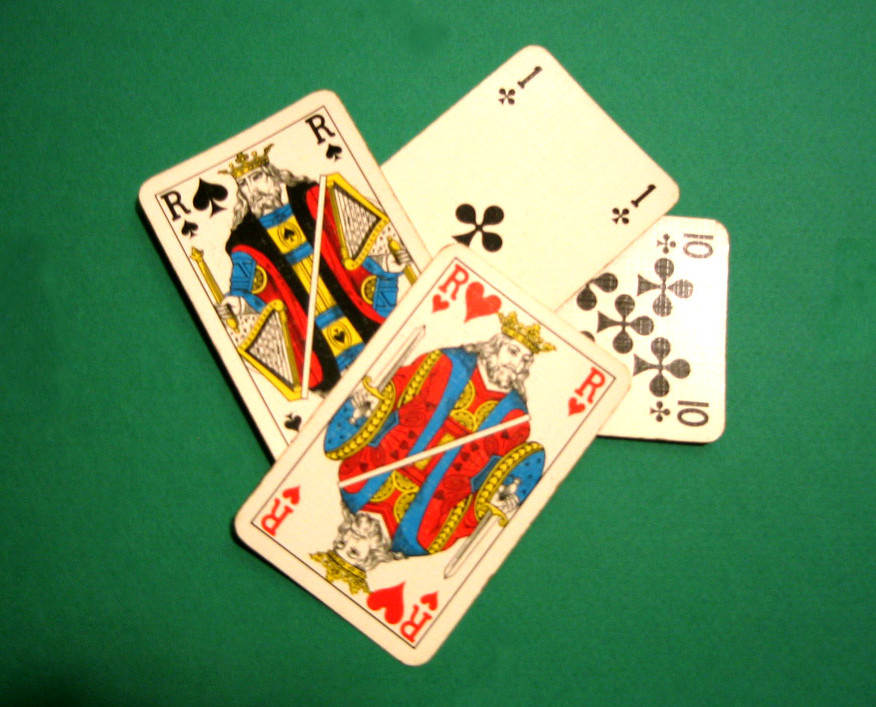
- Origin: Canada
- Type: Trick-taking
- Players: 4
- Cards: 36
- Deck: French-suited English pattern
- Rank (high→low): J 9 A 10 K Q 8 7 6 (trump); A 10 K Q J 9 8 7 6 (suit)
- Play: Clockwise
- Playing time: 20 min.
- Chance: Medium

Related games
- Belote

Tarabish, also known by its slang term bish, is a Canadian trick-taking card game of complex rules derived from belote, a game of the Jass family. The name is pronounced "tar-bish", despite the spelling. It is played primarily by the people of Cape Breton, Nova Scotia, in Canada, where, according to one source, it was brought in 1901 by a Lebanese immigrant George Shebib. On the other hand, following comprehensive research Kennedy (1996) states that opinions as to its origin vary and that no "definitive roots may ever be determined."

== Object ==
The game is over when one or both teams accumulate 500 points or more. Points are counted at the end of each hand and both teams always count their points. The team with the most points at the end of the game wins.

=== The deck ===
A tarabish deck consists of a normal English pattern deck of playing cards with the 2 through 5 of each suit removed. In preparation for the hand the dealer shuffles the cards in the usual manner. When finished the person to the right of the dealer cuts the cards. The cutter must leave at least four cards in each portion of the deck. Once the cards have been cut, no further shuffling is allowed. Bespoke tarabish packs were produced by Ocean of Sydney, Nova Scotia in the 1970s. These contained 40 cards (6–A in each suit) together with a rules leaflet.

The 36 tarabish cards are dealt in groups of three beginning with eldest hand (the player to the left of the dealer) and proceeding clockwise until all the cards are dealt. The four players look at their first six cards; the last three, called the kitty, remain face down until after the auction is over and a trump suit has been chosen.

=== Cards value ===
In the plain suits, cards rank and score in the standard ace–ten order; in the trump suit the Jack and Nine are promoted above the ace to become the highest two cards with correspondingly higher card point values.

Card values
Plain Suit Rank			A	10	K	Q	J	9	8	7	6
Value	20	14	11	10	4	3	2	0	0	0	0
Trump Suit Rank	J	9	A	10	K	Q			8	7	6

=== The bid ===
There is an auction to determine the trump suit for the hand. Eldest hand opens the bidding to choose the trump suit. If eldest passes, the decision passes to the next person and so on. In the most popular variation, if the bid reaches the dealer, the dealer is forced to choose a trump suit. The less popular variation allows the dealer to pass in which case the hand is complete and the deal passes to the next player.

The team that 'goes' must accumulate more than half of the points for that hand. If they get fewer than half, it is a 'bait' or 'bate' (Note: This may come from the French term bête since the Lebanon was once French.) and their points go to their opponents. If they get exactly half the points it is a 'half-bait' in which case they score zero while their opponents of course get to score their own points.

=== The play ===
Play begins with eldest hand and proceeds clockwise until each player has played a card. Each player must follow suit by playing a card of the same suit as the first card of each trick. A player who does not have a card of the same suit must play a trump if able. Lacking both, a player may play any card. Players must always head the trick if possible, i.e. on playing a trump they must overtrump any trumps already played. The person who played the highest card to the trick collects the cards and leads to the next trick.

It is important collect tricks neatly as they may need to be referred to in the event of a misplay. Completed tricks must be kept face down. A player may suspend play at any time and ask to see the last completed trick but none before it. Once a trick is turned over it is considered complete.

=== Misplay ===
Failure to comply with the aforegoing rules is called a 'misplay (or reneg)'. A player who suspects someone has 'misplayed (re-negged)' may stop the hand by verbally saying 'misplay (or reneg)'. It is verified by examining the over-turned tricks and identifying the trick where the misplay is believed to have occurred.

If a team is successful in proving the 'misplay', that team then receives all points from the hand that the 'misplay' occurred in. However, if they wrongly announce a 'misplay', the opponents receive all the points for that hand.

As an example, suppose the king of trumps is played and the second player plays a 6 of trumps to the trick. If later, the second player plays the 9 of trumps, an observant tarabish player will realize that someone did not 'play to beat' the 'trump king' during the opening trick. It's at this time the observant player can then call a "misplay' (also referred to as 'renegging').

At any time a player may throw his cards and forfeit the points that have been played.

=== Scoring ===
Upon completion of each hand, teams count the points in their winning tricks to determine the scores. Base score for a hand is 162 points, before any runs or "Bella" is counted. This is derived from 62 points in trump values, 90 points in non trump values, and 10 points for taking the last trick.

The calling team must be able to score at least one more than half the points available (82 by default), otherwise all points are awarded to the opposition. This is known as "going bait".

The highest possible score for a team in 1 hand is 282 (2 "50's" and Bella) since only the highest straight is counted, but a single player can have more than 1 straight if their hand contains the highest straight among players.

=== Runs ===
There are two types of runs. Runs in Tarabish are according to the customary card rank as in Poker (6, 7, 8, 9, 10, J, Q, K, A). So the three best trumps (J, 9, A) do not make a run.

- A twenty is a run of three cards in a row of the same suit. (e.g. 6, 7, 8 of hearts or 9, 10, J of clubs)
- A fifty is a run similar to a twenty however it is a run of four cards in a row. If a player happen to have 5 or 6 cards in a row it is still just a fifty and the extra cards are in no way significant when comparing to other runs.
- A player with a run must announce to the other players that they have a run before they play their first card. A player must show his or her run immediately before playing their second card.

One player can have multiple runs, but only one player can count runs in a hand. If more than one player announces a run, the player with the "best" run according to the following will get to count all of their runs. If a player has multiple runs, their best run is used for the following comparison:

- A fifty always beats a twenty.
- When comparing two runs of the same size, the one with the highest rank is best.
- A run in trumps beats a run of the same size and rank in non-trumps.
- Two runs of the same size and rank in non-trumps cancel each other out. In this case no one counts their runs even if one player has multiple runs. If a player announces a run, but fails to show it before the play of their second card, the run is not counted. A popular version suggests that if a player called a fifty but forgets to show it, before the third card is played, a twenty can be shown and counted, but only other players.

=== Bella ===
Bella (or Bells) is when a player has a king and queen of the trump suit in the same hand and is worth an additional 20 points when called. The player MUST call bella when playing the last of the 2 cards to get the points. Common practice allows to instead call the first of the bells rather than the last. This is advantageous in remembering to call it, but gives others information about one's hand and may be detrimental in giving away points if going bait.

- Official rules state that calling "first of bells" is table-talk and an automatic forfeiture of points since it is telling one's partner of another guaranteed trump held in the hand.

In the event that bella is part of a valid run, the player has the option to announce "Bella" when they show their run or wait until played.

== Tarabish terms ==
- Bait - The team which "calls" trump and fails to accumulate at least one point more than half the points available. See bête
- Half bait - The team which "calls" trump accumulates exactly half the available points. The calling team receives a score of zero, the non-calling team receives full credit for their score (1/2 of the total score of the hand).
- Bella - When a player has the King and Queen of trump in a single hand.
- Run - Three or four cards in sequence in the same suit.
- Twenty - A run of three cards.
- Fifty - A run of four cards.
- Misplay or renege - When a player doesn't follow the lead suit, or doesn't beat trump when he can. If a misplay is called against a team, all the points go to the team who called the misplay. See renege.
- Last - Final trick earning an additional 10 points to the winning team.
- Kitty - The three cards that are hidden to a player until after a trump is called.
- Playing to beat - If at any time a player is forced to play a trump, he must beat the best trump card on the table.
- Linganer - A 3-card run consisting of 6-7-8, named after the former 876 Lingan Coal Mine.
- Johnny and the nerf - The jack and 9 of trump, respectively. (Note: "nerf" from French neuf i.e. nine.)
- 50 with the bells - Calling and showing a 3 or 4-card run that includes the king and queen of trump (bella). In more informal circumstances, can be called 50 with the nuts and sluts.
- Dry ten - When a player has only the 10 in a suit, after being dealt their cards
- Forced - A popular variation. If a team has over 400 points, that team is forced to call trump. Therefore, they are not allowed to pass trump call to the dealer if the dealer is on the opposite team. If both teams are over 400 points, the team with the higher points is 'forced'.

== See also ==
- Baloot
- Belote
- Clabber
- Klaberjass
- Jass
- Klaverjas
- Pilotta
- Tarneeb
- Twenty-eight

== Bibliography ==
- MachEachern, J. Y. Tarabish: How The Game Is Played. Sydney, Nova Scotia: Sea-Cape Music. ISBN 9780969220831
