= Marriage group =

Card game

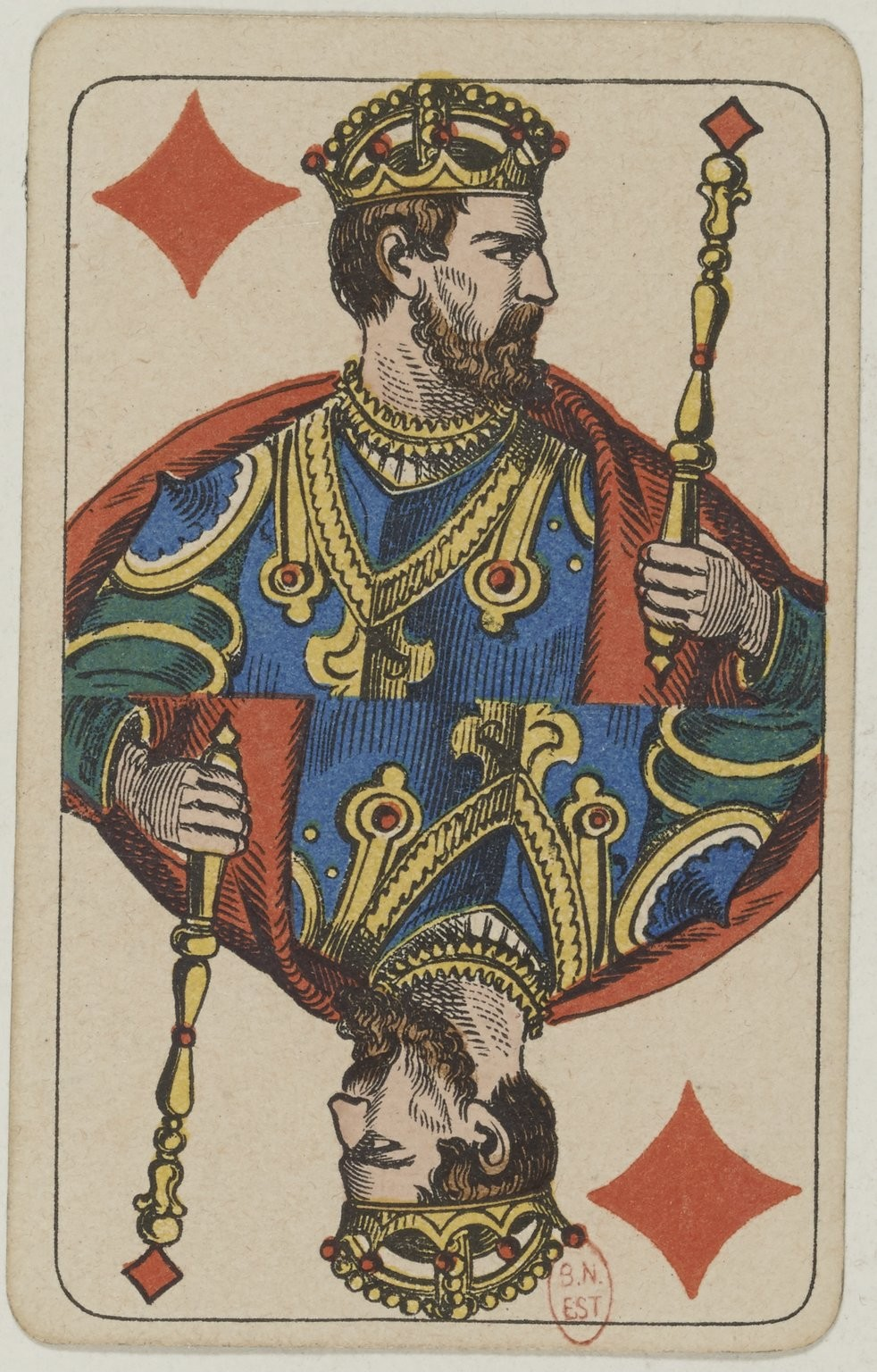
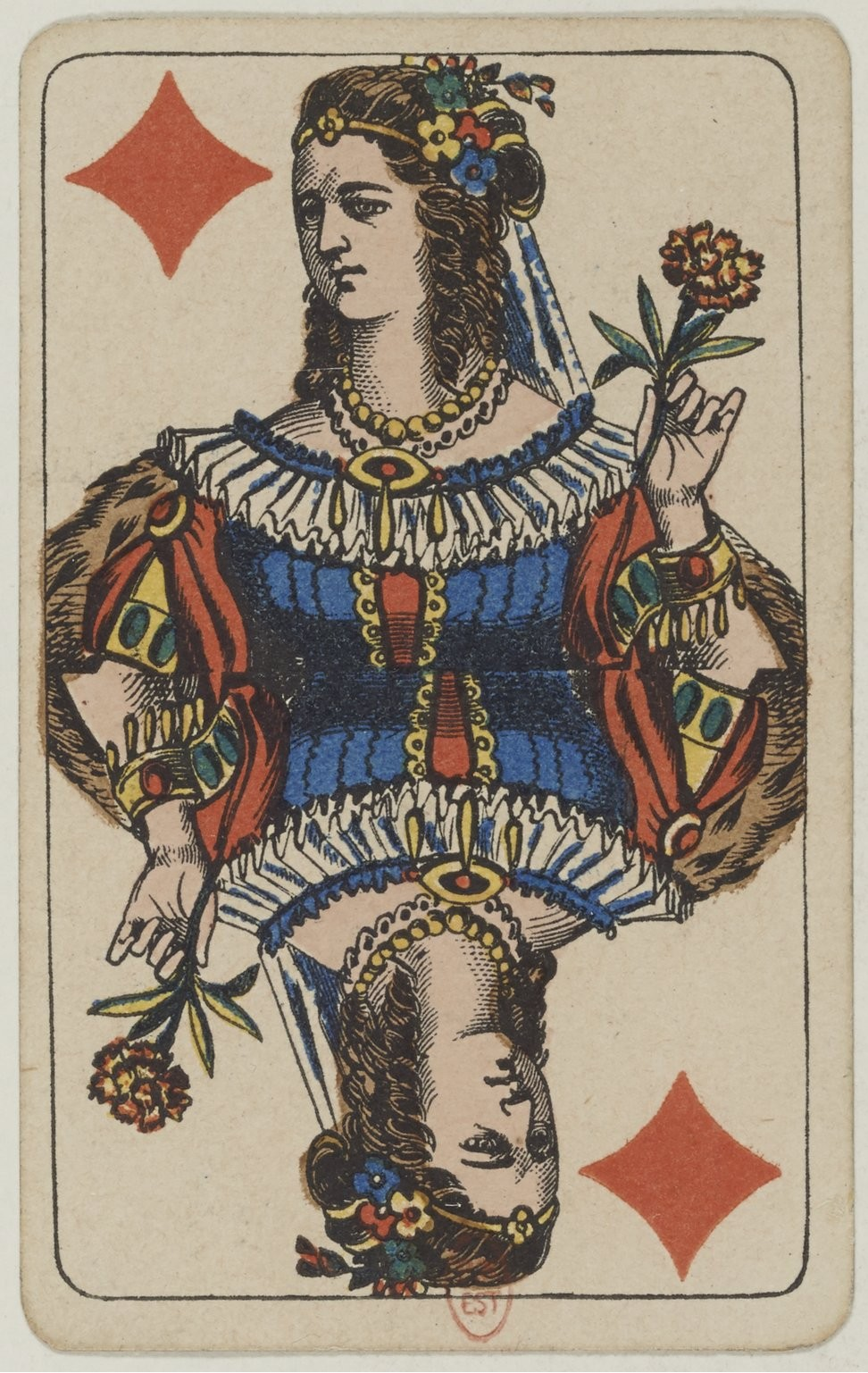
A 'marriage' of king and queen

The Marriage group is a large family of point-trick card games in which the 'marriage' of two cards, usually a king and queen, plays an important role and attracts a bonus. They are believed to be descended from a German game, Mariagenspiel or Mariage, which dates back to at least 1715. Well-known games in this group include bezique and the national card games of Austria (Schnapsen), Czechia (Mariáš), Hungary (ulti), France (belote), Switzerland (Jass) and the Netherlands (klaverjas).

== Description ==
Mariagenspiel (German for mariage game, using the original French word for marriage rather than the German word, Heiraten) is the earliest and most typical representative of the group. It was first described in a 1715 ladies' encyclopedia printed in Leipzig. The game's entry said that the game was popular among ladies, and the entry for playing card listed Mariage first among nine card games played with the German pack. Despite the marriage theme, the Queen was replaced by the equivalent male character in the German cards. Apart from the standard queen/Ober, jack/Unter translation, the game was described precisely as detailed at Mariage.

Games in this family are typically played by 2–4 players using a pack of 20–40 cards, with aces and tens scoring 11 and 10 points in tricks, respectively, and marriages scoring 40 points in trumps and 20 points in a plain suit.

An elaborated form of Mariagenspiel known under various names including Klaberjass and Bela is especially popular among Jewish communities and spread worldwide. Its offshoots form the Jass group, or jack–nine card games, characterized by the fact that the jack and nine of the trump suit are the highest trumps.

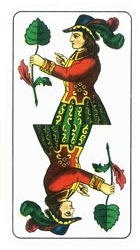
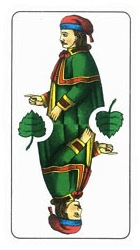
A 'pair' of the Ober and Unter of leaves

According to David Parlett, the modern German/Austrian variant of Mariagenspiel, sixty-six, which remains close to the original, is "one of the best two-handers ever devised". The "marriage" theme seems to have originated in France in the context of unrelated card games. Two-handed Schnapsen and three-handed Mariáš and Ulti are the most popular card games in the area of the former Austro-Hungarian Empire. Klaberjass, first documented in the Low Countries as a Jewish game, developed into Dutch Klaverjas, Swiss Jass and French Belote. Bezique and its variants, Binokel and Pinochle, are further examples of popular games in the King–Queen or marriage family.

The Marriage group is further subdivided into three:

- King–queen games are the largest group in which the marriage of a king and queen (or pairing of a king and Ober) attract a bonus
- Queen–jack games in which there is a special bonus for a certain combinations of queen and jack (or Ober and Unter)
- Jack–nine games, in which the trump jack and nine are the top trumps.

== Jack–nine games ==
In this subfamily, the jack ("Jass") and nine (the "manille", meaning second-higher trump) of the trump suit are the highest trumps. Games in this family are typically played by four players with the 32 French-suited cards of a piquet pack.

The family contains the closely related French (belote, belote contrée) and Dutch (klaverjas) national card games. The Swiss national card game (Jass) is also a close relative but features a number of peculiarities, has spawned numerous variants, and is played with 36 cards. The popular South Asian card games twenty-eight and twenty-nine are derivatives of this family and share many of its characteristics.

The earliest known games of this family were two-handed, such as Klaberjass (also known as Bela) which is still played worldwide

== See also ==
- Ace–ten game
