= Darda =

Darda can refer to:

- Rajendra Darda, Indian politician
- Vijay J. Darda, Indian politician
- Darda, Croatia, a village and a municipality in eastern Croatia
- Darda (toy), a car racing set made in Germany
- Tatteln, a card game closely related to Klabberjass, also known as Darda or Dardeln
- Darda Turki, a village in the Tonk district of Rajasthan
