= Baloot =

Arabian card game

- بلوت
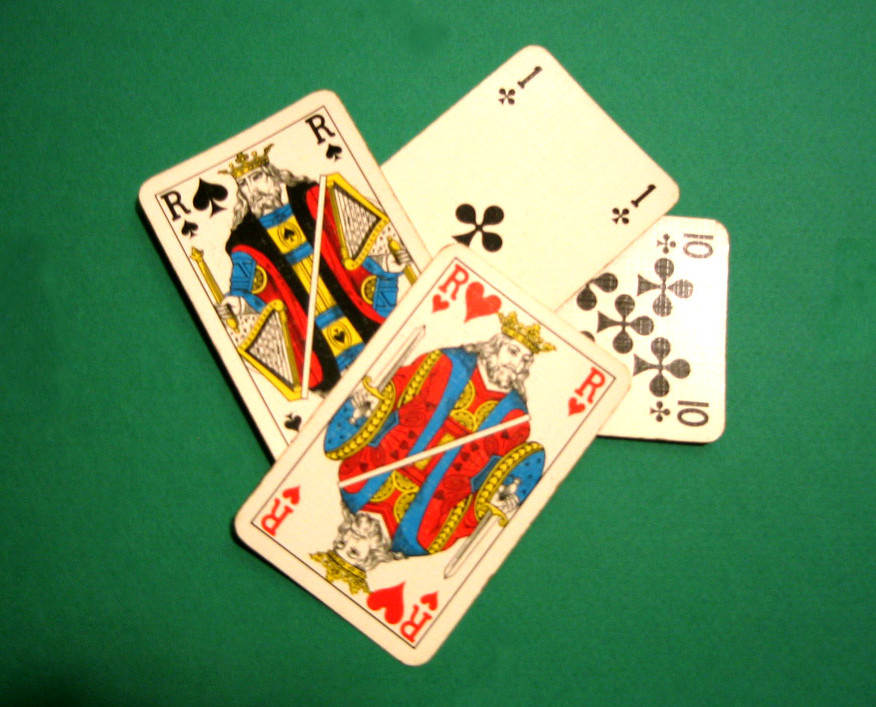
- Origin: Hejaz
- Type: Trick-taking
- Players: 4
- Skills: Skilful
- Cards: 32
- Deck: French-suited Piquet pack (or short 52-card pack)
- Play: Counter-clockwise

Related games
- Belote

Baloot (Arabic: بلوت, romanized: balūt), is a popular trick card game played in the Arabian Peninsula, which is similar to the French game Belote.

== The game ==
There are four players in partnerships of two teams. A standard 32-card Piquet pack is used, eight for each player. There are two contracts: Hokum and Sun (from the French sans). The card ranking is:

=== Sun (suit) ===
	8	7	6	5	4	3	2	1
Clubs:	7 of clubs	8 of clubs	9 of clubs	Jack of clubs	Queen of clubs	King of clubs	10 of clubs	Ace of clubs
Diamonds:	7 of diamonds	8 of diamonds	9 of diamonds	Jack of diamonds	Queen of diamonds	King of diamonds	10 of diamonds	Ace of diamonds
Hearts:	7 of hearts	8 of hearts	9 of hearts	Jack of hearts	Queen of hearts	King of hearts	10 of hearts	Ace of hearts
Spades:	7 of spades	8 of spades	9 of spades	Jack of spades	Queen of spades	King of spades	10 of spades	Ace of spades

=== Hokom (Trump) ===
Assume the Hokom suit is the Sherya (Clubs) ♣ (for example)

	8	7	6	5	4	3	2	1
Clubs:	7 of clubs	8 of clubs	Queen of clubs	King of clubs	10 of clubs	Ace of clubs	9 of clubs	Jack of clubs
Diamonds:	7 of diamonds	8 of diamonds	9 of diamonds	Jack of diamonds	Queen of diamonds	King of diamonds	10 of diamonds	Ace of diamonds
Hearts:	7 of hearts	8 of hearts	9 of hearts	Jack of hearts	Queen of hearts	King of hearts	10 of hearts	Ace of hearts
Spades:	7 of spades	8 of spades	9 of spades	Jack of spades	Queen of spades	King of spades	10 of spades	Ace of spades

== Starting the game ==
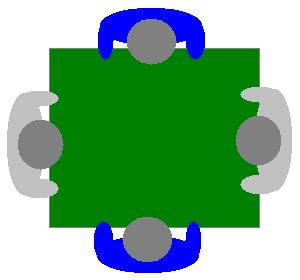
Baloot seating arrangement.

The two members of each team are seated across each other at a table in such a way that no player can see the cards of other players .

The first dealer is chosen at random and after each hand the turn to deal passes to the right. The cards are shuffled by the dealer, and cut by the player on the left. The player on the left of the dealer can either say "go" without cutting the deck, shuffling it (just once), take the first card as the public card, can give the bottom three cards to the teammate or keep them for themselves, or take the top three cards to themselves. If the dealer gives a player a card and was mistakenly flipped, the player has no right to refuse it, unless it is an Ace, then the shuffling starts again from the same dealer.

The dealer has 32 cards; he has to deal them to the other players starting from his right three cards at a time, e.g. 3 cards to the right player, 3 cards to the front player, etc., then two cards at a time, then finally one card shown to public . The dealer is now in charge. He calls " First," which means the first round of taking the public card, players "buy" the public card, priority goes to the player on the right of the dealer, then the front player (teammate) and then the player on the left, the person with the least priority to take the card is the dealer. Players should say "no" if they don't want the card; this goes counterclockwise.

If someone takes the card, as (for example) Hokom, any player has the right to refuse and take it as Sun. But if the person took the public card as Sun, then only the person with the higher priority can take the card.

"Ashkal", it is said when a player doesn't want the public card, but wants it for their teammate, just to receive 3 cards instead of 2. note: only the dealer and the player to the left of the dealer have the right to call Ashkal. If a player calls Ashkal where they do not have the privilege, the player is forced to take the public card as Sun. If the card was an ace, the player has no right to say Ashkal, if they do, they are forced to buy it as Sun.

If a player has only zero cards - 7, 8 or 9 of any suit, he may choose to force everyone to abandon this turn with no points to any team (Kawesh/Saneen), where he buys the public card as Sun, and lies his cards face up (If he feels he has an advantage he may still buy the card normally). However, in "Second" the player may not ask for this turn to be abandoned.

If all the players choose to not take the card, then the dealer calls, "Second", which means there is another chance in taking the card. If someone takes it as Sun, then no one else can buy it over them even if they were of a higher priority. That is a significant advantage of buying Sun in the second round over the first; that no one else can take it from you even if they were of a higher priority. They lose that right by saying no in the second round. But if someone takes it as Hokom, then the Hokom must be something different from the suit of the public card because it is on the second mode. Other players can take the card as Sun. The player that takes it as Hokom, has the option to choose between three suits before lifting up the two cards that the dealer just gave. Or it is Sun if the player lifts up the two cards before naming a suit for Hokom. There is not "Ashkal" in the second round.

After someone takes the public card. The dealer continues giving other cards to the players, again starting to the right, counter clock-wise, 3 cards to each but 2 cards to the player who has taken the public card.

== Playing ==
The Player on the right side of the Dealer starts the round. Players counterclockwise must follow suit if they can; a player who has no cards of the suit led can play any card. Or he/she should play one of the Judges cards in case of Hokom rounds. each trick score should be added to the total scores until one of the team reaches the 152 points and win the game. (see Scores section below)

In case of Hokom, if the first leading card played Hokom, other players should throw the Hokom card, if or example the card played was a King of hearts and the Hokom is hearts, the next player should surrender a card that is bigger in value of the King.

== Scoring ==
Once a round is over, the score of each team should be added to the total score .Each card has a score rank as the following:

Note: The team that takes the last trick always add 10 to their score before calculating round score.

=== In case of Sǔn rounds ===
- Score = score + Zero
- Score = score + Zero
- Score = score + Zero
- Score = score + 2
- Score = score + 3
- Score = score + 4
- Score = score + 10
- Score = score + 11
- Round score = score (to the nearest 10) then divide over 10 then x 2
- Total score = Round score + total rounds scores

=== In case of Hokom rounds ===
Regular Cards

- Score = score + Zero
- Score = score + Zero
- Score = score + Zero
- Score = score + 2
- Score = score + 3
- Score = score + 4
- Score = score + 10
- Score = score + 11

Trump Cards

- Score = score + Zero
- Score = score + Zero
- Score = score + 3
- Score = score + 4
- Score = score + 10
- Score = score + 11
- Score = score + 14
- Score = score + 20
- Round score = score (to nearest 10) then divide by 10 then x 1
- Total score = Round score + total rounds scores

== Game bonuses ==
Bonuses are free extra points one of the two teams can earn during a Round. Bonuses also called Projects (Arabic: مشروع). Projects (except for Baloot) are always declared in the first turn and shown in the second turn.

There are several types of bonuses in Baloot. The following list describes each of them starting from the minimum .

=== Sira (Single line) ===
A player declaration Sira, means that he has a 3 serial cards, according to Global cards sorting (A, K, Q, J, 10, 9, 8, 7). for example:

- or
- or any other 3 serial cards.

Bonus:

- Round score = Round score + 4 (in Sǔn)or
- Round score = Round score + 2 (in Hokom)

=== 50 ===
A player declaration 50, means that he has a 4 serial cards, according to Global cards sorting.

- or any other 4 serial cards.

Bonus:

- Round score = Round score + 10 (in Sǔn) or
- Round score = Round score + 5 (in Hokom)

=== 100 ===
A player declaration 100, means one of the three positions:

- 1- The player has five cards in a row in the same suit, according to Global cards sorting.
- or any other 5 serial cards.
- 2- The player has four Jacks, Queens, Kings or tens.
- 3- The player has four aces.
- , this is only in case of Hokom because in Sǔn rounds 4 aces means 400.

Bonus:

- Round score = Round score + 20 (in Sǔn) or
- Round score = Round score + 10 (in Hokom)

=== 400 ===
A player declaration 400, means that he has 4 aces.

- , this is only in case of Sǔn because in Hokom rounds 4 aces means 100.

Bonus:

- Round score = Round score + 40 (in Sǔn only)

=== Baloot ===
A player declaration Baloot, means that he has the King and the Queen cards of the Judges suit, for example:

The Judges cards of Hokom round are Clubs and a player has:

Bonus:

- Round score = Round score + 2 (in Hokom only)

Notes:

- If two player from different teams, have different projects, only the player with the higher project can show the project and get points for it. 400 > 100 (serial) > 100 (4 of a kind) > 50 > Sira. Only exception is Baloot, which can count.
- If players from different teams has the same level project (e.g.: Two Sira's) Only the one with the highest card can show the project and get points for it.
- Baloot is not declared in the first turn, Baloot is declared when you play the second card of the project. (e.g.: on the first trick you played the king of the judges suit.. two tricks later you're going to play the queen of the judges suit, before you play it you say "Bloot")
- If one (not both) of the Baloot cards is in another project, the Baloot can't be declared. and If both Baloot cards are in a "100" Project, Baloot can not be declared. They still can be declared in "Sira" or "50".
- In Double, Three and Four, Projects are calculated X2, X3, X4 receptively. (See "Multiple scores" below.) (Except for "Baloot", which is always 2).
- If one player of a team gets to show their project that entitles their teammate to show their project too. That is why if many projects are declared, it is wise to wait for everyone to say what is their highest card, and see if you can show your project or not.
- If a player has higher project than the player before them, but forgets to show it, the other player has the right to show their project before they play their third card.
- No card can be in two different projects (Except for both Baloot cards in "Sira" or "50").

=== Multiple scores ===
While naming the round by one of the teams, the other team may keep silence or say Double (locked or open), the one who bought the card (and only they) can raise to Triple. Then the one who said double (and only they) can raise it further Four. Here the buyer can raise it to the limit by saying Gahwa. (Sun can only go up to double, and only when only 1 team has more than 100 points. If both teams are above 100 or below it, Sun can not be doubled).

By saying Double, the competition will be harder because the round scores will be twice as much as the normal round. The Three means 3 times as much as the normal round and Four means four. The main purposes of saying "Double or Four" is to change the way of playing and increase points, since when the game is doubled (or more) points aren't divided, the team with most points takes all. If you were playing in "locked" "Double or Four", the one who says "Double" or "Four" has the option of locking or opening the Hokom. In case it's locked you can't use the Judged suit as a first card in any trick, you can only use them when you don't have the suit that the other player has played, or don't have any other suit to play as a first card in the trick. Otherwise, "if its Three or Gahwa" you can use any suit you want, even if it was the Judged suit.

The Gahwa challenge will end the whole game at once for the round winner.

=== Probability of game bonuses ===
Projects (Arabic: مشروع)	Frequency	Probability	Odds	Mathematical expression of probability
Ace of clubs Ace of hearts Ace of spades Ace of diamonds	1	0.195%	514:1	$\frac{\frac{\binom{28}{4}}{4!}}{\binom{32}{8}}$
10 of clubs Jack of clubs Queen of clubs King of clubs Ace of clubs Queen of hearts Queen of spades Queen of diamonds	20	1.224%	82:1	$\frac{\frac{16 * \binom{27}{3}}{3!} + \frac{4 * \binom{28}{4}}{4!} }{\binom{32}{8}}$
10 of clubs Jack of clubs Queen of clubs King of clubs	20	3.45%	29:1	$\frac{\frac{20 * \binom{28}{4}}{4!} - \frac{16 * \binom{27}{3}}{3!} }{\binom{32}{8}}$
Jack of clubs Queen of clubs King of clubs	24	23.20%	4:1	$\frac{\frac{24 * \binom{29}{5}}{5!} - \frac{20 * \binom{28}{4}}{4!} }{\binom{32}{8}}$

== See also ==
- Pilotta
- Tarabish
- Klaverjas
- Tarneeb
