= Coinche =

Card game

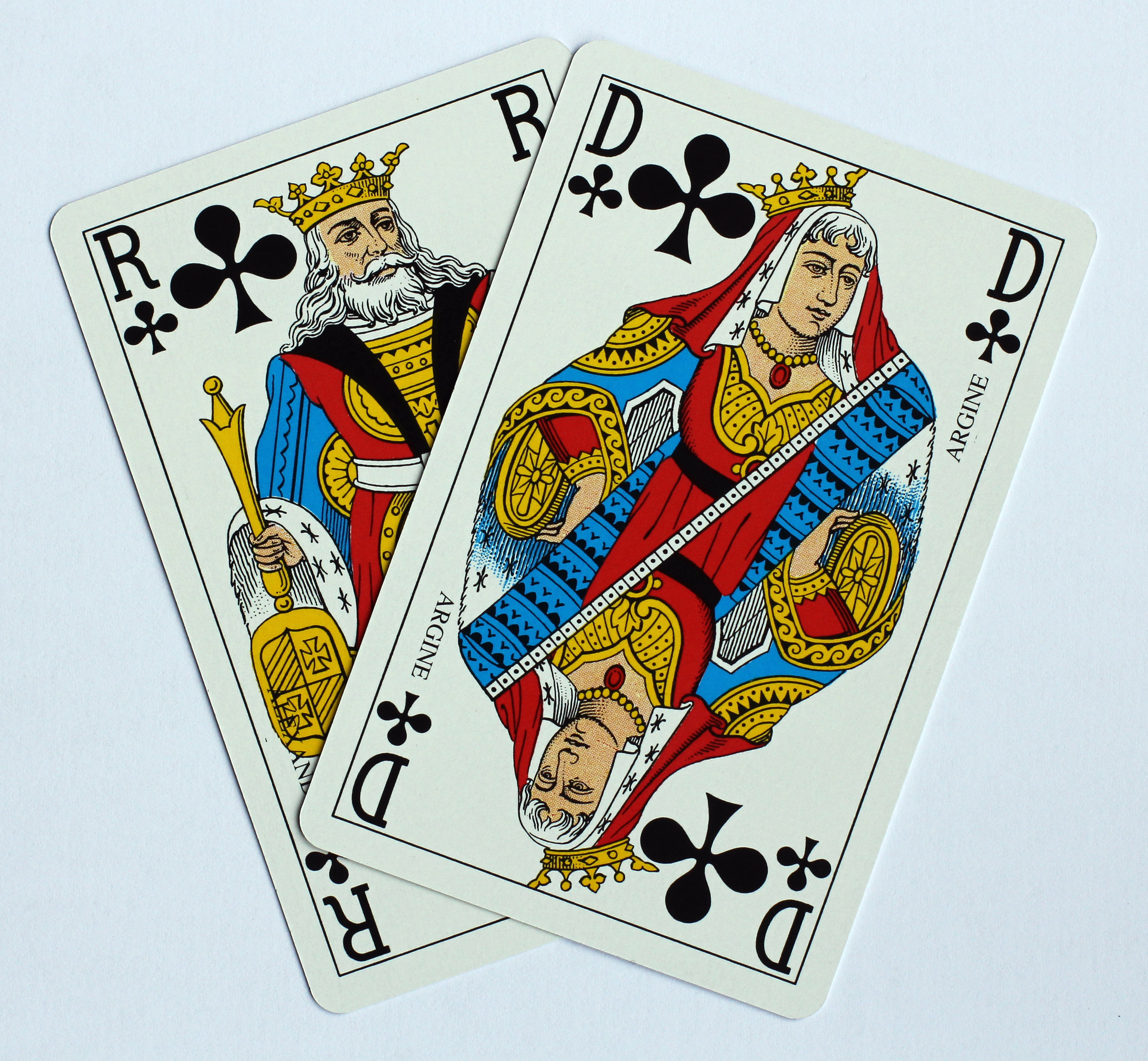
- A Belote of Clubs
- Origin: France
- Type: Trick-taking
- Players: 2-4
- Skills: Skillful
- Age range: 8-80
- Cards: 32
- Deck: Piquet deck
- Rank (high→low): A 10 K Q J 9 8 7 (Suit); J 9 A 10 K Q 8 7 (Trump)
- Play: Counter-clockwise
- Playing time: 30 min.

Related games
- Belote, Klaverjas, Jass

Coinche (French pronunciation: [kwɛ̃ʃ]), also called belote coinchée (IPA: [bəlɔt kwɛ̃ʃe]), is a variant of the French belote. The rules of the game are the same, but all cards are dealt and the trump suit is chosen in bridge-like bidding instead of being random. There are two additional contracts possible: no trump (sans atout) and, usually, all trumps (tout atut).

Like most popular games, coinche rules may differ from a geographic area to another.

== Rules ==
=== Dealing ===
The deck is never shuffled, but rather cut by the player who precedes the dealer, except for the first dealing in a game when the dealer's partner does that. The first dealing in a game is done by the winners from the previous game. At least three cards must be cut. The cards are dealt counter-clockwise starting from the dealer's successor (to his/her right), each player receives three packets of cards, two of them count three cards and the other two cards. The order in which the packets are dealt is not specified, it could be (3,2,3), (2,3,3) or (3,3,2).

=== Bidding ===
The player at the right of the dealer starts the biddings, the goal here is to choose the trumps.

Each player can:

- Pass (it does not prevent him from bidding later with the exception if everyone passes);
- Make a contract including a card suit and the number of point he must do, for example: 100 Clubs.

Card Suits are the same as in belote:

- Hearts
- Diamonds
- Clubs
- Spades

All trumps and No trumps are added.

Bidding's start at least at 82 points (shortened to a bid/call of 80), and are made by steps of 10 (80, 90, 100, ...). If a contract has already been made by another player, the new contract must be at least 10 points higher. If a player believes that their team can win all the tricks, then an additional bid of "capot" can be called. If any trick is lost, the game is automatically lost regardless of the points made. If a "capot" is successful, 250 points are awarded.

An important rule of the game is the possibility of "coincher": when player A makes a bid, if the opposing team believes that player A's team will not be successful, either player in the opposing team can say "coinché" this can be called at any time, and by either player in the team. Similarly, if players A team believe that players Bs' team coincher will be unsuccessful, they can call a surcoinche resulting in the final score being quadrupled.

Biddings end by one of those 3 cases:

- every player in a row passed (one player can not bid higher than himself except if he changes the suit);
- one player has "surcoinchéd".
- A capot is called

=== Play ===
Play is the same as in ordinary belote. In all trumps players must always play a higher card if possible unless the partner is winning the trick.

=== Card Value ===
The rank and points attributed to each card in coinche differs between the trumps and the remaining suits, summarized below:

Order and value of cards in coinche
trump		non-trump		no trump		all trumps	
card	value	card	value	card	value	card	value
J	20	A	11	A	19	J	14
9	14	10	10	10	10	9	9
A	11	K	4	K	4	A	6
10	10	Q	3	Q	3	10	5
K	4	J	2	J	2	K	3
Q	3	9	0	9	0	Q	1
8	0	8	0	8	0	8	0
7	0	7	0	7	0	7	0

=== Regional Variants ===
Each region tweaks the rules in a non negligible fashion.

=== Saint-Étienne's region variant ===
The key differences are:

- when dealing, only distribute six cards total, three at a time.
- the bidding takes place with only six cards, the rest (two cards per person) is dealt after the bidding is over in one round
- you cannot play all trumps

== Bibliography ==
- "Les règles de la Coinche". Belote.
