= Klob =

Klob may refer to:

- Klob (card game), alternative name for the card game of clabber
- KLOB, a local radio station in California
