= Terts =

Terts (rus. терц) is a popular in Ukraine point-trick taking card game for 2 players. The game is an archaic, relatively primitive version of Klabberjass. There is no bidding. Instead, there are 2 phases. In the first phase players replenish their hands with cards from the stock.

In Ukraine the game is considered favourite card game of high-ranking criminal convicts.

== History ==
Players of Terts believe the game originates at French card game Bezique. It was created in 19th century by prisoners sent to katorga in Siberia and Sakhalin. The game has remained popular in the milieu of convicts and is considered favourite card game of high-ranking criminal prisoners.

== Rules ==
=== Cards ===
The game is played with 32 cards from aces to 7s. Order and value is typical for jass games. Cards in non-trump suits are ranked as follows (from the highest):

- A, 10, K, Q, J, 9, 8, 7.

In trump suit jack and 9 of trumps are promoted to highest trumps:

- J, 9, A, 10, K, Q, 8, 7.

Value of cards slightly differs from the typical one in jass games:

Trump suit		Non-trump	
Card	Value	Card	Value
J	20	A	11
9	13	10	10
A	11	K	3
10	10	Q	2
K	3	J	1
Q	2	9	0
8	0	8	0
7	0	7	0

Last trick is worth additional 10 pts. which gives 150 pts. total in cards.

=== Deal ===
9 cards are dealt to 2 players. 19th card is revealed and put under the deck. Its color designates the trump suit for the rest of the deal.

=== Breaking the deck ===
The winner of the first trick says to his opponent "break" (ru. ломай). Then his opponent takes the deck, splits into two parts, puts the botton one on the top one; puts the deck on the table and covers with the trump card. Henceforth the players will draw a card from the bottom of the deck.

=== Play ===
Play resembles that in 66. Opponent of the dealer leads first. There are 2 phases: once the stock is not depleted and when it's depleted. In the first phase, after every trick, players draw a card from the bottom of the stock beginning with the winner of the trick. Until the stock is not depleted there is no need to follow suit or trump when unable.

When the stock is depleted players need to follow suit or play a trump, when unable. Besides, players need to always try to take the trick when possible, i.e. they need to play a higher card if possible both in trumps and in non-trump suit. Hence the play is more restrictive than in most variants of Klabberjass. There is only exception from the aforementioned rules: the jack of trumps can be kept till the last trick - a player doesn't need to play it even if the opponent played a trump and the player has only the jack of trumps.

=== Declarations ===
Declarations in Terts play an important role as there are multiple occasions to declare them and players can hope for collecting them. Some of them are also very valuable. They are:

1) Four of a kind:

- 4 jacks = 200 pts.,
- 4 queens, kings or aces = 100 pts.

2) Sequences:

- Sequence of 3 cards (terts) = 20 pts.,
- Sequence of 4 cards (fifty) = 50 pts.,
- Sequence of 5 or more cards = 100 pts.

3) Pair of the king and the queen in the same suit (marriage) = 20 pts.

Four of a kind beats sequences. Longer sequence beats shorter one. Only the player with higher declaration scores points for it. Players can announce a declation when leading to a trick, but only after breaking the deck. They can declare only 1 declaration every trick. The last moment for declaring is first trick of the second phase. The only exception is marriage which can be declared and scored at every point.

=== Scoring ===
The game ends when someone collects 501 pts. When a player took at least 501 pts. can announce it and win the game, but he must take at least 1 trick. The game is also played to 301 pts. (Short terts).

== See also ==
- Tatteln

== Bibliography ==
- Моряк (23 July 2021). "Терц — любимая карточная игра тюремной аристократии / Правила игры в Терц". Фокусы от Моряка.
