= Jassen =

Jassen may refer to:

- Jass, Switzerland's national card game also called Jassen
- Jassen Cullimore
