= Clobber (disambiguation) =

Clobber may refer to:

- Clobber, an abstract strategy game
- Clobber (cards), a trick based card game
- Clobbering, a computer term for overwriting (often accidentally)
  - also in pottery, a term for fraudulently added decoration
- Clobber (aircraft), the NATO code name for Yakovlev Yak-42 aircraft

== See also ==
- Clobber Girl, the superhero identity of Lisa Simpson
