= Belote =

Card game

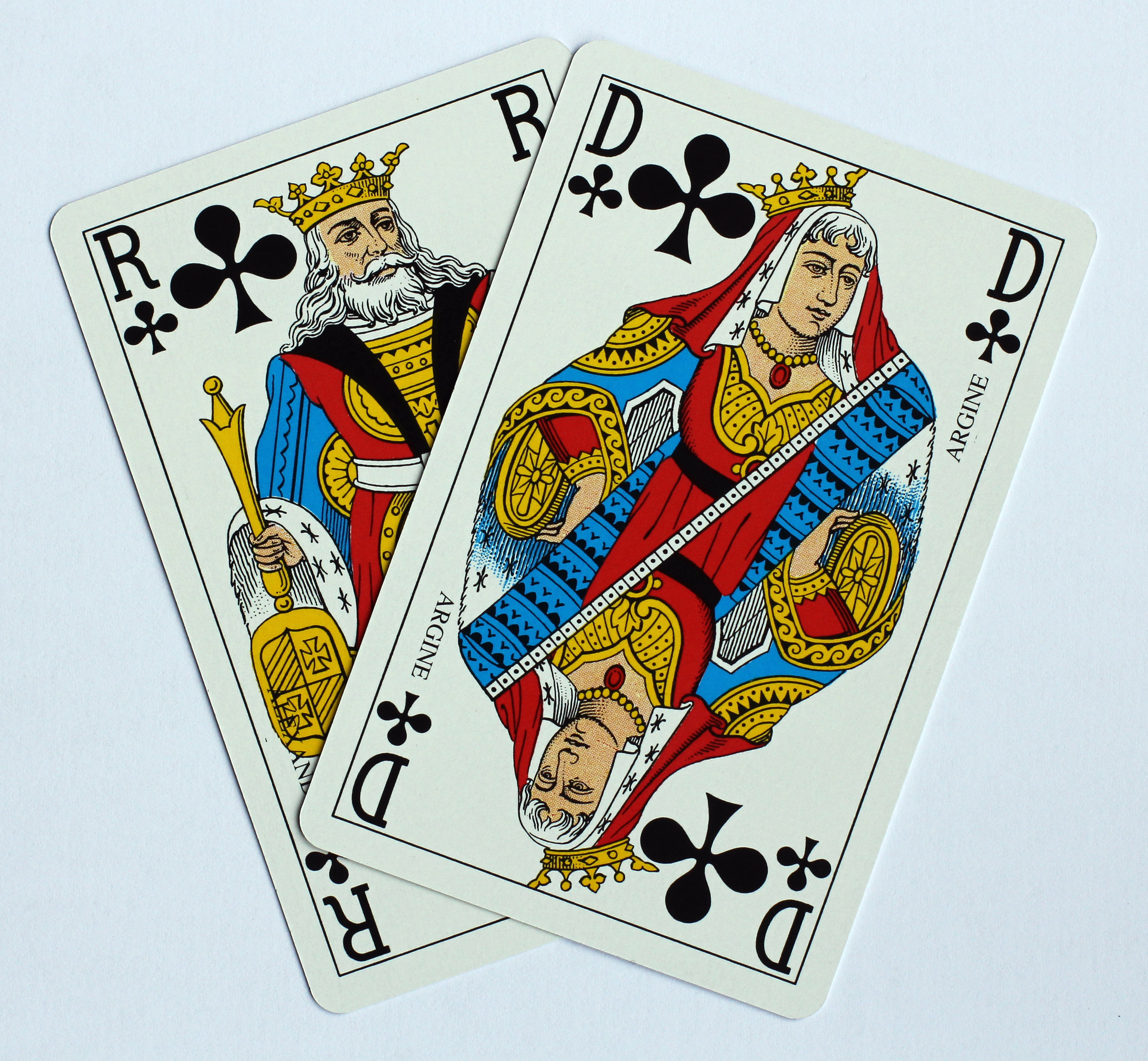
- A belote of clubs
- Origin: France
- Type: Trick-taking
- Players: 4
- Skills: Card counting, strategy
- Age range: 8-80
- Cards: 32
- Deck: Piquet deck
- Rank (high→low): J 9 A 10 K Q 8 7 (Trump); A 10 K Q J 9 8 7 (Suit)
- Playing time: 30 min - 45 min.

Related games
- Klaberjass, klaverjas, Jass, coinche, Tatteln or Franzefuß

Belote (French pronunciation: [bəlɔt]) is a 32-card, trick-taking game for 4 players popular in France. It is considered the national card game of France, played both casually and in gambling. The game belongs to the jass family characterized by the jack and nine of trump being the strongest trumps.

It appeared around 1900 in France, and is a close relative of both Klaberjass (also known as bela) and klaverjas. Closely related games are played throughout the world. Definitive rules of the game were first published in French in 1921.

Within the game's terminology, belote is used to designate a pair of a king and a queen of a trump suit, possibly yielding the game's name itself.

Similar games are played in central Europe, Saudi Arabia (baloot) and in Cyprus (pilotta).

== Rules ==
=== Set up ===
The game is played by 4 players in fixed partnerships with 32-card deck (from ace to 7). Partners sit opposite each other. The game consists of

- dealing,
- 1 or 2 rounds of bidding,
- play with melding and
- scoring.

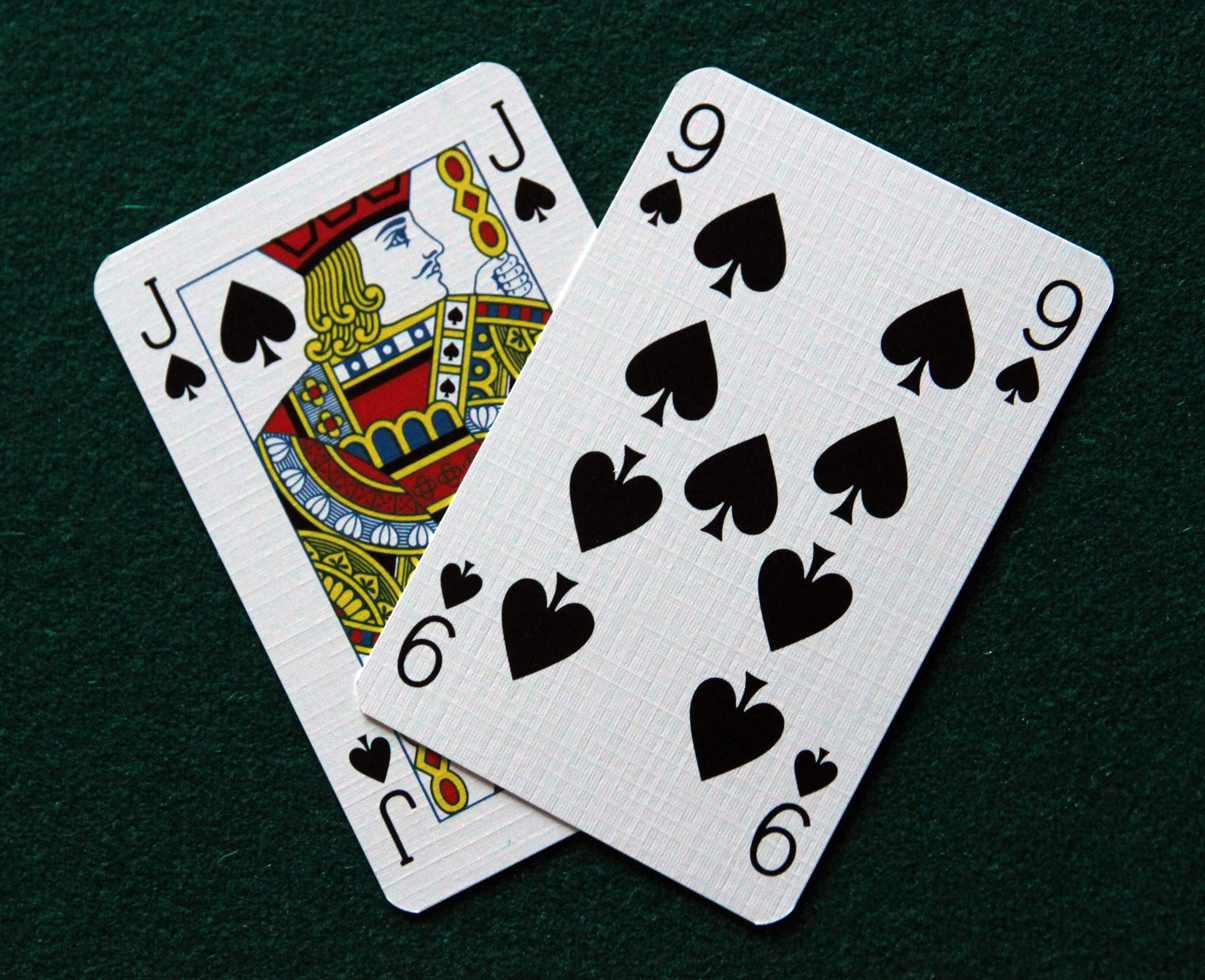
Jack and nine - highest trumps in belote.

In every deal one suit is trump. Order of seniority in trumps is as follows (from the highest):

J, 9, A, 10, K, Q, 8, 7.

Order of seniority in other suits is as follows (from the highest):

A, 10, K, Q, J, 9, 8, 7.

The game focuses on taking tricks and valuable cards. Value of cards is shown in the following table.

Values of cards in belote
Trump		Non-trump suit	
Card	Value	Card	Value
J	20	A	11
9	14	10	10
A	11	K	4
10	10	Q	3
K	4	J	2
Q	3	9	0
8	0	8	0
7	0	7	0

Additionally the last trick is worth 10 points. It sums up to 162 points possible to get in tricks. There are also points possible to get for certain combinations of cards (declarations).

=== Dealing ===
5 cards are dealt to every player in batches of 3 and 2. One undealt card is uncovered. There are one or two rounds of bidding afterwards. The bidding will determine a declarer. The rest of the cards remain temporarily face-down. If a contract is agreed upon, the remaining cards are dealt after the bidding – a group of three for each player except the declarer who got the card that was in the middle, who gets two.

=== Bidding ===
Bidding consists of two rounds. In the first round every player, beginning with the one sitting to the left of the dealer, is asked whether they take the card and accept its suit as trump. Players can take the card and become a declarer or pass. If all players pass, there is a second round. Again each player is asked whether they takes the card and becomes a declarer. This time players can choose any trump but the suit of the uncovered card. The dealer can choose any suit as trump.

=== Play ===
The play consists of eight tricks, the first one being started by the dealer's successor. The first player in a round can play any card, but subsequent players must obey the following rules:

1. The led suit must be followed.
2. If the led suit is a trump suit, a higher-ranking card (if available) must be played regardless of who is currently winning the trick.
3. If the led suit is not a trump suit and it cannot be followed, a trump suit card must be played (so called trumping) unless partner is currently winning the trick.
4. If a player cannot follow a non-trump suit and an opponent played a trump and is currently winning the trick, the player must play a higher trump if possible (so called overtrumping). If he doesn't have a higher trump, but still has trumps, he must play a lower trump despite he can't win the trick (so called undertrumping). If the partner is currently winning the trick, the player doesn't need to play a trump.

The winner of a trick starts the next trick. The last trick is a bit more significant, as its winner is awarded 10 points. This is called Dix de Der.

=== Declarations ===
Declarations (melding), except belote, must be announced during the first trick:

sequences:

- a sequence of 3 cards (tierce) - 20 pts.,
- a sequence of 4 cards (quarte) - 50 pts.,
- a sequence of 5 cards (quinte) - 100 pts.,

four of a kind (carré):

- 4 jacks - 200 pts.,
- 4 nines - 150 pts.,
- 4 aces, tens, kings or queens - 100 pts (sevens and eights are not awarded),

belote:

- pair of the king and the queen in the trump suit - 20 pts.

Sequences are in the "A K Q J 10 9 8 7" order of the same suit.

It is sufficient to specify the type of a declaration (one of the above), whereas the exact suit or ranks are not required. A card can participate in at most one declaration.

Belote must be declared when the first card from the pair is played (not necessarily during the first round). Players usually declare rebelote when playing the second card from the pair. Only the pair that declared the highest meld scores points for melds with the exception of belote-rebelote which is always scored.

=== Scoring ===
If the declarers took at least as many points as the defenders, then both teams score their points taken. If the declarers failed to do so, they score nothing, and the defenders score both their points and the points taken by the declarers.

If the declarers took all the tricks, they score 100 pts. instead of 10 pts. of Dix de Der, giving 252 pts. This is called Capot.

The winner is the team that first scores 1000 pts.

== Variants ==
=== Belote coinche ===
Belote coinche or simply coinche is a variant of belote with bridge-like bidding added. All cards are dealt. Players bid for the right to name trump suit by number of points to be taken and suit. Bidding starts with 80. Besides trumps, players can also bid no trump (sans atout) where order of cards is

A 10 K Q J 9 8 7

in all suits and frequently, depending on rulseset, all trumps (tout atut), where order of seniority is

J 9 A 10 K Q 8 7

in all suits. In all trumps a player must always play a higher card whenever possible.

To keep the sum of points equal to 152 (162 with the last trick) in no trump and all trumps the values of cards in these contracts are modified according the following table:

Order and value of cards in no trump (sans atout) and all trumps (tout atut)
No trump		All trumps	
Card	Value	Card	Value
A	19	J	14
10	10	9	9
K	4	A	6
Q	3	10	5
J	2	K	3
9	0	Q	1
8	0	8	0
7	0	7	0

Contracts can be doubled (coinche) and redoubled (surcoinche). Unlike in bridge, coinche ends bidding. It can be followed only by a surcoinche. A contract is made successfully if the declarers took at least as many points as they bid. If the contract is made, the declarers score the points taken plus their bid while the defenders score the points they took. If the contract wasn't made, the defenders score 160 pts plus the declarers' bid, whereas the daclarers score nothing but 20 pts for belote.

=== Belote contrée ===
Belote contrée is another variant of belote, very similar to coinche. It differs in that there are no no trump and all trumps contracts. Double is called contrée or contre, redouble is called surcontrée or surcontre. Belote contrée is also usually played without declarations other than belote-rebelote.

== Worldwide variants ==
- Quebec: Bœuf
- Bulgaria: Бридж-белот, Bridge-belote
- Greece: Βίδα, Vida; Μπουρλότ, Bourlot
- Cyprus: Πιλόττα, Pilotta
- Croatia: Bela or Belot
- North Macedonia: Бељот, Beljot
- Armenia: Բազար բլոտ, Bazaar belote
- Arabian Peninsula: بلوت, Baloot
- Russia: Белот, Belot
- Tunisia: Belote
- Morocco: Belote
- Moldova: Belot
- Madagascar: Tsiroanomandidy or Beloty
- Netherlands: Klaverjassen

== See also ==
- Bellot
- Clabber
- Manille
- Marjolet
- Preferans
- Twenty-eight
- Tarabish

== Bibliography ==
- "Belote". Pagat.
- "Les règles de la Coinche". Belote.
- "Les règles de la Contrée". Belote.
- "Les règles de la Belote contrée : Astuces et stratégies pour remporter le jeu en équipe". Vip Belote.
