= Pilotta =

Card game played in Cyprus

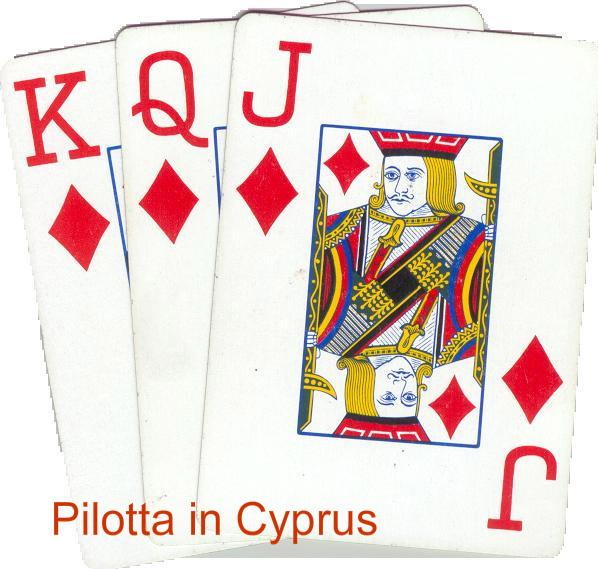
- Origin: Cyprus
- Type: Trick-taking
- Players: 4
- Cards: 32
- Deck: French
- Rank (high→low): A 10 K Q J 9 8 7
- Play: Counter-Clockwise
- Playing time: 25 min.

Related games
- Bid whist, Belote

Pilotta (in Greek Πιλόττα) is a trick-taking 32-card game derived from Belote. It is played primarily in Cyprus, being very popular among the Cypriot population, especially the youngsters, who usually arrange “pilotta meetings” in places such as cafés and cafeterias. Its counterpart played in Greece is named Vida (in Greek βίδα).

== Rules ==
=== Declaring the dealer ===
First, the 32-card Piquet pack is shuffled by the dealer and then cut by the player to the left. The cutter is assigned hearts ♥ and moving on anticlockwise the players are assigned a suit in the order: ♥ > ♦ > ♣ > ♠. If the suit which made the cut is hearts, for example, then the player who shuffled and cut the deck will be the dealer. If it was spades, then the person on the left of the shuffler is the dealer.

At the end of each turn, the player on dealer's left becomes the new dealer.

=== Deal ===
The cards are dealt anticlockwise; first, 3 cards are given to each player, starting with eldest hand (on the dealer's right) and ending with the dealer himself. Then, another 2 cards are dealt, and then another 3.

=== Bidding ===
Starting with eldest hand, players bid on the score they expect to gain. The player with the highest bid is eligible to decide the trumps for the game. Bidding is typically performed in increments of 10, with the lowest opening bid being 80.

There is a more recent variation to the game known as Pilotta Palaristi, which reintroduces a point-based bidding system.

=== Playing ===
The player who bids first in the bidding round is the one who leads. The leader may play any card. The next player has to follow suit if possible. If the player cannot follow suit, a trump card must be played. If s/he hasn't any trump card, any other card can be played. If a trump card is played the other 3 players are required to play a higher trump if they have any.

Each player plays a card and the one with the highest rank wins them all. Every trump wins any non-trump. The rank of trumps from highest to lowest is given by J 9 A 10 K Q 8 7 while the rank of non-trumps is given by A 10 K Q J 9 8 7.

=== Scoring ===
Usually the score ends when the first team reaches 351 points. In some cases, the limit can go up to 400 points if the players want to pursue a "lengthy" game, or correspondingly lowered to 251 and even 151 points if they are in a hurry, or just want to finish quickly.

Usually one of the four players is responsible to keep the score for the whole game for the two teams.

== Bonus declarations ==
In Pilotta there are some specific rules of play when it comes to scoring bonuses, called 'declarations' (Greek: δηλώσεις). Below are all of the possible bonus-earning declarations (from lowest to highest):

- Three in a row (20 points): this can be either 7,8,9 (of diamonds ♦ for example) and it gives 20 points.
- Belote (20 points): If the players holds the King and the Queen of the suit which has been declared as the leading suit, i.e. trumps, then he immediately score 20 extra points (When a player holds the Belote, nobody can deny him those extra 20 points, even if the opponent holds four Jacks, and even if the opponent makes a Capot©. Also, the player can declare the Belote whenever he melds it, not at the start of the first round as all of the others.)
- Four in a row (50 points): the same as having 7,8,9 with the only difference that the player need to also hold the 10 to complete four in a row, which scores 50 points.
- Five in a row (100 points): Holding 5 cards of the same suit in a row scores 100 points.
- Four of a kind (100 points): If the player is holding four Aces (A), four Kings (K), four Queens (Q) or four Tens (10), he immediately scores 100 points.
- Four nines (150 points): This is a special case; Nines give 150 points if the players holds all four nines.
- Four jacks (200 points): This is a special case; Jacks give 200 points if the player holds all four of them.

Holding three cards in a row scores the same points (20) as if one had an Ace, a King and the Queen of the same suit, with the only difference that the sequence with the Ace is stronger than the one holding the 9 and would 'beat' the opponents' hand, therefore cancelling their 20 points and making the Ace's sequence the only valid one between the two.

Declarations must be spoken on the first turn (the game has 8 turns, or tricks) and shown on the second trick, just before the player plays his card. If he decides to show the cards (for example four Aces) just after he has played his card, then immediately the points are not counted.

== See also ==
- Klaverjas
- Whist
- Prefa
- Coinche (the closest version of Pilotta)
