= Clabber =

Card game originating in Indiana, United States

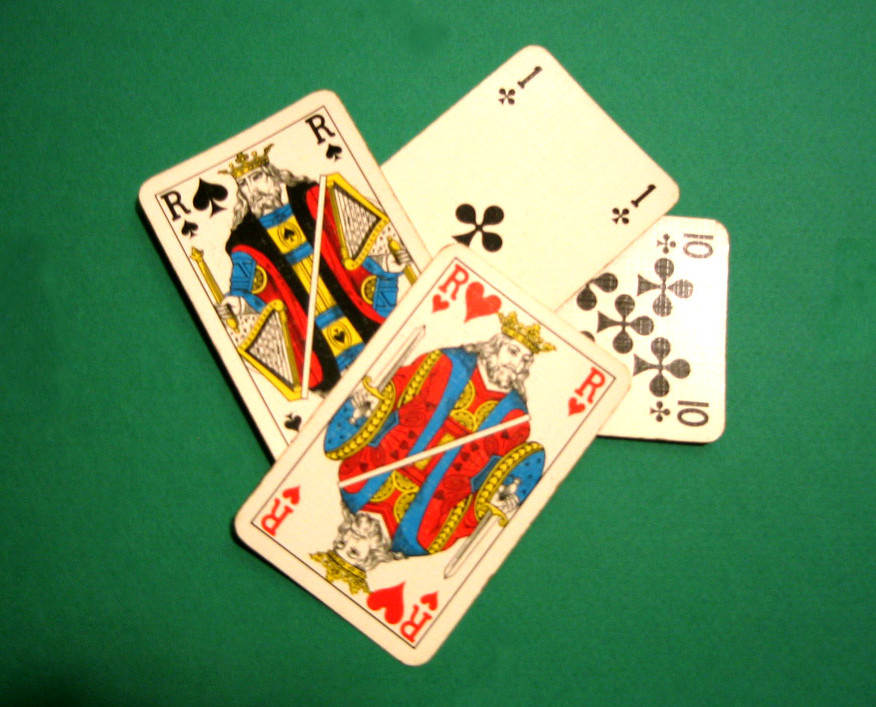
- Origin: Evansville, Indiana
- Type: Trick-taking
- Players: 4
- Skills: Memory, tactics
- Cards: 24
- Deck: French
- Rank (high→low): A 10 K Q J 9 J 9 A 10 K Q (trump)
- Play: Clockwise
- Playing time: 25 minutes
- Chance: Medium

Related games
- Klaverjas Belote

Clabber is a four-player card game played in southwestern Indiana near Evansville. It is a member of the Jack–nine family of point-trick card games that are popular in Europe and is similar to Klaberjass. The trump makers must score at least eighty-two points to keep from "going set", where they do not score any of their points. Additional points can also be scored for a combination of cards in a hand, which would assist in "making it", or, not going set.

The game is sometimes known as klob, clob, clobber or dad.

== Definitions ==
- Bella: A meld consisting of the king and queen of trumps. (In slang, sometimes called "Beller".)
- Dad: A meld consisting of three cards of the same suit and in sequence; worth twenty (20) points. The sequence is: 9, 10, J, Q, K, A
- 40 dollar dad: A dad that contains Bell, i.e., Q, K, A or J, Q, K of trump suit; worth forty (40) points.
- Fifty: A meld consisting of four cards of the same suit and in sequence; worth fifty (50) points.
- Hundred: A meld consisting of five, or six cards of the same suit and in sequence; worth one hundred (100) points. Also, 4 of a kind, i.e., four nines, aces, kings, queens. ""Note"" that having the sixth card offers no additional points over that of five cards.
- Meld: A sequence of cards (at least 3) that are of the same suit.
- Pass: After the deal, the act of declining the turned-up card as trumps.
- “Play it”: After the deal. the act of accepting the turned-up card as trumps.
- Renege: A violation of the rules of the game.
- Sequence: Used in connection with meld. The sequence follows the non-trump suits as follows: 9, 10, J, Q, K, A
- Set: Failure of the trump making team to score more points than that of the opponents. (If no meld is involved, the team declaring trumps must score at least 82 points to avoid “set”).
- "The mules" or two mundred or the four boys: A meld consisting of the four jacks.

== Objective ==
As each card has a point value, in each hand, to win tricks and score points (Trick-points) that outscore opponents. Meld is added to the trick points to win. The team scoring 500 points first wins the game. If both teams score 500, the team with the most points win. If there is a tie at/over 500, a new hand is played to determine winner.

== History ==
The origin of the game, as played in Evansville, and surrounding areas, has not yet been established with any certainty. Some lend its beginnings with the European game Klaberjass, while others have said it was brought to the Evansville Ohio River banks by African-American steamboat workers.

Clabber, as played locally, dates back to at least 1896, when several articles were printed in the local newspaper referring to private games. One such article referred to it as "a negro card game". A newspaper article was later published in 1931 indicating the game being played by at least 1881, and possibly as early as 1871 on an Ohio River steamboat by Black workers in Evansville. The article mentions a game played by Black trustees at Evansville police headquarters in 1891.

In 1931 Walter Schlang was noted as serving as President of the Evansville Clabber Club

In 1935, Leo Bruttrum, Secretary of the Evansville Clabber Club, and his clubmates formed the first known written rules for the game. Prior to this time, the game was played by different rules depending on the venue. Mr. Buttrum wrote to the United States Playing Card Company only to be told that they had no information on such a game. However, the company suggested that Mr. Buttrum, and his club, draft some rules, and send them in to the company for publishing in the updated version of Hoyle, "Hoyle-Up-To-Date". The Evansville Clabber Club copyrighted the name of the game as "Evansville Clabber", and is listed as such in that edition of Hoyle.

During WWII, many of the manufacturing plants, such as Servel, Republic Aviation and others began challenging each other to games, and in 1944, the Evansville Clabber League was formed by Servel Inc., Bucyrus-Erie, the Order of Owls, Order of Eagles, Order of Moose, West Side Sportsmans Club, Germania Maennerchor and Knights of Columbus. One long time Clabber champion was Elbert D. Mackey. To this day, John Esche and Tyler Hilgeman are known as the two best clabber players ever.

== Players and cards ==
Clabber is played by four players in fixed partnerships with partners sitting opposite (on tables where the length is longer than the width, players arrange themselves around the table, two on each side, with partners sitting diagonally opposite one another). Cards are dealt, from left to right (or clockwise), to opponent then partner, opponent to dealer. The deck consist of 24 of the standard 52 playing card deck: ace, king, queen, jack, ten, and nine of each of the suits. The card ranks from high to low, and their values are as follows:

Trump	Points	Non-trump	Points	Melds
Jack	20	Ace	11	Ace
Nine	14	Ten	10	King
Ace	11	King	4	Queen
Ten	10	Queen	3	Jack
King	4	Jack	2	Ten
Queen	3	Nine	0	Nine

The team that takes the last trick scores an extra 10 points, so that, without melds, there are a total of 162 possible points. In the trump suit the jack and nine move from the lowest rank to the highest rank, and are the only cards to change in point value.

== Meld ==
A meld is a scoring combination of cards in the hand of a player. The rank and point values of possible melds are:

Meld	Description	Points
"Two Hundred", a.k.a. "The Mules" a.k.a. "The Four Boys"	Four jacks	200
"Hundred"	Four nines	100
"Hundred"	Four aces	100
"Hundred"	Fours tens	100
"Hundred"	Four kings	100
"Hundred"	Four queens	100
"Hundred"	Sequence of five in one suit	100
"Fifty"	Sequence of four in one suit	50
"Dad"	Sequence of three in one suit	20
"Bell"	King and queen of trump	20

== Play ==
The deck is shuffled by the dealer, and offered to the player to the right who must cut the deck with at least four cards in each stack. The dealer then deals all the cards clockwise, one at a time, with every player receiving six cards. The last card, which is part of the dealer's hand, is turned face up in front of the dealer. After the hand has been played, the turn to deal passes to the left.

=== Declaring trump ===
Declaring trump is the part of the game that determines the trump suit. The team that makes the trump suit must score more points than their opponent, including melds, or score nothing. A player must have at least one card of a suit to declare a suit trump. There are two rounds of declaring in clabber. The first round begins with the player to the left of the dealer and proceeds clockwise. Each player declares whether to "play" or "pass" the suit of the dealer's face up card as the trump suit. As soon a player says "play", the suit of the dealer's up-card becomes trump, and the cards are played. If all four players pass in the first round, the dealer picks up the face up card and there is a second round, also beginning with the player to the dealers left and moving clockwise. In this round, the trump suit may be chosen from any of the three suits that were not the suit passed in the first round of bidding. If all four players pass again, then the cards are not played and no points are scored for that hand and the dealer must deal again (the deal does not pass to the next player in this case).

=== Trick-play ===
The player to the dealer's left leads to the first trick. Rules dictate what cards may be played on a trick. The first, or lead, card, may be any card in the leader's hand. The basic rules of play are as follows:

- Players must always play a card of the same suit as the lead card when possible. This is called "following suit".
- If unable to follow suit, a trump card must be played. This is known as "trumping in".
- If unable to follow suit or play trump, any other card may be played. This is called "throwing off (suit)".
- Any trump played must beat the highest trump already played to the trick when possible, even if the highest trump was played by the player's partner. This is known as "overtrumping".
- When a non-trump is led there is no obligation to beat the cards previously played to the trick when following suit.

Each trick is won by the highest trump played to it, or, if it contains no trumps, by the highest card of the suit led. The team winning the trick collects the four cards and turns them over to be counted later. The player who won the previous trick then leads the first card of the next trick. This is repeated until all six tricks have been played.

=== Declaring melds ===
During the first trick, players announce melds, scoring combinations of cards that they hold. The team with the highest ranking meld scores all their melds, while the other team scores nothing for melds. The rank and point values for melds are listed above. No card may be used more than once in any meld; Bella excepted. Among sequences of equal length, the one with higher cards wins; if the rank of the cards is also equal, a trump sequence beats a non-trump sequence. If both teams have a sequence of equal rank and length in non-trump suits, neither team scores for meld on that deal. In order to score any meld, the player must announce it just before playing a card to the first trick. Immediately before playing, or leading a card to the second trick, he/she must show it. If the player does not announce the meld before playing the first trick, or show the meld before playing the second, the meld is not scored.

== Belle ==
Belle/bella (king and queen of trump) is treated differently from other melds. If a player holds belle, it can always be scored, irrespective of any other meld announced and scored by either team. Belle is announced when the second part of it is played, or when shown in a meld. Cards of a belle can also be used in another scoring meld – for example a player holding K-Q-J of trumps can score 40 points for "dad 'a' belle" provided that the dad is not beaten. In this particular case, the belle is announced when the dad is scored, because the holder must show both cards of the bella in order to score the dad; if the belle cards are not used in meld, the bella is announced when the second part of the belle is played.

== Scoring ==
At the end of the play, each team totals the value of the cards in the tricks that they won, plus any score for melds or Bella. The team that takes the last trick scores an extra 10 points. Meld aside, there are 162 points available in a hand. Meld adds points to the score. If the team that made trumps in the bidding has more points than their opponents, then each team scores the points they made. If the scores are equal, or if the team that made trumps have fewer points than their opponents, the trump making team scores zero points, written as "XXX" on the score sheet and known as a "Set", a.k.a. "a hick", "turkey tracks", while the other team scores whatever points they won in tricks and melds. In this case the team that made trump is said to be "set" or "hicked".

If a team scores no points by taking tricks, their zero is written on the score sheet as a line ("--"). Melds always count, however, except in the case of a renege, or a "set/hick"; so, a team that takes no tricks, but has meld, still scores the value of their meld. If a team "goes set", however, all meld is lost unless the value of the meld, added to their trick score, outscores the opponents.

The game ends when either team's cumulative score reaches 500 points or more.

== Renege ==
Infractions of the rules of declaring, melding, and play are known as reneges. In case of a renege, the play ends, and the opponents of the team that reneged score 162 points plus meld. If both teams renege in one hand, the hand is not scored and must be re-dealt by the same dealer. Reneges must be called before the last trick has been turned over. Possible reneges are:

- Failing to follow suit when able; failure to trump when necessary, and able.
- Failing to beat the highest trump card played (over-trumping) when necessary.
- Calling, and/or showing, a Meld out of turn. Announcing Bella before the second part of it has been played.
- Leading, or playing, out of turn.
- Declaring Trump suit with no cards of that suit.
- Looking at a past trick after a card has been played to the next trick.
- When claiming a renege against opponent, and not proving it.
- Answering partner's questions, or advising partner regarding play.
  - Examples: “What’s trumps?”; “Whose lead is it?”; “Is it my lead?”; “It’s your lead”, partner!”; “Who played it?”; “What was led?”; “Give me a lead, partner!!
- Declaring trump, on the second time around, a suit previously passed by all players on the first round.

== Misdeal/re-deal ==
- A card exposed during the deal requires a re-deal, with the same player dealing again.
- Dealing out of turn is a misdeal, but must be claimed before the last card is dealt.

== Tournament play ==
Many bars, and private clubs, hold Clabber tournaments, some year-round, and others in the Winter months. Formats of tournaments are usually set so that the event lasts a predetermined number of weeks, depending on the number of teams entering. These tournaments are generally held as Single Round-Robin tournaments where each team meets each other once. At the end of the tournament, i.e., when each team has encountered each other team once, the tournament ends, and the team with the highest score is declared the winner. Scoring for these tournaments are usually by Games Won, so that the team with the highest number of won games, is the winner. If there's a tie, then Game-points are calculated for the tiebreaker. Alternative scoring can be based on Game-points only, with the number of games won being irrelevant.

The Evansville Clabber League also holds annual tournaments to determine a City Champion for that year. These tournaments generally start organizing in August and September.

== Evansville Clabber League Historical Rules ==
The following are excerpts from a handout held by the Evansville Clabber League. These were in effect as of 2019.

=== 1942-43 Season (Revised October 1984) ===
1. Cards must be cut after being shuffled and at least 4 cards left in each part of the deck.
2. Cards must be dealt one at a time, 6 times around.
3. Any card exposed while dealing requires a re-deal.
4. If a player deals out of turn a misdeal can be called only before the last dealt card is turned in order to declare the out of order deal illegal. After the dealer's sixth card is turned, the deal is legal.
5. It is a renege to play a suit previously passed. A player must call renege before playing his first card.
6. In order to name trumps, the player must have at least one trump. Penalty for playing hand without a trump will be a renege.
7. Melds called and/or shown out of turn is a renege.
8. Players may not call meld for partner or instruct him in any manner as to course of play; penalty is a renege.
9. After any part of a card is exposed to the point of recognition in the act of playing, it must be considered played. If one or more cards are exposed in any other fashion, the hand is dead, the penalty is a renege.
10. All hands must be played out unless otherwise agreed upon before starting play. If agreement is made to lay hand down if you have all tricks, be sure you have all tricks in your hand for if your opponent can show how you could lose a truck, the penalty is the same as a renege.
11. Leading or playing out of turn constitutes a renege. This does not apply to last trick.
12. Each and every trick shall be turned over before the next card is led or the hand is dead, the penalty is a renege.
13. Cut studying time to the lowest minimum, as excessive studying shows poor sportsmanship.

=== Revision 10 December 1992 ===
No trick can be looked at after it has been turned. A review of turned tricks is counted as a renege, A renege must be called before the last trick is turned. A hand challenged for a renege to the point of turning over played tricks for review is a renege on the challenging team if claimed renege is not proven.

== See also ==
- "Clabber Party" (Evansville Press : 25 November 1909).
- "Clabber Game Led To Negroes' Row" (Evansville Press : 19 July 1915, page 6, column 5).
