= Jass =

Card game

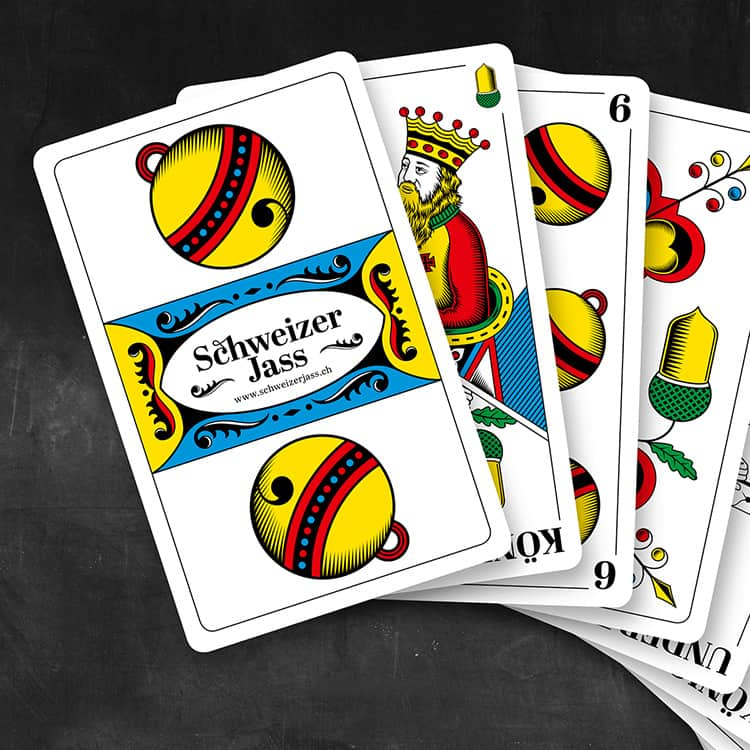
- Swiss Jass cards
- Type: Point-trick
- Players: 4 (variants: 2-6)
- Skills: Tactics & Strategy
- Cards: 36
- Rank (high→low): A K O U B 9 8 7 6
- Play: Counter-clockwise
- Playing time: 45 minutes - 1 hour
- Chance: Medium

Related games
- Belote • Klaverjas

Jass (German pronunciation: [ˈjas]) is a family of trick taking, ace–ten card games and, in its key forms, a distinctive branch of the marriage family. It is popular in its native Switzerland as well as the rest of the Alemannic German-speaking area of Europe, Italian South Tyrol and in a few places in Wisconsin, Ohio, California, Oregon and Washington USA.

The most common variant of Jass is Schieber (in Vorarlberg also known as Krüzjass), which is played by two teams of two players each. It is often considered Switzerland's national card game, and is so popular there that the Swiss have come to apply the name Jass to trick-taking card games in general.

It is estimated that there are over 70 variants of Jass. The game is so widespread in Switzerland that it is regularly featured on radio and television, for example, radio programmes by SRF 1 and the weekly television programmes of Donnschtig Jass ("Thursday Jass") and Samschtig Jass ("Saturday Jass") on Schweizer Fernsehen. An estimated 3 million Swiss play Jass regularly and it has been described as a Swiss national game.

== Distribution ==
Jass is popular throughout the Alemannic German-speaking area of Europe which includes German-speaking Switzerland, Liechtenstein, the Alsace region in France, Vorarlberg, the westernmost province of Austria, southwestern Germany (in the south of the state of Baden-Wuerttemberg), as well as in Romansh-speaking Swiss Graubünden and the French-speaking area of Switzerland and German-speaking South Tyrol in Italy. It is also played in a few places in the state of Wisconsin and in Tuscarawas County, Ohio, USA.

== Name ==
Jass, first mentioned in Switzerland in 1796, was originally the name of the highest trump, the jack, in a family of related games originally spread from the Netherlands during the Late Middle Ages.

Today, Jass is the name of the game. The traditional 36-card, Swiss-German-suited pack with which it is played is called Jasskarten. By extension, Jass is often used of any game played in Switzerland with such cards. The jack of the trump suit is not known as Jass in the contemporary game. It is called Bauer, Trumpf Puur or simply Puur.

The name Schieber, the most popular variant, is from the verb schieben "to push", from the act of "pushing" the responsibility of choosing trumps on one's partner.

== Deck ==
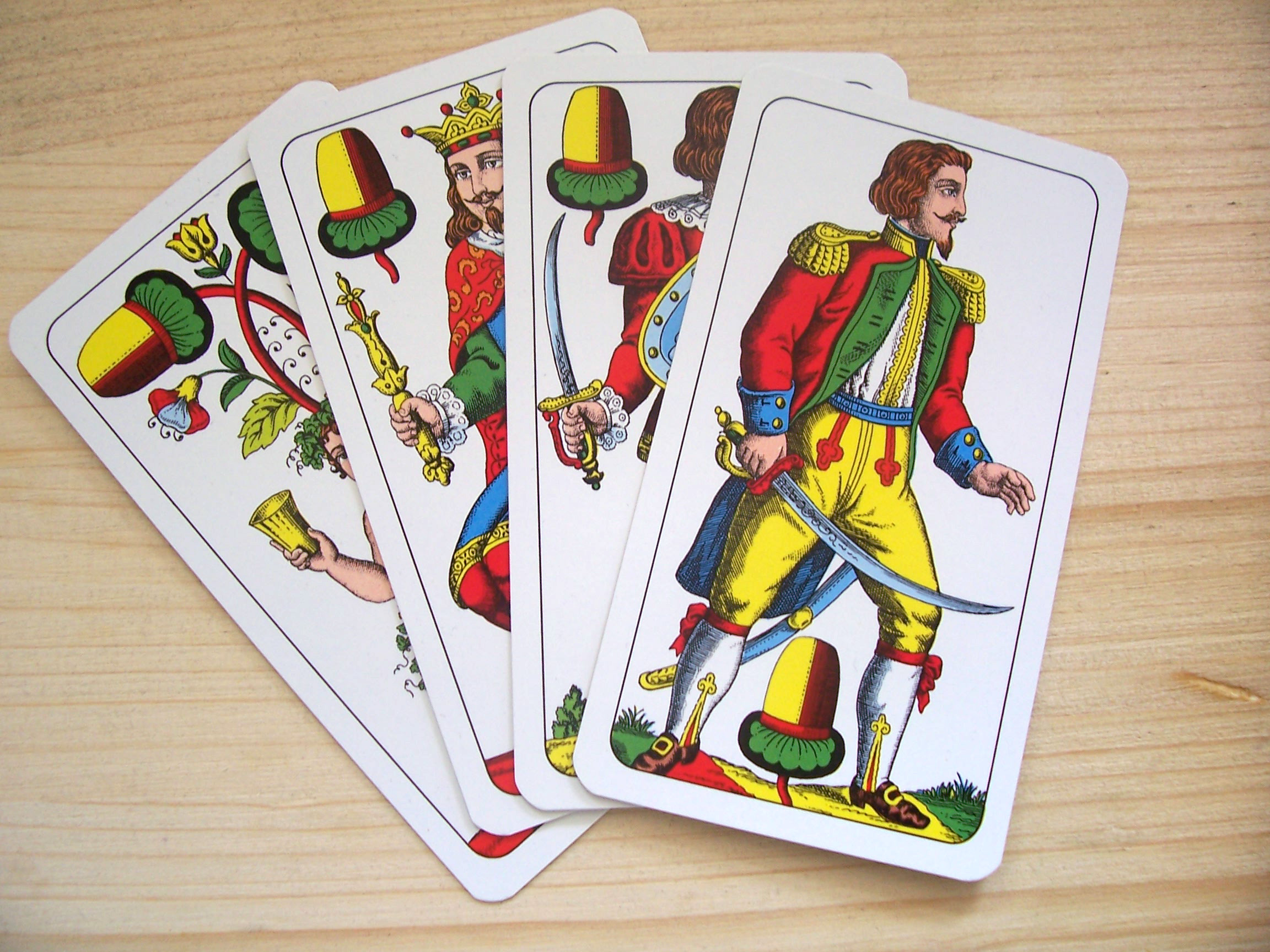
The Jass cards used in Vorarlberg

Jass is played with a deck of 36 cards (A, K, Q, J, 10, 9, 8, 7, 6) Swiss-French or Swiss-German cards (A, K, O, U, B (= 10), 9, 8, 7, 6). The Swiss-German packs have an Ober, Under and Banner instead of the Queen, Jack and Ten of the French pack. The Swiss-French cards are in the ordinary French suits but have a distinctive design. The Swiss-German cards use Swiss suits, a variant of German suits, and also have a distinctive design. In Austrian Vorarlberg, cards of the Salzburg pattern are used (see illustration).

Swiss-German (German)
Schellen	Rosen	Schilten	Eichel
Austrian (Bavarian)
Schellen	Herz	Laub	Eichel
French
Diamond	Hearts	Spades	Clubs
Diamonds	Hearts	Spades	Clubs

The game is traditionally played with Swiss suited playing cards east of the Brünig-Napf-Reuss line and with the French in western Switzerland. The Swiss suits are Rosen (roses) Eicheln (acorns), Schilten (shields) and Schellen (bells).

== Schieber rules ==
Jass is essentially a game of points which are scored for three features known as Stöck, Wiis, Stich, respectively, "marriages, melds, tricks".

To win, the player (or team) must be the first to reach a score of 2500 points (or whatever target score is agreed on beforehand). Play ceases the moment one side reaches the target score, for which purpose it is important to remember that scores accrue in order "marriage, melds, tricks".

The standard Schieber involves four players, sitting in two partnerships, opposite each other. 9 cards are dealt in batches of 3s.

=== Match type ===
Eldest (holder of 7 of Bells or Diamonds) may nominate the trump suit in the first match. The privilege of declaring trumps is passed around the table in counter-clockwise direction for each subsequent match (variant: each deal from the second onwards is made by a member of the side which won the previous deal, so that the losing team has the advantage of making trumps and leading first.)

The player who may nominate the trump suit may pass (schieben) the privilege to his partner, who must then exercise it. If elder leads without making any announcement, whatever is led becomes trump.

There are a number of conventional expansions of the type of play that can be chosen beyond the four trump suits, and modifications to the value of the tricks. Most commonly:

- It is usual to double all scores made in contracts with Schilten (Shields) or Schellen (Bells), which are the suits starting with Sch- (these are replaced by the "black" (schwarz) suits – Spades and Clubs – when playing with a French suit) as trump, treble contracts in "tops-down" and quadruple contracts in "bottoms-up". The game target may then be raised to 2500, or 3000.
- Schieber is usually played with two additional bids, Oben-abe and Unden-ufe, which may reasonably be translated respectively as "tops-down" and "bottoms-up". Both are played at no trump, so that there is no Puur (Under of trump) or Nell (9 of trumps), nor cards worth 20 and 14. Instead, all Eights count 8 points each when captured in tricks, thus maintaining the total of 157 points for tricks, including 5 for the last. In "tops-down", cards rank from Ace high to Six low and in "bottoms-up" their trick taking power is in reverse order, being Six the highest in its suit, and Seven the second highest, down to Ace. For Unden-ufe the point value of 11 may be transferred from Ace to the Six. Reversed ranking also applies to melds of equal length, that is, a sequence of 7 8 9 beats another of 8 9 10, although four Jack still count 200 and so beat all else. If the game is also using the rules for multiplying points outlined above, the points in Oben-abe are multiplied by three, and the points in Unden-ufe by four.
- A team taking all nine tricks score 100 extra for the "match" if they were the team that chose trump, thus a total of 257. If the team that didn't choose trump takes every trick, the number of points they win from Stich is doubled, on top of any other multipliers that may have already been considered. This is called a "counter-match".
- Another call that may be added is Misere, meaning "Misery". Play proceeds based on the rules for Oben-abe ("tops-down") meaning there is no trump, and points gained are not multiplied by anything. At the end of the hand, all points won from Stich are given to the opposite teams than that won them.

=== Tricks ===
The trump Jack, also called Puur, counts 20 and is the highest card in the game. The trump Nine or Nell is the second best card. Plain suit numerals below 10 count nothing. The total value of all counters in the pack is 152, that is, 62 in trumps plus 30 in each plain suit. Winning the last trick scores an additional 5 points. Hence the total possible for the third scoring feature, "tricks", is normally 157 points.

- The rank of the cards, from highest to lowest, and their values in card points are shown in the following table:

Card values
Plain suit rank			A	K	O/Q	U/J	10	9	8	7	6
Value	20	14	11	4	3	2	10	0	0	0	0
Trump suit rank	U/J	9	A	K	O/Q		10		8	7	6

The no-trumps game called Obenabe and Undenufe, in which the ranks are reversed, are shown in the following table:

Obenabe – Bock: Rank / A / K / O/Q / U/J / 10 / 9 / 8 / 7 / 6; Value / 11 / 4 / 3 / 2 / 10 / 0 / 8 / 0 / 0	Undenufe – Geiss: Rank / 6 / 7 / 8 / 9 / 10 / U/J / O/Q / K / A; Value / 11/0 / 0 / 8 / 0 / 10 / 2 / 3 / 4 / 0/11

=== Marriage ===
- Marriage (Stöck): A marriage is the holding in one hand of the König and Ober (King and Queen) of trumps. Its holder claims it upon the second of them to a trick. Its score of 20 is recorded as if made before those for melds and tricks, even though it is not revealed until after melds have been declared.

=== Melds ===
- Meld (Wys or Weis): A meld is a suit-sequence of three or more cards, or a quartet of Aces, Kings, Queens, or Jacks scoring as follows:
  - Four Jacks: scores 200
  - Four 9's: scores 150
  - Five or more in suit sequence: scores 100
  - Four A, K, Q, 10: scores 100
  - Four in suit sequence: scores 50
  - Three in suit sequence: scores 20

A card may not be used in two melds at once, though the trump King or Queen may belong to a meld in addition to being married, that is, a player holding four Kings and a sequence of four to the Ace or King would count only 100 for Kings, not also 50 for the sequence.

- Only the holder of the best meld may score for it, but he may also score for any other melds he holds involving entirely different cards, and in a partnership game, his partner also scores for those held by his partner. The holder of the best meld is found in the following way as each player contributes a card to the first trick. The leader declares the value of his best meld. The next, upon playing his card says "good" (gut) if he can't beat; otherwise he declares a higher value or the same value and the number of cards it contains. A longer meld beats a shorter, so the previous player then says "not good" if he can beat it, "good" if he can't, or "equal" (gleich). If equal, the next states its rank if a quartet, or its top card if a sequence. A higher rank beats a lower, and the previous player again says "not good". "good", or "equal". Equality must mean a sequence is in question, which the second player can then only win by truthfully announcing "in trumps". Otherwise, all else being equal, the previous player wins by prior position. The next player in turn then competes, if he can, with the winner of the first contest. As before, the pecking order is: value, length, height, trump, position.

=== Play ===
Eldest leads to the first trick and the winner of each trick leads to the next. The trick is taken by the highest card of the suit led, or by the highest trump if any are played. If trumps are led, suit must be followed if possible, except that a player whose only trump is the trump Jack (also called Puur, Buur or Bauer), need not play it but may discard any card instead. If a plain suit is led, players must follow suit or trump, as preferred, but any trump played must be higher than any other already played to the trick. Only if unable to follow suit may any of the players then renounce.

== Tactics ==
The tactical elements of the Schieber derive mostly from the situation of two players each needing to cooperate without seeing, or being allowed to communicate about, the hand the other is holding. The choosing of the trump suit at the beginning of each match is a crucial decision. If the choosing player holds a mediocre hand, he must decide whether to make the call and hope that his partner holds at least some of the cards his hand is missing, or whether to "push" (schieben) the responsibility away in the hope that his partner has an unambiguously strong hand.

Once the match is in progress, players need to keep track of which cards have been played, especially which card of each suit is currently the highest left in play and which trumps have been played. If the player in the lead plays a card that is certain to take the trick (called a Bock), the partner needs to recognize this and contribute as many points to the trick as he can (known as Schmieren, see schmear) without sacrificing valuable cards that he may still need to use for taking a later trick.

== Two-hand variants ==
=== Schaggi Haas ===
In Schaggi Haas ("Johnny Hare"), the two players cut every time for the deal; the player with the lowest card deals 12 cards each in packets of 4, turns the next for trump and then deals one more packet of 4, face down as a personal talon. The remaining 3 cards are placed face down and half-covering the trump upcard. A player with the trump 6 may 'rob' the trump upcard. Players may attempt to 'better' (bessern or schönern) their hand by discarding 4 hand cards and picking up their talon. The discards do not count to their score at the end. Forehand (non-dealer) leads to the first trick. Melding and play are as per normal. A player who takes all 12 tricks does not get a Matsch bonus as not all the cards are in play. The last trick scores 5 and game is 1000.

=== Schmaus ===
Schmaus is the Swiss Jass version of Tartl. In each deal, 9 cards are dealt to each of the two players in packets of three, and the remaining 18 cards form the stock. The top card of the stock is turned for trump. This card can be 'robbed' (rauben) by the trump Six until the 9th trick. The bottom card of the stock may not be viewed by either player; if it is, the cards are redealt by the same dealer. The non-dealer leads a card of his choice, but not a trump. (Note: This is not mentioned by Müller.) Suit need not be followed nor must a trump be played if a player cannot follow. Whoever 'brings home' (Heim bringt) the respective trick takes the top card from the stock. The loser draws the second. The first nine deals are played with 9 cards each. Melding is allowed in each of the first 10 tricks, provided that new melds arise from one deal to the next. Only player with the higher meld scores for it and only one meld may be made per trick. Melds must be made in rising sequence from trick to trick. (The clever Schmaus player makes most of his points by skilful declarations of card combinations!) The player who wins the 9th deal, leads to the 10th. At this point the stock is exhausted and players must follow suit or trump if unable to follow. Game is 1000 or 1500 points as agreed. The winner of a deal, deals next.

=== Zweier-Sidi ===
A Jass variant for 2 players. The game is played with 36 cards, six are dealt face down to each player, six face up on top of the downcards and six dealt to each player's hand. So there are 12 cards in front of each player. The cards are dealt in groups of three, three face down to the non-dealer, three to the dealer, three more to the non-dealer, etc. Before the game begins, players bid, i.e. estimate how many points they will score in the deal. Non-dealer starts the bidding with an announcement of at least 60 points. The dealer must fold or outbid this bid by at least 5 points. Either a suit game, obeabe or undeuf is played. Every type of trump counts singly; there is no melding and Stöck does not count. The maximum score is 157. The player with the highest bid starts. He first determines trumps and then leads off. After a card lying on a face-down card has been played, the card underneath it is revealed. At the end of the game, the points are added together and compared with the bid. If the score achieved is higher than the bid, the difference is scored by the declarer. If the number of points is lower than the bid, the opponent scores the points that the bidder undershot. Game is 50. Example: The bid is 100 points. If the bidder reaches 105 points, he scores 5 points. If he reaches 90 points, his opponent scores 10. One tactic is to play the cards on the table where possible to reveal the cards underneath.

== Three-hand variants ==
=== Königsjass ===
Jass variant for three. Each player receives 3 cards thrice, the remaining 9 go to the talon. The top card of the talon is the trump card. A player with the trump Six may take the trump upcard and replace it with the Six. In addition, all players may decide in turn whether they want to exchange their hand for the talon. If a player decides to do this, he lays his cards away and picks up the talon. The player with the Six can still swap it at this point. Then the game begins. Each player plays alone and generally to 1000 or 1500 points, but also to other target scores depending on the situation.

=== Schaffhauserjass ===
An older variant for 3 players—1 vs. 2. The solo player begins the game as the dealer. 12 cards are dealt to each player, three at a time; the dealer turns up the last card to make trump. The solo player must score 350 points and the two-player team 1,000. The first to reach their goal wins. Melds are valued as per the basic rules, but the solo player does not need to win a trick to score their melds. The team that takes all tricks in a round earns an additional 100 points. Schaffhauser is typically played in sets of three games, with each player in turn being the solo player.

=== Unnamed 3-Hand Variant ===
Cards are dealt as if four players are present (nine to each hand in sets of three), and one hand is left aside. Trump is called as normal, though instead of having the option to pass, the player calling trump may choose to switch their hand for the spare hand set aside at the beginning. If they decide to switch, they may no longer look at their original hand or switch back. This variation forgoes consistency in the strategies used for consistency in the rules of the game. Remembering which cards have been played in order to know with certainty how powerful your own are is no longer feasible, as there are nine cards that are not being played and which cannot be known by most players. The advantage is that this variation changes very little about how the game works, which makes it easier to learn quickly.

=== Mittlerejass ===
12 cards are dealt to three players. Tricks follow the usual Swiss-Jass trick rules. First card to break suit sets trump. If a non-trump is led, and second player plays a trump, third player can only play a lower trump if void of the original suit. No Stöck or Weissen. The aim is to avoid being in the middle position for total captured card points each round: Middle player gets -2 game points, and highest and lowest pt total gets +1 game points apiece. Going over 100 card-pts or getting no tricks will get you -2 (with +1 for the other two players) as well. The game may also be played without negative points ("Plus-Minus"), or by four players (called "Molotow", though different from the 4p game described below).

== Four-hand variants ==
=== Coiffeur ===
A corruption of Quoi faire? ("what shall I play?), Coiffeur is a four player compendium game played in partnership. All the contract options must be played once per game by each partnership. The partnership that determined the type of contract scores the points they achieve.

=== Differenzler ===
After assessing their cards, players must announce an amount, which they have to get as close to as possible. This variant is played in the popular show Samschtig Jass ("Saturday Jass") on Swiss TV.

=== Hindersi-Jass ===
Hindersi-Jass or Hintersich-Jass is an unusual older 'reverse' variant for four players in which the aim is to score the fewest points; however a player taking all tricks wins the deal, scoring zero, while the rest score 157 each. Players are dealt 9 cards each in packets of three and the last card is turned for trump. As usual, forehand leads and players may either follow suit or trump, but may only discard if unable to follow. Undertrumping is only permitted if the led suit is not held (this is the usual rule in reverse Jass games). The players with the two lowest scores after a partie of four games are each given a mark (Strich); the players with the two highest scores receive a minus mark (Nuller or Minusstrich). After 4 or 8 parties the winner is the player with the most marks. There is also a variant for three players.

=== Molotow ===
Molotow is a type of Jass for 4 players. The trump card (in the 1st or 2nd round) is determined by the suit played by the first player who is unable to follow suit (i.e. play a card of the same suit as the first card played in this round).

The goal of Molotow Jass is to score as few points as possible. The so-called table melding (Tischweis) poses an additional difficulty in order to achieve as few points as possible. If there is a meld on the table at the end of the round, the player who takes the trick scores the points for the meld as well. As an additional rule, it can be agreed that the players have to change their seats after each round based on the points achieved so far. Especially in smaller or public spaces (railway carriage compartments, cafés etc.) this can on the one hand attract the attention of other people and on the other hand can loosen up the game.

=== NASA Jass ===
A Jass game for 4 players. The basic idea of this variant is to make the game more difficult yet more interesting by incorporating a quiz. As well as playing normal Schieberjass, players must answer quiz questions in the following way: the player who leads poses a question from the area of general knowledge, which then goes around. If an opponent knows the answer, he gets 20 points, if the partner knows the answer, he gets 40 points, if nobody knows the answer, there are 10 penalty points for the questioner or 10 points are awarded to the opposing team. The name of this type of Jass refers to the fact that, as with NASA pilots, several tasks have to be performed simultaneously. The relatively new type of Jass was developed in student circles and can be modified by, for example, asking a question for each "hand" or by asking questions only from individual areas. Colloquially, this variant is called Nase in Switzerland, especially in the canton of Bern.

=== Palette Jass ===
Variant for 4 players (variant for 5 players, see Jass rules Puur-Näll-As). Each player bids in turn based on the cards they have received. The highest bidder takes over as the declarer and starts the game. He can ask for a card. The player with the requested card becomes the declarer's partner, but must not reveal this. Accordingly, he keeps the requested card so that it is only clear when this card is played who is playing with whom. Each deal is scored separately and generates a score for the Jass slate. The declarer receives the following points: 110–119 = 2 game points, 120–129 = 4 game points, 130–139 = 6 game points, 140–149 = 8 game points, 150–157 = 10 game points. Matsch with partner = 12 game points, Matsch as soloist = 20 points. The partner of the declarer receives half of the points. If the target is missed by the declarer, he scores the same amount in minus points. After two rounds (with everyone dealing twice), the loser is determined based on the lowest total number of points. For tips, strategies and 65 other types of jass see AGM AGMüller's Puur-Näll-As Jass Rules.

=== Pandur ===
In Pandur, four players usually play, but only three are active in the game, and each in turn sits out the hand to which he deals. The scorekeeper deals first, giving 8 cards to each player in batches of 4s from a 24-card pack made by stripping out all ranks below Nine. I addition to the usual melds, a player may announce a sequence of six or a quartet of Nines, each counting 150 points. Only the soloist may score for melds, provided that he has the best, that is, if an opponent has a better meld, it does not score itself but only prevents the soloist from scoring.

Each in turn, starting with eldest, may bid or pass, and having passed may not come in again. The lowest bid is 100 and higher bids must be multiple of 10. A numerical bid is the minimum amount the soloist undertakes to make for "marriages, melds and tricks" in return for nominating trumps and leading to the first trick.

A bid of 200 is overcalled by misère, then trumps misère, then 210 etc. In misère, the soloist must lose every trick, playing at no trump. In trump misère, the suit of the card he leads is automatically trump. Players are still required to trump when unable to follow suit, but are not obliged to overtrump. A bid of 250 is over called by Pandur, and 300 by Trump Pandur. In Pandur, the soloist must win every trick, playing at no trump and in Trump Pandur, the suit of the card he leads is automatically trump.

If successful, the soloist wins a number of game points equivalent to the bid divided by 50 (maximum 6). Misère count 4, Pandur 5, Trump Pandur 6. For a failed bid, the game value is credited to each opponent. Game is 15 points or any other agreed target. If four play, the dealer gets the value of a failed bid, but not if he stands at 13 or 14 points.

Each player drops out upon reaching the target, the game being played by three, then two. The last one left in loses the game.

Trump Misère is dangerous and must be made in a short suit, in order to lose a card that would be even more dangerous at no trump, that is, with three safe suits and a singleton Queen, the soloist would announce "trump" and lead the Queen. As the Jack and Nine are top trumps, this would only lose if one opponent held the 10 and the others were void. If played at no trump, there would be three cards lower than the Queen, making the bid very risky. When only two players remain, so that eight cards are out of play, any misère, is riskier than usual, especially with a trump.

=== Sechser–Schläpf ===
A normal game of Jass, except that it is played with hands of six cards rather than nine, hence the Sechser ("Sixer") in the name.

=== Sidi Barani ===
A Jass variant that is similar to Schieber, Sidi Barani is a game for 4 players, with the difference that it is not specified who can choose the contract. This right goes to the person who announces the highest score when bidding (similar to bidding in Skat). If the declarer and his partner reach this score (e.g. 120), they receive a bonus in addition to the declared number of points (e.g. 120). If they do not reach their target, the opponents receive the bonus. However, both teams score at least the points achieved. The opposing team has the option of doubling until the first card is led. If the opposing team doubles, the bonus applies twice. If the game is played for 120 points, for example, the winning team receives a bonus of 240 in addition to their score.

=== Veehändler ===
Jass for 4 players. All the cards are distributed evenly. In the first deal, the player with the Acorn Banner (Ten of Acorns) in his hand leads, then it rotates in turn. A total of three penalty points are awarded in each deal: the first point is given to the player who takes the first trick. The second penalty point goes to the player who captures the Bell Ober in a trick and the third penalty point goes to the player taking the last trick. The player who first reaches nine penalty points (or another number if agreed) loses the game and pays the forfeit. Suit must always be followed. The first player who is unable to follow, determines the trump suit by the card he deals. The trump card is always a suit, i.e. there is no Obeabe and Undeuf. If a player is dealt the Ober of Bells as his only Bell (Schällenober blutt), when the first card is played he may declare that he has the "nasty card" (s’fiise Chart). Now the player who beats the Ober of Bells gets a plus point. The nasty card does not have to be declared, but it is then more difficult to avoid getting a penalty point for ending up with it.

== Six-hand variants ==
=== Sechser-Schieber ===
A variety of Jass for 6 (hence the name; Sechser = "Sixer") in 2 groups of 3 players. The game is played with 2 packs, each player receiving 12 cards. Basically, the game works the same as normal Schieber. If two cards are the same, the one that was played later wins. Up to three 'shoves' are allowed.

== Multi-hand variants ==
=== Bieter ===
Bieter, known as Steigerer in Austrian Vorarlberg, is a game for 3 or 5 players, played in teams of 1 against 2 or 2 against 3. Players bid the number of points they hope to win and the highest bidder names a card of his choice. The player with that card becomes his partner and form the two-man team. In the five-hand game, the two-man team only needs to score the declared points to win, whereas the three-man team has to score 1000 points. This is the version that is most like Skat.

=== Chratze ===
Jass for 2 to 7 players, players receive 4 cards each and play for a pot, the Chraztze player (Chratzender) must take 2 tricks and the other active players one trick each. Related to Austrian Kratzen.

=== Fahnder ===
Fahnder is a variant of Jass for three or four players.

=== Guggitaler ===
Guggitaler is a Swiss Jass variant for 3 to 5 players. It is a compendium game in which the aim is to score as few points as possible. It is played without trumps. The game consists of several deals, each deal having different rules. In the first deal, each rose scores 5 points, in the second each trick is worth 10, in the third each Ober scores 20, in the fourth the Rose King scores 45 and in the fifth deal, all these scores are combined. In deals 1, 4 and 5 no Roses may be led as long as you have other cards in your hand. In the sixth deal, a Domino is played, which can change the entire distribution of points. The points distribution in Domino depends on the current point rankings. With 5 players, a card (usually a 6) must be omitted.

=== Handjass ===
Handjass, also known as Butzer, Schläger, Sackjass or, in South Tyrol, Sockn, is a game for 2–5 players—every player for themself (cut-throat). The object of the game is to score 5 (or 7, 9) game points (also called points, strokes, lines, or rubs). As each player counts out after scoring 5 game points, the last player remaining is the loser. With simple scoring, however, the first player to reach 5 game points is the winner.

Game points are scored +1; they are determined by card points won via tricks taken and melds scored. There are generally two game points available each round: one for each of the two highest scoring players. If the second score is tied, the tie can be broken by cutting the deck (high card is awarded the point). Some players house-rule that if the second highest score is tied, there is no tie-breaker and no point is scored. If only one player scores greater than 21 points (or if all but one player folds), that player is awarded two game points. If a player scores fewer than 21 points in a round, they are said to be "in the hole" and earn a negative game point (valued at −1). This negative point value is also called a null, potato, apple, or wheel.

The base rules of Jass for card rank, value, and melds apply. Before each round, each player must declare whether they're staying in or folding. If they fold and turn down their hand, they sit out that round. This can be done to avoid taking a negative game point and is an important strategic consideration as one gets closer to going out/winning.

For a 5-player game, remove the six of spades from the deck. Each player receives seven cards and the dealer turns up the last card as trump. Once a player reaches 5 game points, they count out or win (depending on the scoring type). For a 4-player game (and down), the deck is restored to 36 cards and each player is dealt nine cards. For a 3-player game, each player receives nine cards, but one becomes the blind/talon/stock. Turn up the top card of the blind to determine trump. The player holding the six of trump may rob (exchange) the turned up trump. A player may exchange their hand with the blind, but they must play the hand if they do. In a 2-player game, deal as in a 3-player game, but one hand becomes the blind/talon/stock and the other hand is dead/out-of-play. In the 2-player game, a common house rule is that melds may be scored without taking a trick.

The 2–3-player game can also be played by dealing 12 cards to each player. There is no blind in a 3-player game, but each player must now score 31 card points to stay out of the hole. Dealer turns up the last card as trump. In a 2-player game, the top card of the blind is turned up to make trump.

=== Klammern ===
Game variant for 2 to 4 players. The game scores, as in darts, up to 301, 501 or 1001. The goal is to be the first to cross the line. In addition, the attacking player who chooses trumps must score more points than his opponent. Otherwise, the points are taken by the opponent.

=== Kreuzjass ===
Most popular card game in the west Austrian state of Vorarlberg. Four play in teams of two. Unlike Schieber, the privilege of choosing the trump suit may not be passed to one's partner and trumps are chosen instead by cutting. It is played to 1,000 points.

=== Ramsen ===
A form of Rams played during the week between Christmas and New Year (Altjahrwoche) mostly in the Upper Basel region (played for Schüfeli or salami), but also in Emmental, from the upper Lake Brienz to Meiringen, in Obwalden, in Oberaargau and in the German-Freiburg Sense District (played for sausages).

=== Schellenjass ===
Literally "Bell Jass", this is a variant for 2 to 4 players, where the aim is to avoid capturing Bells or to take all nine. If a player manages to collect all nine Bells, that is, to make a Turi, he is credited with three lines on the slate, while the other three players are empty-handed. The game is played without trumps and a Bell may only be discarded if a player can no longer follow suit. If Schellenjass is played with French-suited cards, Hearts are chosen as the relevant suit, the game is then called Herzjass.

=== Zuger ===
Zuger is a cutthroat game of temporary alliances for 2–4 players. The object of the game is to have the most points before the total score reaches 100. Meld and Stöck rules apply. The Groß Weis is standard and kreuzweis is valid. Zuger uses simple scoring where the ones unit is dropped, e.g., 123 = 12.

If 4 players are participating, the dealer sits out the round (and receives 10 points in exchange). Each player is dealt 12 cards, with the last card turned up as trump. Before play begins each player must announce whether they're staying or folding. Players may also announce “maybe” – meaning they play only if another player folds. If 2 players stay, they may agree to share 7 points each and split the meld points. Melds worth ≤ 50 points are typically shared, but many players opt to keep higher scoring melds for themselves (Stöck is rarely shared). The second player can be bribed with or demand a greater share of the trick points, divvied up from a total of 14 points. If all 3 players remain, they can negotiate as above, but only if all agree – this ends the round.

The player with the fewest points may force all players to stay if another player is within 14 points of winning.

A player who folds cannot score any points, but avoids a −10 point penalty for going “in the hole.” If all but one player folds or if one player scores a match (takes all tricks) they score a 10-point bonus. In a 3 player game, if one player fails to win a trick, the player holding the Bauer scores an 8-point bonus. The game is over when the sum of all points equals 100. Simple scoring is used, e.g., 127 = 12, a 100-point meld is worth 10 points, etc. Odd numbers are further rounded or the difference is given to the player holding the Bauer.

== Older variants ==
Other, older Jass variants include Fischentalerjass, Bäretswilerjass, Schaffhauserjass, Raubjass, Zebedäusjass and Zugerjass.

== See also ==
- Klaberjass
- Belote
- Chratze

== Literature ==
- Goop, Adulf Peter (2010). Jassen: ein wichtiges Stück Volkskultur in Eintracht, pp. 11–30. (in German).
- Müller, Dani (2016). Stöck, Wys, StichLenzburg: Fona. (in German).
- McLeod, John and Michael Dummett. (1975). "Rules of games series: 1. Jass" in The Journal of the Playing-Card Society. Vol. III, No. 3. February, 1975. pp. 21–33. (in English).
