= Tatteln =

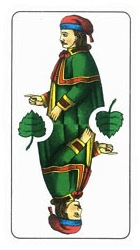
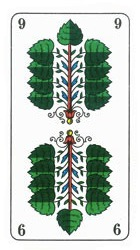
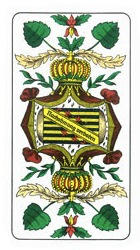
- The top three cards when Leaves are trumps
- Origin: Austria, Germany
- Alternative names: Törteln, Terteln, Franzefuß, Frantsfuus, Därdechen, Därde, Derdeln
- Type: Point-trick
- Players: 2
- Cards: 32
- Deck: French- or German-suited pack
- Rank (high→low): Trump suit: J 9 A 10 K Q 8 7 Plain suits: A 10 K Q J 10–7

Related games
- Piquet, Mariage, Sixty-Six, Klaberjass

Tatteln, also called Franzefuß and Därde, is an historical card game for two players that is played with a pack of 32 French or German playing cards. The rules resemble those of Piquet and Mariage (Sixty-six), and David Parlett refers to it as a trick-and-draw version of the international classic, two-hander, Klaberjass.

Contemporary card game very similar to Tatteln is Terts.

== Names ==
Tatteln went under a wide variety of names including Tärtel, Törteln, Tertelé, Franzefuß, Frantsfuus, Därdechen, Därde, Därdel and Derdeln.

== History ==
Recorded as early as 1801 in Hamburg, as well as in Denmark as Frantsfuus-Spillet, the rules of Tatteln were also published in Austria in 1829 and, as Tattelnspiel, in Germany in 1830. According to the Oeconomische Encyclopädie, by 1858 it had become "a very popular game in Austria, although it bears no originality, being a combination of the well-known game of Piquet and the archaic game of Mariage, nevertheless it has received acclaim; it is harder than the latter [Mariage], but easier than the former [Piquet]."

The game does not seem to have survived the 19th century, its rules being last recorded by Ulmann in 1890, who calls it Franzefuß, but also acknowledges that it is known as Tatteln, Därdechen or Därde. Modern descendants of this game include Austrian Tartl and the related Hungarian game of Tartli. As Tärtele, however, the game remained popular in Alsace until World War II.

== Rules ==
=== Cards ===
The game is played with a 36-card, French-suited pack. The ranking of the cards, from highest to lowest, together with their values in card points, is shown in the following table:

Card Values
| Plain suit rank | | | A | K | Q | J | 10 | 9 | 8 | 7 | 6 |
|---|---|---|---|---|---|---|---|---|---|---|---|
| Value | 20 | 14 | 11 | 4 | 3 | 2 | 10 | 0 | 0 | 0 | 0 |
| Trump suit rank | J | 9 | A | K | Q | | 10 | | 8 | 7 | 6 |

In this game, only the card points within the tricks count; the number of tricks won is irrelevant. Only the last trick deviates from the rule, because even if it contains no counters, it scores 10 points.

Various card combinations are important for the actual game. For example, three consecutive cards are called a 'tattel' (Tattel, Därde or Tärten). A run of four cards is called 'quart' (Quart) and one of five cards is called 'foot' (Fuß). A quart not only counts in its own right, but also as two tattels, a foot as well as three tattels and two quarts. A set of three equal ranking cards is outbid by a set of four, even if they are lower, otherwise a higher triplet beats a lower triplet and a higher quartet a lower quartet.

=== Deal and auction ===
The cards are dealt alternately to the two players, one at a time, until each player holds nine or, according to older rules, eight cards. Then the next card is turned for trump. The rest of the cards form the talon, from which the players draw one card after each trick.

Before the first cards are played, announcements are made. Each player must wait until it is his turn to play to the trick before making an announcement. However, this does not prevent a player declaring that an opponent's announcements void.

If an already announced and agreed tattel is accompanied by a card one rank higher or lower in the same suit, then there are two tattels, i.e. one more tattel is added to the already announced tattel, to make a quart. For example: a player announces a tattel of Jacks and then draws the corresponding Queen, then one of them is scored, and then the quart as well, provided that the player has not yet discarded any of the cards that form part of it.

=== Play ===
After each trick players replenish their hands from the talon, the winner of the trick picking up first. Thus both players always have eight hand cards as long as the talon has not been exhausted. If a player forgets to pick up, picks up in the wrong order or takes 2 cards at a time, he is in breach of the rules.

=== Scoring ===
Tens take their natural place in the ranking. In playing to the trick, suit only has to be followed once the talon is exhausted, i.e. when playing to the last 9 tricks. The trump Seven may be used to 'rob' (rauben) the trump card. If a player fails to win any of the last 9 tricks, he has to pay for the whole round.

The calculation of the sequences, tricks and points for which the whole game is played is done in the same way as for Piquet. Tatteln may also be played without trumps.

== Variants ==
The Oeconomische Encyclopädie describes the numerous variants and additional rules thus:

'The description of this game in the "Neuestes Allgemeines Spielbuch". (Vienna, 1829)', says: 'Tatteln is no better than the countless other ephemeral phenomena of fashion. Almost every participant soon experienced its inadequacy, encountered inconsistencies and tried to remedy these shortcomings, with or without expertise, by his own additions and omissions, and to give this patching up at least authority within his own circles, which is why the game has very different forms; because in some areas it is played in a completely different way, often against all reason, the only basis for any respectable or competitive game.etc.'

— Krünitz (1858), "Tatteln", Oeconomische Encyclopädie

== Literature ==
- Jørgensen, S.A. (1801). Rigtig og grundig Anviisning til L’Hombre-Spillet med alle dets forskjellige Spillemaader tillige med Piquet- og Frantsfuus-Spillet. J.H. Schubothes, Copenhagen.
- Jørgensen, S.A. (1802). Nyeste Dansk Spillebog, J.H. Schubothes, Copenhagen. Digitization
- Krämer, Julius (1965-1998). Pfälzisches Wörterbuch. Franz Steiner, Wiesbaden.
- Parlett, David (1991). A History of Card Games, OUP, Oxford. ISBN 0-19-282905-X
- Rost, J.P. (1882). Die Törtelregeln. Nuremberg: C. Flessa.
- Ulmann, S. (1890). Das Buch der Familienspiele. A. Hartleben, Vienna, Munich and Pest.
