= Klaberjass =

Card game

- "Classic two-hander"
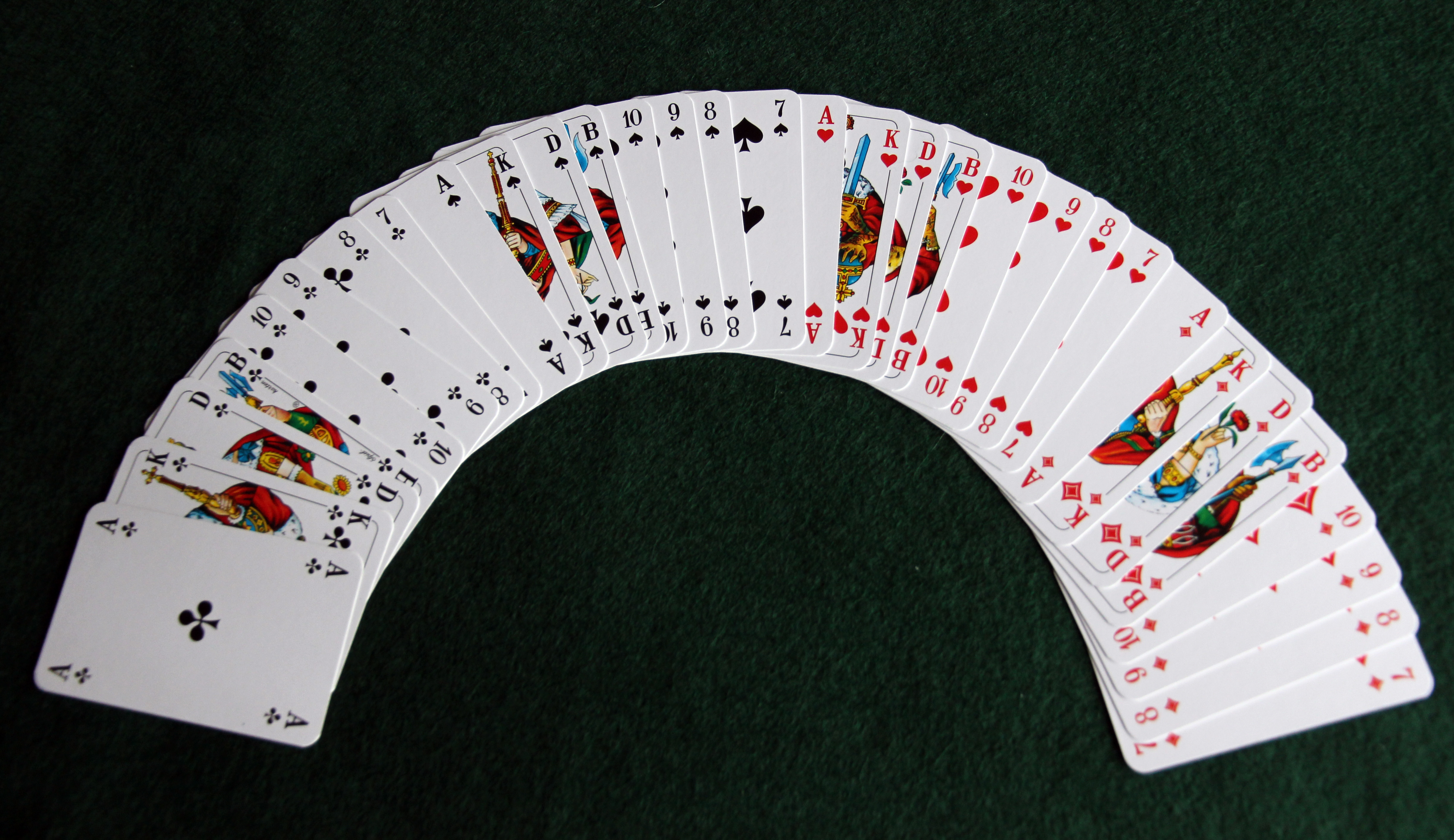
- French-suited 32-card pack
- Origin: Central Europe
- Type: Trick-and-draw game
- Players: 2
- Cards: 32
- Deck: Piquet deck
- Rank (high→low): Trump suit: J 9 A 10 K Q 8 7 Plain suits: A 10 K Q J 9–7

Related games
- Belote • Klaverjas • Tatteln or Franzefuss

Klaberjass (German: [ˈklaːbɐˌjas]) or Bela is a trick-taking ace–ten card game that is most popular in German communities. In its basic form it is a 9-card trick-and-draw game for two players using a 32-card piquet pack.

As in other point-trick games of the king–queen group, players can score points for the "marriage" (bela) of king and queen of trumps. The distinguishing feature of Klaberjass is that the jack (Jass) and nine (Manille) of trumps are elevated to the highest ranks and highest card point scores.

== History and naming ==
The game originates from the Low Countries and is recorded as early as 1730 as klaverjassen, "a type of card game in Holland". An early form was first described in an 1821 Dutch book under a name that translates as klaver Jas, Jas being Dutch for Jack. Klaberjass has spawned the jack–nine family of card games, which consists mostly of four-player elaborations of the original game. In addition to the Dutch and Swiss national card games Klaverjas and Jass, the group contains Belote, which is the most popular game in countries such as France, Bulgaria, Cyprus and Saudi Arabia. The related game of Frantsfuus or Tatteln is recorded as early as 1802 in Denmark.

According to David Parlett, this "popular and widespread two-hander has so many names, mostly variations on the same one, that it is hard to know which is best for universal recognition. Klaberjass is probably closest to the original." He lists the alternative names as "Clob, Clobby, Clobiosh, Klob, Kalabrisasz, Bela, Cinq Cents, Zensa". Other sources also list "Klabberjass, Senserln, Clobyosh, Kalabrias, Klab, Clabber, Clobber, Clubby". Another common name is Klabrias. This truly international game originates from the Low Countries and is particularly strong in Jewish communities. (For an earlier form see the history of jack–nine card games.) It can be interpreted as a two-handed variant of belote, and indeed three-handed belote can be played in exactly the same way. Conversely, tarabish, a game played in Nova Scotia, is a four-handed partnership game variant of this game. (Tarabish is played with 36 cards. This makes sense since in four-handed games it is normal to deal all cards, and thus the number of cards dealt to each player is the same as in the two-handed game.)

== Deck ==
The game is played with a French-suited piquet deck, perhaps best known from the German game Skat. It consists of the ranks A 10 K Q J 9 8 7. In trumps, the jack (Jass) and the 9 (Manille) become the two highest ranking cards. So, trump is ranked J 9 A 10 K Q 8 7. The 7 of trumps (dix) also plays a special role.

== Game structure ==
The overall structure of the game is similar to that of piquet, but with more weight given to trick-play than to melding. It also differs from piquet in using trumps. The game begins by one player undertaking to make more points than the opponent. If that player wins, both players will score their points, otherwise only the opponent will score. Both players' hands are then completed to 9 cards. In the melding phase, players get a chance to quickly make a substantial number of points, but will automatically provide information to the opponent if they try to make use of that. In trick-play the cards have very unequal point values. Whenever otherwise allowed by the normal trick-play rules, players are obliged to win a trick with a trump.

== Rules ==
Rank and value of cards
| Trump suit | Card points | Other suits |
|---|---|---|
| J | 20 | |
| 9 | 14 | |
| A | 11 | A |
| 10 | 10 | 10 |
| K | 4 | K |
| Q | 3 | Q |
| | 2 | J |
| | 0 | 9 |
| 8 | 0 | 8 |
| 7 | 0 | 7 |

Each player receives 6 cards in batches of 3, and another card is turned up to determine the preferred trump suit. Now players in turn get the chance to take the deal, i.e. bet to make more points than the opponent, with the preferred trump suit. If both pass, they in turn may choose to take the deal with a freely chosen trump suit. If both players pass again, the deal is aborted and the other player deals. Once this phase is completed successfully, both players' hands are completed to 9 cards.

In addition to the initial turn-up card, a second card is turned face up to give further information. If the trump suit is as determined by the (first) turn-up card, a player who holds the seven of trumps (dix) may exchange it with the (first) turn-up card. This must be done before melding.

| Score | Meld |
|---|---|
| 50 | sequence of 4 or more in suit |
| 20 | sequence of 3 in suit |

In the melding phase, one of the players may meld any number of sequences of 3 or 4 cards in suit for 20 or 50 points, respectively. (For melding purposes the natural order of cards is used, and in particular tens rank between nines and jacks.) The player who holds the longest, highest-ranking such sequence is allowed to meld. This player is determined by a protocol that minimizes the information given to the opponent.

The melding phase happens simultaneously with the first trick. Elder hand leads a card to the first trick, and optionally announces 20 or 50. Dealer responds with good to let this stand or with not good if he or she can top that. If necessary, dealer asks how many cards?, how high?, in trumps? until it is established whose meld is better. At the end of the first trick, the player who won the right to meld shows the cards of the winning combination and optionally another combination that will also be scored.

At this point each player knows the precise locations of 11 of the 32 cards (the player's own hand plus the two face-up cards) and may have gleaned additional information from the opponent's melding behaviour. The melding player has revealed additional information to the other player, and if a player exchanged the dix this has also given the opponent information.

Ranks and point values of cards are as shown in the table. In trick-play, a player who cannot follow suit must trump if possible, and any trump lead must be overtrumped. A player who holds both king and queen of trumps may score 20 for the marriage (bela) when playing out the second of these cards. For this it is necessary to announce bela when playing out the first of these cards, and from the bela when playing the second. The winner of the last trick scores 10 points.

At the end of the deal, for each player any points accrued for melds, bela and last trick are added to the card points in tricks taken to make the player's combined points. However, for a player who has won no tricks at all, only marriages but not melds factor into the combined points.

If the player who took the deal has made more combined points than the opponent, both players simply score their combined points. In the opposite case the opponent scores the sum of the points made by both. In case of a tie, the player who took the deal scores nothing and the opponent scores their own score. Thus, the player who did not take the deal always scores at least their own points

The first player who has a total score of 500 points or more at the end of a deal wins the game.

== Variations ==
- Instead of taking the game with the preferred trump suit or passing, elder hand may schmeiss (throw) the game. In this case the dealer cannot take the game, but may choose to force elder hand to take the game with the preferred trump suit. If dealer does not force elder hand to take, the cards are redealt.
- If both players make exactly the same number of combined points, then neither player scores. The total is added to the score of the winner of the next game.
- For the Bavarian variant known as Zensa or Senserln, some additional melding combinations as in Belote exist: A sequence of length 5 is worth 100 points, four jacks counts as 200 points, and four aces, four kings, four queens or four tens count as 100 points.
- Under the bare Yass variation, a player who holds the jack of trumps but no further trumps is not obliged to trump a plain suit lead with it.
- In a variant popular in South Africa, if both players have passed the preferred trump suit and the elder has passed on the remaining suits, the dealer is obligated to take the game. The dealer can take on in any suit, including the preferred trump suit. The dealer is said to be "on the bimah" in this variant.
- In Poland most popular variant is known as "Derda". Straight of three cards in the same suit is named "Derda" - 20 points. Straight of four cards in the same suit is named "Fuf" or "50" - 50 points. K+Q in trump suit = Belo, 20 points. Trump jack and Minela (trump 9) are not worth 20 and 14 points respectively by themselves, instead those values are reinterpreted as bonuses, and the trump jack scores twice - 2 card points and 20 bonus points, 22 points total. In the first round of bidding, after the non-dealer passed, the dealer may ask "how many times (are you passing)?", forcing the deal to be either forfeited or played out in the trump suit as turned up. In the second round of bidding, the non-dealer has the option to make a "commercial offer" (oferta handlowa), where the deal would be forfeited in exchange for the current dealer agreeing to deal the next hand (or next few hands) and potentially the non-dealer scoring a handful of points. This offer can be haggled over, and if it's not accepted, the game is played out with the non-dealer's choice of trumps. Derda was most popular in 50-70's among black market and currency speculators. They played it for high stakes like a 5 Card Draw Poker. In the Polish movie "Sztos" there is a scene where one of a main heroes plays Derda in a sleazy bar before a game of 5 Card Draw Poker.
- In Czechoslovakia (Czech republic) you can see another variant of this game. Darda (for 4 players) or Bulka (for 2 players). The highest trump is not Jack, but a Queen (jasek = Jass) and the second trump card is 9 (minela = Manille). Straight of three cards in the same suit is named darda (20 points), straight of four (50 points), straight of five (100 points), four of kind (100 points in honours A, K, J - four of kind 7 or 8 don't score), four of kind 9 (150 points), four of kind Queens (200 points - sure victory). Marriage Q+K in trump suit is named Bejle (=Bela) (40 points), every J = 2 points, every queen = 3 points, every king = 4 points, every 10 = 10 points, every Ace = 11 points, when you win the trick with this cards.

== Three-handed play ==
Although this is not very common, the game can readily be adapted to three players. The following version was reported from Scotland.

All players play separately, and the player who takes the deal must win more than each of the other players, not more than both opponents combined. If a plain suit lead has been trumped by the second player and the third player also cannot follow suit, then the third player is obliged to overtrump if possible or otherwise play a lower trump if possible.

== Four-handed play ==
The following version of four-handed play is common in South Africa.

Players play in teams of two. Six cards are dealt out to each player as before. Then the last of the remaining eight cards is placed face-up, and each individual player bids as in two-player. On the first round of bidding, a player must take on in the preferred suit (or else pass). On the second round of bidding, players may take on in any suit except the preferred suit, except for the last player who may take on in any suit. Also, on the second round of bidding a player may take on in "no-trumps" - that is, declare that there will be no trump suit, and hence no Jass, Manille, or Bela. Once the bidding is over, the remaining eight cards are distributed, two to each player (this includes the card that was used as basis for deciding the preferred suit). Unlike in the two-player version, even if the preferred suit is the trump suit, no player may exchange the seven of that suit for the card which was used to determine the preferred suit.

An alternative method of dealing, used in tournament play, is to deal all eight cards face-down. Each player has a non-playing card (customarily a two) permanently face-up in front of him. For the first round of bidding, the players bid on the suit of the dealer's two.

The melding phase is similar to that of the two-player version, except that teammates don't overrule each other's melds. The trick phase is also similar. Each player plays a card, and the player with the highest priority card takes all four cards. An important technicality in four-handed play is that if trumps are led, players must play a higher trump than the current winning card, if they can. Also, if a non-trump suit is led, and a trump is played over it, then if a following player is void in the suit led, he only has to play a trump if his trump is higher than the trump already played. If he has no higher trump, then he may discard any other card.

The points earned by teammates are counted together, regardless of which teammate won which trick.

== Literature ==
- Jørgensen, S. A. (1802). Nyeste Dansk spillebog (in Danish). Copenhagen: J.H. Schubothes.
- Marin, Pieter (1730). Groot Nederduitsch en Fransch Woordenboek. 2nd edn. Dordrecht: Joannes van Braam. Amsterdam: Hermanus Uytwerf.
