= Klaverjas =

Dutch card game

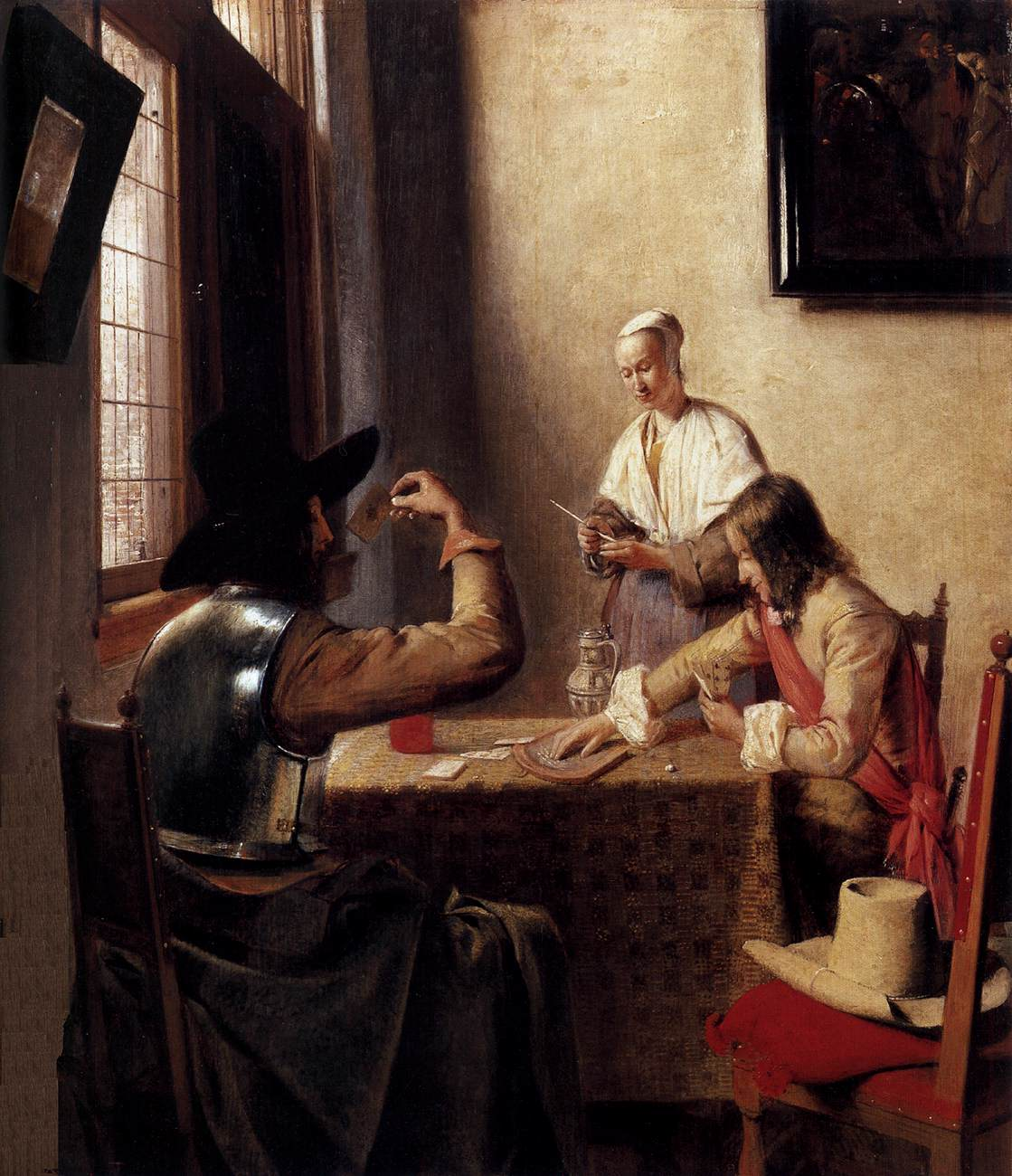
- Soldiers Playing Cards by Pieter de Hooch
- Origin: Netherlands
- Type: Trick-taking
- Players: 4
- Cards: 32
- Deck: French
- Rank (high→low): A 10 K Q J 9 8 7 J 9 A 10 K Q 8 7 (trump suit)
- Play: Clockwise

Related games
- Klaberjass, Belote, Jass, Twenty-eight

Klaverjas (Dutch: [ˌklaːvərˈjɑs]) or Klaverjassen (Dutch: [ˌklaːvərˈjɑsə(n)]) is a Dutch four-player trick-taking card game that uses a Piquet pack of 32 playing cards. It is closely related to the game of Klaberjass (also known as Bela) and is one of the most popular card games in the Netherlands, traditionally played in cafes and social clubs. It offers a considerable level of complexity and depth. It has numerous variants, but its basic rules are universal.

== History ==
The name dates to 1890–95 from the Dutch word klaverjas, combining klaver (the suit of clubs, literally "clover") plus jas, the original name for the highest trump card. According to Scarne, its origin has been variously claimed by the Dutch, Swiss, French, and Hungarians. Parlett unequivocally states that its family of games originated in the Netherlands and is now most-developed in Switzerland.

== Rules ==
Klaverjas is played clockwise by four players in two teams, partners sitting opposite as in whist. It uses a piquet deck, i.e. a set of 32 cards in the four French suits: Ace, King, Queen, Jack and 7–10. All cards are dealt to the players, in batches of 3–2–3 or 4–4.

=== Bidding ===
In the first game, Clubs are always trumps. Thereafter, trumps are determined by the dealer turning the next card of the stock after dealing. Starting with forehand, players announce "pass" or "play". As soon as someone calls "play", bidding ends and the declarer and declarer's partner aim to take the majority of points in tricks, while the defenders aim to prevent this. There are various ways of playing if all pass. For example:

- The dealer turns the next card over for trump and another auction is held. If the card is of the same suit as the first, further cards are turned until a new suit is revealed.
- The dealer chooses trumps and is forced to play.
- Forehand chooses trumps and is forced to play.

Players should agree beforehand which method they will follow.

=== Play ===
There are two main variants. In both cases the overriding rule is that players must follow suit if they can:

Amsterdam rules: If unable to follow suit, players must trump and overtrump if able. If a trump is led, players must overtrump if they can. In other words, undertrumping is only allowed when it cannot be avoided. A player who cannot follow suit and whose partner is not heading the trick must head the trick if possible. If the partner is already heading the trick, the requirement to trump is relaxed and the player may play any card.

Rotterdam rules: As per Amsterdam rules, except that there is no concession for a player who cannot follow suit, but whose partner is heading the trick. The player must always trump and overtrump if able.

Aces and tens are high, i.e. cards in ordinary suits rank Ace, 10, King, Queen, Jack, 9, 8, 7. The Jack ("Jas") and nine ("Nel") in the trump suit are the highest trumps. Thus trumps rank Jack, 9, Ace, 10, King, Queen, 8, 7.

The highest trump in the trick, or in the absence of trumps the highest card in the suit of the first card, takes the trick. The trick winner leads to the next trick.

=== Scoring ===
Card values
Plain Suit Rank			A	10	K	Q	J	9	8	7
Value	20	14	11	10	4	3	2	0	0	0
Trump Suit Rank	J	9	A	10	K	Q			8	7
"Roem" Suit Rank			A	K	Q	J	10	9	8	7

The point values of cards are as in Jass and Belote. In addition, the last trick ("Slag") scores 10 points. Accordingly, the card values and the last trick add up to a total of 162 points.

Additional points are scored by players who have certain combinations in a single trick: Four cards of the same rank (very rare) – 100 (or 200 for four jacks), 3 or 4 consecutive cards in the same suit – 20/50, King and Queen of trumps ("Stuk") – 20. These additional points combinations are called "roem", and must be declared explicitly, otherwise they don't count. Any 3 consecutive cards on the deck, 20pts (when K,Q are included with trump cards, +20pts) Any 4 consecutive cards on the deck, 50pts (idem, e.g. A,K,Q of trump makes 40pts.)

There is a reward of 100 points if the other team doesn't get any tricks. This is called a march ("pit").

At the end of each round, all points are tallied (card values and the last trick plus roem). It is up to the team of players who made the deal to win more points than the opposing team. If they obtain half of the points or less, then all points go to the opposing team (162 plus all the roem). This is called "nat".

Normally the game is played over 16 rounds. At the end of the game, all points are summed up and the team who has the most points overall wins the game.

== Variants ==
There are a wide number of variants of the game, with different names and spellings. The South African version of the game is known as Klawerjas.

== Popular culture ==
It is the famous two-hand game played by the Broadway characters in Damon Runyon’s stories.

== Bibliography ==
- Parlett, David (2008). The Penguin book of card games. London: Penguin. ISBN 978-0-141-03787-5.
