= Dreierschnapsen =

Austrian card game

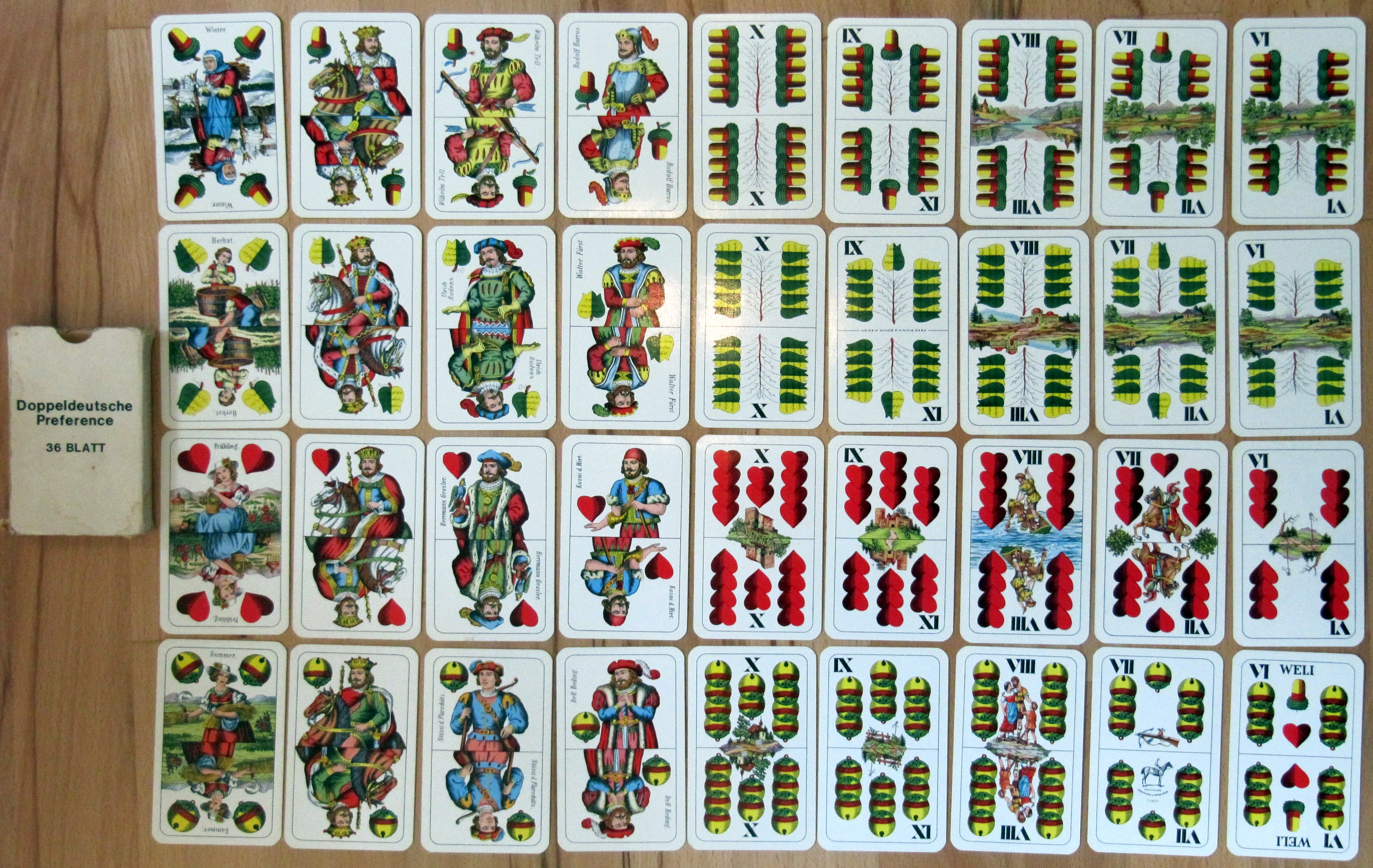
- A William Tell or doppeldeutsche pattern deck
- Origin: Austria
- Type: Point-trick
- Players: 3
- Cards: 20
- Deck: German (William Tell pattern)
- Play: Clockwise

Related games
- Schnapsen • Bauernschnapsen • Gaigel • Sechsundsechzig

Dreierschnapsen ("Three-Player Schnapsen"), Talonschnapsen or Staperlschnapsen is a three-hand variant of the popular Austrian card game, Bauernschnapsen (also called Viererschnapsen). The rules are very similar to those for Bauernschnapsen except that, instead of two teams of two players, one player bids to become the soloist against the other two who form a temporary alliance. Another difference is that the game makes use of a talon with which the soloist may exchange cards to improve his hand, hence its alternative name of Talonschnapsen. The game is usually played with William Tell cards.

== General rules ==
=== Aim and scoring ===
In Dreierschnapsen, the declarer of the highest-value contract plays the two opposing players. If he wins, he scores the value of the contract; if he loses, the defenders each score the contract value. A contract may be worth anything between 1 and 24 points and the aim is to be the first to accumulate 24 points. In one regional variant, scores are counted down from 24 points to zero.

The loser receives a Bummerl. If he has no games points at all, he is Schneider and receives 2 Bummerls. If two players have 23 points each and the third player has none and yet goes on to win, the first two players are given a Retourschneider (Schuster or Rücker), which is worth 4 Bummerls. If two players have the same score at the end of the game, the winner is deciding by playing a game of Two-Player Schnapsen (not Bummerl).

=== Cards ===
The game is played with a Schnapsen pack (Schnapskarten) of 20 cards. In French packs the 4 suits are: Hearts (Herz), Diamonds (Karo), Spades (Pik) and Clubs (Kreuz or, regionally, Treff). In William Tell (doppeldeutsche) packs, German suits are used: Bells (Schelle), Leaves (Blatt, Grün or Laub), Hearts and Acorns (Eichel).

Card Suits
| French suits | | | | |
| | Hearts (Herz) | Diamonds (Karo) | Spades (Pik) | Clubs (Treff, Kreuz) |
| Double German (William Tell) suits | | | | |
| | Hearts (Rot, Herz) | Bells (Schelle) | Leaves (Grün, Laub) | Acorns (Eichel) |

In each suit there are five cards: the Ace (regionally Deuce or Daus), the ten (Zehner), the King (König), the Queen (or the Dame) and the Jack (or Buben), with values as shown:

Card values
| Name | Points |
|---|---|
| Ace (Ass) | 11 |
| Ten (Zehner) | 10 |
| King (König) | 4 |
| Queen (Dame) | 3 |
| Jack (Bube) | 2 |

=== Playing ===
==== Dealing ====
Dealer shuffles the deck; then the player to the right of the dealer, middlehand, cuts at least once from the shuffled deck or 'knocks' on the deck to indicate there is no need to cut. Each player is then dealt three cards clockwise, starting from the player to the left of the dealer, the 'caller' (Rufer). The caller may choose the trump suit (regionally the trumpf or sometimes atout suit) from his first 3 cards. Next, 2 cards are dealt to the talon, after which each player receives another 3 cards. If the caller opts not to choose a trump suit from the first 3 cards, he must select one from the second packet of three without looking at it and then turn it face up to determine trumps. He then adds it to his hand. In most contracts, the trump suit beats all other suits. If the first three cards that the caller receives are three Jacks (regionally Buben or Bauern), he may insist the cards are reshuffled and re-dealt.

If middlehand has knocked, the first two cards are dealt from the talon after which each player is dealt six cards in clockwise order. The caller first receives a packet of three to determine the trump suit and then his second packet immediately following.

After each deal, the caller becomes the new dealer.

==== Bidding ====
Once trumps are determined, bidding begins. The caller invites the other players to bid for a contract. If everyone passes, the caller, or forehand, plays a 'normal game' or Rufer. If two or more players bid, the one who announces the highest value contract plays. If players choose a contract of equal value, then one player who opts to play 'without the talon' has precedence. If both are willing to forsake the talon, positional priority applies i.e. forehand takes precedence over middlehand who takes precedence over rearhand (the dealer).

In one regional variant, the caller first decides whether to announces a game or "pass". Only if he passes do the other players have the right to bid or pass, doing so in a clockwise direction. The caller does not have to choose a contract after picking up the talon but, provided he has not already done so, may "raise" an existing bid - i.e. announce a contract with a higher value.

The contracts allowed vary from region to region. The most common are: Schnapser, Gang ("Gangl") and Bauernschnapser ("farmer"). The various Bettel ("beggar") contracts are controversial among conservative players as they can make 'normal' games the exception instead of the rule.

==== Trick-taking ====
In some contracts, the announced trump suit becomes invalid and all suits are ranked equal. Within the same suit, a higher card beats a lower; and trumps beat all cards of another suit. For example, if the player has played an Jack of Spades, a King or a Deuce of a different plain suit cannot trick; they can only be discarded. Only a trump card may beat it. The first trick of either team must be played face-up for the duration of the hand.

== Contracts ==
=== Overview ===
The usual contracts are given in the table below. Alternative regional names are shown in brackets. The colour code is: yellow for normal Schnapsen games, red for negative games (taking no tricks) and green for 'slam' games (taking all tricks).

| Contract | Eligible bidder(s) | Trumps | Summary | Points |
|---|---|---|---|---|
| Normal game (Rufer) | Caller | Yes | First to 66 | 1 if defender(s) score >33 |
| Normal game (Rufer) | Caller | Yes | First to 66 | 2 if defender(s) score <33 |
| Normal game (Rufer) | Caller | Yes | First to 66 | 3 if defender(s) take 0 tricks |
| Bettler (Fechter) | Any | Yes | Take no tricks | 4 |
| Assenbettler (Zehnerloch)* | Any | No | Ace low, take no tricks | 5 |
| Ass-Bettler (Ass-Fechter)* | Any | No | Hold an ace, take no tricks | 5 |
| Schnapser (Drei-Stich) | Caller | Yes | Caller wins in 4 tricks (3 with "20er"; 2 with "40er") | 6 |
| Plauderer | Any | Yes | As Bettler, cards open after first trick | 7 |
| Gang (Gangl, Land or Ring) | Any | No | Take all tricks | 9 |
| Zehnergang (Zehnerloch, Zehnerhittn or Zehnerland)* | Any | No | Ace low, take all tricks | 10 |
| Bauernloch* | Any | Yes | Ace low, take all tricks. | 12 |
| Bauernschnapser | Caller | Yes | Caller takes all tricks | 12 |
| Kontraschnapser (Kontra-Drei-Stich) | Non-caller | Yes | Non-caller wins in 4 tricks (3 with "20er"; 2 with "40er") | 12 |
| Farbenringerl (Farbringerl, Farbenjodler or Herrenringerl) | Any | No | Hold all 5 cards of one suit, take all tricks. | 18 |
| Kontrabauernschnapser | Non-caller | Yes | Non-caller takes all tricks | 24 |
| Trumpfringerl (Herrenschnapser, Herrenjodler or Trumpffarbenringerl) | Caller | Yes | Hold all 5 cards of trump suit, take all tricks. | 24 |
| Spritzen (i.e. doubling the stakes, also called Flecken or Schießen) | Any | - | - | gespritzt: × 2 |
| Spritzen (i.e. doubling the stakes, also called Flecken or Schießen) | Any | - | - | zurückgespritzt: × 4 |
| Spritzen (i.e. doubling the stakes, also called Flecken or Schießen) | Any | - | - | zurückgespritzt again: × 8 |

* These regional variants are not always permitted.

=== Talon ===
The declarer is entitled to exchange with the talon in all cases, unless he has declared he will play without it, in which case the game is worth an extra point. Any points in the two discards do not count towards either side (this is only relevant in Rufer, Schnapser and Kontraschnapser). Some circles do not allow the talon to be used with negative games as this makes them too easy.

=== Normal game ===
If no contract is bid, a 'normal game' (normales Spiel) is played, sometimes called a Rufer ('caller'), whereby the caller plays the first card. The aim is to score 66 card points or to win the last trick. If the losing side does not win a single trick, the winning side scores 3 game points. If the losing side scores fewer than 33 points, the winner gets 2 game points. If the loser scores 33 or more, the winner just gets one game point. In Dreierschnapsen players must follow suit and attempt to win the trick (as in Bauernschnapsen and Zweierschnapsen, once the talon has been used up or closed):

1. If a player has a higher card of the same suit, it must be played. If not possible,
2. a lower card of the same suit must be played. If not possible,
3. a trump must be played. If not possible,
4. any card may be discarded.

The player who wins the trick leads to the next unless it was the last one of the hand.

==== Pairs or marriages ====
If a player, on his turn, has a King and a Queen of the same suit, he may declare a Zwanziger ("Twenty"), which wins 20 card points. A trump King and Queen are known as a Vierziger ("Forty") and are worth 40 card points. One of the two cards must be played; usually the Queen is chosen. They must win the trick when they can. If the team gets no tricks in that hand, any such pairs or 'marriages' are invalid. They must win at least one trick for them to count.

=== Bettler (or Fechter) ===
The aim of Bettler ("Beggar") or, regionally, Fechter ("Swordsman") is not to take any tricks. Players must follow suit and try to win the trick. The winner scores 4 points.

=== Schnapser (or Drei-Stich) ===
Only the caller may declare a Schnapser or Drei-Stich ("Three Trick") and he must play the first card. If anyone beats his led card, he loses.

The game may be won in one of the following ways:

1. The caller scores 66 points in the first four tricks.
2. The caller takes exactly three tricks and announces a Twenty (Zwanziger) to score 66 points or more.
3. The caller takes exactly two tricks and announces a Forty (Vierziger) to score 66 points or more.

The caller does not have to decide which option to go for in advance, but merely announces "I'll play a Schnapser" (Ich spiele einen Schnapser). The winner scores 6 points.

=== Plauderer ===
As for Bettler. The difference is that the two defenders are allowed to see the declarer's cards after the first trick (by when the game is usually decided anyway). It is often not permitted. The winner scores 7 or 8 points.

=== Gangl (Ring or Land) ===
A Gang (regionally Gangl, Durchmarsch, Land, Ringerl, Ring or Neuner) may be announced by any player. All suits are the same value. The aim is to take all the tricks. The one who declares Gang plays the first card. The winner gets 9 points.

=== Bauernschnapser ===
As in Gang the aim is to take all the tricks. Unlike Gang, however, the trump suit announced by the caller counts, so it is difficult for players other than the caller to declare this contract. The winner scores 12 points.

=== Kontraschnapser (or Kontra-Drei-Stich) ===
The Kontraschnapser ("Counter-Schnapser") or Kontra-Drei-Stich ("Counter-Three Tricks") can be played by an opponent of the caller. The trump suit declared by the caller counts, the caller starts and the declarer must win the game. The game may be won in the following ways:

1. The declarer must win 66 points in the first 3 tricks.
2. The declarer must win exactly one trick and then announce a Forty-er (Vierziger) to achieve 66 points.
3. The caller must take exactly two tricks and then announce a Twenty-er (Zwanziger) to achieve 66 points.

The winner scores 12 points.

=== Farbringerl (or Farbenjodler, Herrenringerl) ===
Farbringerl is also called Herrengangl or Farbensolo. If a player has all five cards of one suit, he may declare Farbringerl. Atout does not apply. Unlike Bauernschapsen, this game is not automatically won if one has the sixth card as an ace. It earns exactly 18 points.

=== Kontrabauernschnapser ===
Kontrabauernschnapser is similar to Bauernschnapser: the aim is to take all the tricks, the trump suit being named by the caller. The caller plays the first card and the declarer must win all the tricks. The winner scores 24 points; thus the game is ended by a Kontrabauernschnapser.

=== Herrenschnapser (or Herrenjodler, Trumpffarbenringerl) ===
If the caller holds all the cards of the Atout suit, he may declare a Herrenschnapser. This game counts for 24 points. Like Farbenring, and unlike Bauernschapsen, this game is not automatically won if one has the sixth card as an ace.

=== Flecken (or Spritzen, Schießen) ===
If the defenders believe that the declarer will lose the game, they can call "double!" This is known as spritzen or, regionally, also as flecken, schießen or kontern. The contract is then worth double the points. With the announcement Retour or Kontra or Zruckgspritzt the soloist may double it again, if he is nevertheless sure that they can win the game. This can be responded to again with the declaration Re or nuamoi zruckgspritzt, whereupon a win would bring eight times the actual number of points - but this kind of thing does not happen very often. Every contract can be gefleckt, both normal ones as well as special contracts.

If the team that is leading could reach zero, their opponents will often call "auf Stand", regardless of the quality of their own hands. They do this because doubling makes no difference if the team loses, but if they are lucky it may increase their chances of winning.

=== Regional variants ===
The following contracts are regional variants, so it is sensible to establish at the outset if these are allowed.

==== Assenbettler (Zehnerloch) ====
As in Bettler the aim of Assenbettler (regionally Zehnerloch), is not to take any tricks, all suits having the same value. As in all other contracts, it is compulsory to follow suit and win the trick if possible. The Ace/Deuce becomes the lowest card, so that the sequence is: 10, King, Queen, Jack, Ace. The winner scores five points.

==== Ass-Bettler (or Ass-Fechter) ====
As in Bettler and Assenbettler the aim of Ass-Bettler (regionally Ass-Fechter) is not to take any tricks, all suits being equal in value. As in all other contracts, it is compulsory to follow suit and win the trick if possible. The player who announces Ass-Bettler must have at least one ace in his hand which makes it more difficult for him not to take a trick. The winner of an Ass-Bettler scores five points.

==== Zehnergang (or Zehnerloch, Zehnerhittn, Zehnerland) ====
As in Gang, the goal is to take all the tricks, all suits being equal. The ace is the lowest card, so the ranking order is: 10, King, Queen, Jack, Ace.

There are two regional differences:

1. If Gang (9 points) and Zehnergang (ten points) are announced, Gang is played.
2. If Gang (9 points) and Zehnergang (ten points) are announced, Zehnergang is played.

The winner scores 10 points.

==== Bauernloch ====
Bauernloch is a combination of Bauernschnapsen and Zehnerloch (or Zehnerloch, Zehnerhitten, Zehnerland). As in Zehnergang, the aim is to win all the tricks, the exception being that trumps, as in Bauernschnapsen, keep their higher position. The increased difficulty of this contract is reflected in the points. Bauernloch can only be played by the person who chose the trump suit. He must take all the tricks and, if successful, wins 12 points.

== Bibliography ==
- Bamberger, Johannes. Schnapsen: Die schönsten Varianten, 13th edition. Vienna: Perlag-Reihe (2012), pp. 45–48. ISBN 978-3-99006-003-2
