= Cinq-Cents =

Cinq-Cents or Cinq Cents may refer to:

- Council of Five Hundred, an 18th-century, lower house of the French parliamentary system
- Cinq Cents (card game), an ancestor of Bezique
