= Binokel =

Card game

- Traditional Swiss and Swabian game; ancestor of American pinochle
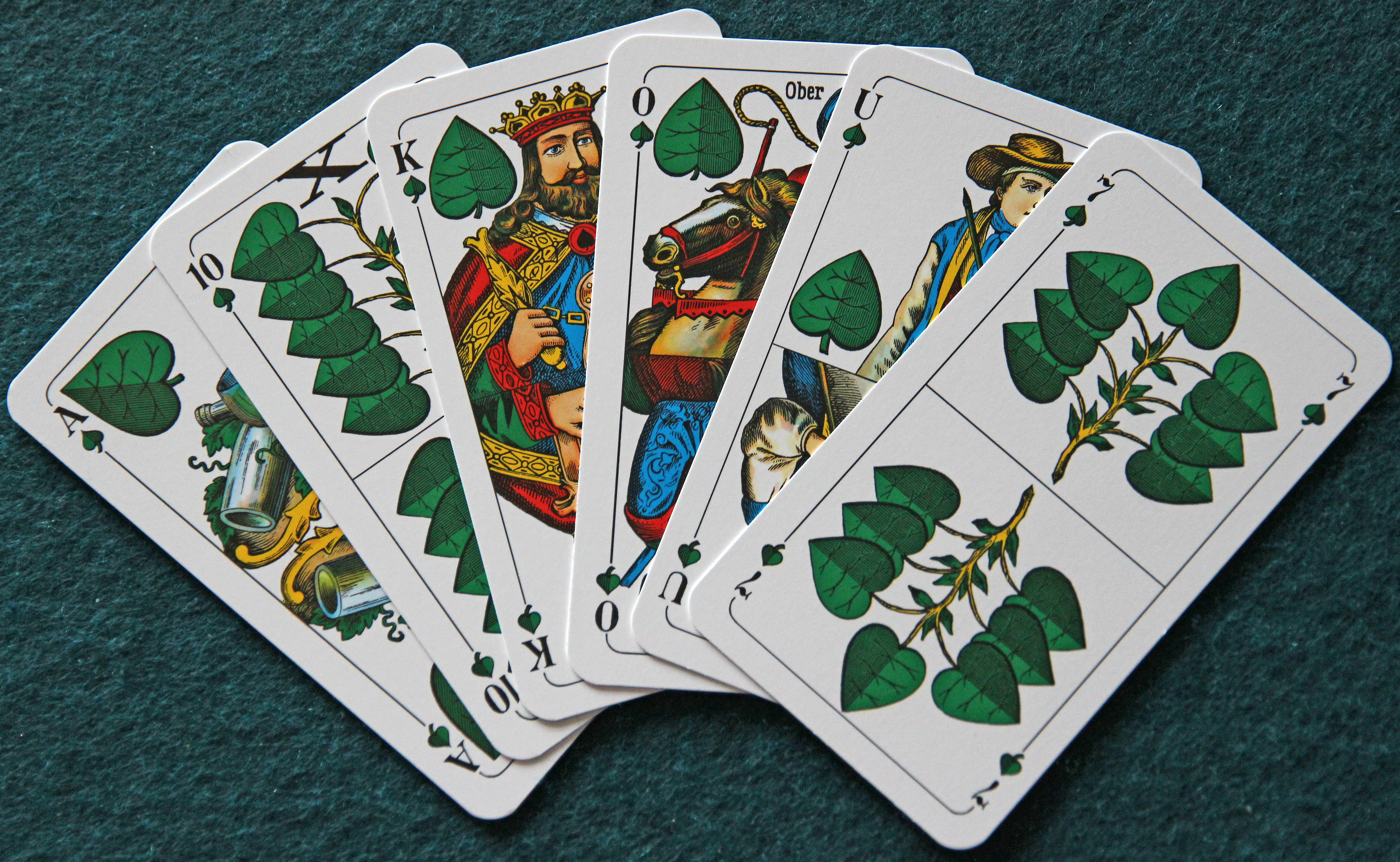
- The suit of Leaves in a Binokel pack
- Origin: Württemberg
- Alternative names: Binocle
- Type: Point-trick
- Players: 2 – 4
- Age range: 10+
- Cards: 2 x 24
- Deck: German (Württemberg pattern)
- Rank (high→low): A 10 K O U 7
- Play: Anticlockwise
- Playing time: 20–30 minutes/game

Related games
- Bézique • Marjolet • Pinochle

Binokel is a card game for two to eight players that originated in Switzerland as Binocle, but spread to the German state of Württemberg, where it is typically played with a Württemberg pattern pack. It is still popular in Württemberg, where it is usually played in groups of three or four as a family game rather than in the pubs. In three-hand games, each player competes for himself, while in four-hand games, known as Cross Binokel (Kreuzbinokel), two teams are formed with partners sitting opposite one another. The game was introduced to America by German immigrants in the first half of the 20th century, where it developed into the similar game of pinochle. Binocle was still played in Switzerland in 1994. In south Germany, the game is sometimes called by its Swabian name, Benoggl.

Binokel belongs to the family of melding and trick-taking games. Unlike others in the family, special card combinations (family, four of a kind, etc.) score additional points. After the deal in the three- or four-player game, there is an auction to bid for the dabb (stack of undealt cards cf. Skat) or tapp. Players bid depending on the card points they expect to score from taking tricks and making melds. The team with the highest bid has to win the game, i.e. score more points in tricks and melds than they bid. Although some of the rules vary from place to place, the basics are standard.

== Origin ==
The game originated from the French card games, Bézique and Cinq Cents and is recorded as early as 1847 as a game being played in Bern, Switzerland, (Note: This is published in the year 1849, but records a diary entry on 6 July 1847.) where it is described as a "combination of Whist and L'Hombre played between four players." In 1856 it is recorded as being played, alongside the game of Brelan, in Vevey on the shores of Lake Geneva. In 1857, Pierer confirms that it is a Swiss card game. A derivative of it, known as Pinochle, is popular in the United States where it was imported by German immigrants in the second half of the 19th century. The name probably comes from the Italian, bin oculi ("two eyes"), because it is played with a double hand. It is still a popular family game in the German state of Württemberg and in Switzerland.

== Aim ==
The aim of Binokel is to be first to reach a predetermined score, usually 1,500, by a combination of melding and trick-taking. The game ends when a player reaches or exceeds the target at the end of a completed deal i.e. it may not be achieved by 'going out'.

== Cards ==
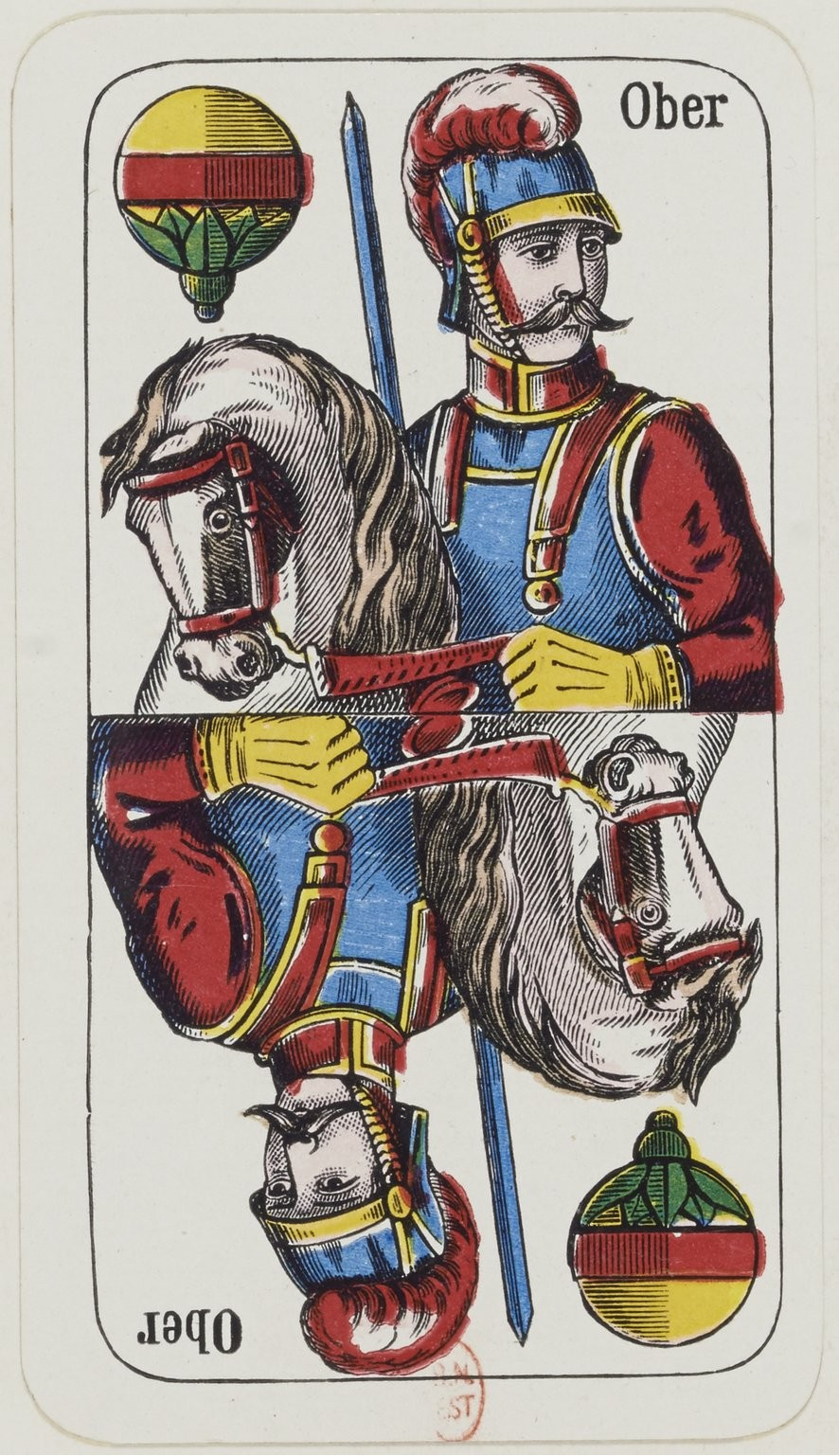
The Ober of Bells from a Württemberg-pattern pack

=== Packs and suits ===
The game traditionally uses two, shortened, German-suited packs of playing cards but two ordinary packs of cards may be used. In south Germany and online, special packs designed for Binokel are sold under the name "Gaigel/Binokel" and use German-suited, Württemberg pattern cards. There are four suits, commonly called Acorns (German: Eichel), Leaves (Schippen, Grün, Gras, Laub), Hearts (Herz) and Bells (Schellen, Bollen). These equate to Clubs, Spades, Hearts and Diamonds in a French suited pack. If a proper Binokel pack is not available, two Skat packs can be used with the 8s and 9s removed so that the 7s are the only low-ranking cards left. A Doppelkopf pack with French playing cards may also be used or, in extremis, two Anglo-American pattern packs with the Twos, Threes, Fours, Fives, Sixes, Eights and Nines removed.

In addition to cards, a paper and pencil (or slate and chalk) will be needed for keeping score.

=== Card ranking ===
The card values in descending order are: Ace (Note: Strictly a Deuce) (Daus, Sau, Alte or Ass), Ten (Zehner), King (König), Ober (Ober), Unter (Unter or Bauer) and, usually, a Seven (Siebener, Leerer, Nixle, Dis, Diß or Diss). However, Binokel can be played without the Sevens, unlike Gaigel.

Card ranking
Württemberg suits
Acorns	Leaves	Hearts	Bells
A 10 K O U 7	A 10 K O U 7	A 10 K O U 7	A 10 K O U 7
French suits
Clubs	Spades	Hearts	Diamonds
A 10 K D B 7	A 10 K D B 7	A 10 K D B 7	A 10 K D B 7

=== Card values ===
The value of cards in terms of card points is as follows:

Card values
Rank	A	10	K	O	U	9	8	7
Value	11	10	4	3	2	–		

Scores are always rounded up or down to the nearest 10 points.

== Three-hand Binokel ==
The following rules for three-hand Binokel are based on Grupp (1994).

=== Dealing ===
A pack of 48 cards is used. The dealer shuffles and offers the cards to the player to the left for cutting, before dealing 15 cards to each player, anticlockwise, in packets of five. After the first or second round of the deal, the dealer places 3 cards face-down on the table to form the tapp or, in Swabian, dabb.

=== Bidding ===
In the first phase of the game, bidding (reizen) takes place for the dabb. Players review the strength of their hands and assess the minimum number of card points they will score by melding and taking tricks. The aim of bidding (also called the auction) is to secure the 'contract', i.e. the right to pick up the dabb, announce the trump suit and call for a card from an opponent (Rufen).

In a three-hand game, forehand, the player to the right of the dealer, says "pass!" (weg) if doubtful of making the minimum score, or starts the bidding (anschreien) with the player to the right, usually beginning with "150!". Rearhand (on the dealer's left) may reply with a bid (Reizen) 10 points higher or pass. Bidding continues in this way between the two players until one passes. Next the dealer gets the chance to bid. The player who bids the highest score wins the auction. The bid is recorded to prevent subsequent disputes. Finally the dabb is turned over for all to see and the auction winner picks it up and decides which cards to discard in exchange.

==== Going out ====
If the highest bidder does not see any chance of achieving the bid value after picking up the dabb, there is the option of 'going out' (abgehen). The player chooses the trump suit to 'go out' in e.g. by saying "out in Leaves" (Ab in Schippen) and reveals the cards at the same time.

A player who goes out may not meld and loses (geht/fährt) the number of points bid; thus the bid is subtracted from his or her score and the opponents score for their melds plus 30 points.

Example: A player announces "I'll go out in Bells" (Ab in Schellen, Swabian: I gang ab en Schellâ). This means that Bells would have been the trump suit. The opponents may still meld "with 30" (30 mit) i.e. scoring for their melds plus a bonus of 30 points. Thus picking the suit to go out in is important to minimise the opponents' likely melds.

=== Discarding ===
The player who is "in the game" (im Spiel), the declarer, must, before melding, discard (drücken) the same number of cards picked up from the dab in order to hold the same number of cards as the other players. Forgetting to do so or discarding the wrong number of cards results in the loss of the game. The declarer loses double in such as case (double the bid value is deducted). This is also the case if a melded card is accidentally discarded (gedrückt).

Special rules about discarding: the Dissle (7 of Trumps) may be melded and discarded. The declarer must inform the other players, however. Sometimes, the declarer must tell the others if trump cards have been discarded and how many .

=== Calling ===
A rule not normally used by serious players but common in family games is 'calling' (Rufen) for a card that the declarer does not hold in order e.g. to improve melds. This must be done before melding begins. If calling is allowed, bidding often begins at 300.

=== Melding ===
The player who has the game (by winning the dabb) is the first to meld, having first announced trumps.

==== Melds ====
Now combinations of cards or melds are placed, which make up a part of the points needed to win. The following melds are possible:

Melds in Binokel
Pairs, Diss and Last Trick		Four/Eight of a Kind	
Diss (7 of trumps turned up, played or declared)	10	Four Unters (of different suits)	40
Last trick	10	Four Obers (of different suits)	60
Pair (Note: Sometimes called a marriage in English (e.g. see Parlett (2008)), but invariably called a pair (Paar) in German.) (O + U or K + Q of any plain suit)	20	Four Kings (of different suits)	80
Trump Pair (2 x O + U or 2 x K + Q of the trump suit)	40	Four Aces (of different suits)	100
Procession or Grand Procession (Note: Parlett (2008) borrows the term 'roundhouse' from the related American game, Pinochle, but the German term Rundgang (Grupp also has Großer Umgang) never has that meaning and (Grand) Procession seems a more apt and accurate translation. Phillips also uses 'round trip' which is also more faithful.) (4 pairs)	240	Eight of a Kind (Note: It is common to exclude eight Tens from scoring as 'eight of a kind'. In addition, many rules refine the scoring scheme as follows: 8 Aces – 1000, 8 Kings – 800, 8 Queens or Obers – 600, 8 Jacks or Unters – 400.)	1000
Binokels		Families	
Binokel (O + U or Q♠ + J♦)	40	Family (A 10 K O U or A 10 K Q J, same suit)	100
Double Binokel (Note: Also called a Grand Binokel (Großes Binokel) by Grupp (1975) and Danyliuk (2017), but this is confusingly similar to the term Großbinokel used by Pieper & Schmidt (1994) for 'eight of a kind' and by Ulmann (1890) and the Altenburger rules for the combination of a Binokel plus the King of Leaves/Spades. German Wikipedia gives Karle as another name for the double Binokel.) (both O + U or Q♠ + J♦)	300	Trump Family (Note: Also called Trump Sequence or Quintmajor.)	150
Grand Binokel (Note: The Altenburger rules (1988) score a Grand Binokel (Großbinokel) at 800 points. However, this is clearly a misprint as all other rules with this combination, e.g. Ulmann (1890), score it at 80.) (K + O + U or K♠ + Q♠ + J♦)	80	Double Family (10 cards of one suit, less 7s)	1,500

Cards can also be used multiple times for melds: an Ober of Leaves, King of Leaves and an Unter of Bells, for example, can be melded as a binokel and a pair. In the same way, four of a kind, of which one card is part of a family, can also be melded. On the other hand, a single Ober or King cannot form a pair with the cards of a family, just as one cannot meld a King and two Obers of a suit as two pairs. The melded points only count if at least one trick has been taken; otherwise the melds are annulled.

==== Procession ====
A player who has four pairs, one in each suit, can meld a so-called procession (Rundgang). It is not a real combination, so there are no special points for it, unlike other combinations such as the double binokel (two single binokels score 300).

However, the experienced player automatically knows that 240 points are awarded for the procession: Four Kings score 80, four Obers score 60 and the trump pair and three normal pairs score 100. If a family is melded at the same time as the procession, the procession only scores 200 (trump) or 220 points (non-trump), since the points for the King and Ober in the family may not count twice.

=== Trick-taking ===
After the melds have been made, tricks are played for. As in the bidding phase, play is anticlockwise and begins with the player who started the bidding, except in the special contracts such as Durch (see below).

The following apply in descending order:

- Farbzwang: players must follow suit.
- Stichzwang: players must win the trick if they can; i. e. play a higher card than the card(s) already played to the trick.
- Trumpfzwang: a player who cannot follow suit must play a trump
- Who played first, wins (Z'erschd g’schbielt, z'erschd g’schdochâ): if two cards of the same value are played, the first one wins.

A trump card automatically beats all cards of another suit.

=== Scoring ===
In the fourth phase, the card points in the tricks are counted. Whoever takes the last trick gets an extra 10 points. When the card points have been totted up, they are rounded up or down to the nearest 10 points.

Players should also check whether the declarer has reached the bid value with the sum of the melded points and the card points from the game. If the bid level is not reached, the declarer is "in the cellar" (in den Keller). The declarer's melds and tricks do not score and twice the bid value is deducted from the declarer's score.

The game comprises a number of deals in which players vie to be first to reach the target score, usually 1,500 points. According to Grupp (1994), each loser pays the winner a sum based on the difference between the loser's own score and the winner's; typically 10pf (now 5¢) per 100 points difference.

== Special contracts ==
The following special contracts may be played.

=== Durch ===
If a player has a particularly good hand, they may announce a durch or Durchmarsch (Swabian: d'r Obârom) which is the equivalent of a slam or march. The aim of durch is to take all 15 tricks. No trump suit is chosen and there are no melds. The player who declares a durch 'comes out' (kommt raus) i.e. leads to the first trick.

A durch scores 1,000 points if played from the hand and 1,500 if played 'open' or 'ouvert' (hingelegten) i.e. if the player puts his or her cards face up on the table before the first trick, because it is clear that no trick will be lost. The rarest form is Open Hand Durch (aufgelegte Durch von der Hand). This is where the declarer puts the cards on the table and without taking the dabb. If an opponent wins a trick, the game is lost and the declarer has twice the points for a win deducted.

=== Bettel ===
In bettel or untendurch (Swabian: d'r Onnârom) the aim is not to take any tricks as in a misère in other games. It is not commonly played in Binokel. No trump suit is chosen, there are no melds and, depending on the area, either the declarer or the on 'in front' (vorne) begins. Untendurch scores 1,000, 1,500 or 500 points depending on the region. However, an untendurch contract is not very common, since the probability of winning it is much less than for durch.

In untendurch, Stichzwang applies, i.e. if you can win the trick, you must!

== Four-hand Binokel and Cross Binokel ==
There are two variants for four players: Four-hand Binokel (Viererspiel) and Cross Binokel (Kreuzbinokel). The following brief description is based on Grupp (1994).

=== Four-hand Binokel ===
This follows the rules of Three-hand Binokel except that the dealer sits out and just receives 200 points for dealing.

=== Cross Binokel ===
This is the most common form, the four players forming two permanent teams of two players for the session, partners sitting opposite one another. Each is dealt eleven cards and four are dealt to the dabb. The game is played as for Three-hand Binokel, except that the two players in a team combine their points.

== Two-hand Binokel ==
The following is based on the rules for two-handed Binokel in the Spielregelnbüchlein aus Altenburg.

=== Dealing ===
Players are dealt 12 cards, the next is turned as trumps—if it is a Seven the dealer receives 10 points—and the remainder placed face down as a talon, half-covering the trump turnup. There is no dabb. Forehand plays to the first trick. There is no compulsion to follow suit or trump as long as the talon is not exhausted. If two cards of the same rank and suit are played to a trick, the first wins. The winner of a trick draws another card from the talon and lets the opponent do likewise, before leading to the next trick.

=== Melds ===
Melds are made during the first part of the game, by a player who has won a trick and is on lead. Only one meld may be declared at a time. Melds may be added to and cards may be used for more than one meld, except that the King and Ober within a family do not count as a pair, nor may a King be paired with two Obers or an Ober with two Kings. Players may play from their hand or from their melds. Possible melds are:

Melds in Two-hand Binokel
Pairs, Diss and Last Trick		Quartets (of different suits)	
Diss (7 of trumps turned up, played or declared)	10	Four Unters/Jacks	40
Last trick	10	Four Obers/Queens	60
Pair (O + U) or (K + Q) of any plain suit	20	Four Kings	80
Trump pair (2 x O + U) or 2 x (K + Q of the trump suit)	40	Four Aces	100
Binokels and Quintmajor		Octets	
Binokel (O + U) or (Q♠ + J♦)	40	Eight Unters/Jacks	400
Grand Binokel (K + O + U) or (K♠ + Q♠ + J♦)	80	Eight Obers/Queens	600
Quintmajor (A 10 K O U) or (A 10 K Q J) of trumps	250	Eight Kings	800
Double Binokel (2 x O + U) or (2 x Q♠ + J♦)	300	Eight Aces	1000

=== Talon exhausted ===
Once the talon is exhausted, players collect their remaining meld cards and add them to their hand. From now on they must follow suit or, if unable to do so, play a trump. The winner of the last trick gets 10 points.

=== Scoring ===
The game is normally played for 1000 points. Scoring of melds is usually done at the time of the meld; card points are totted up after the last trick. However, if one player is approaching 1,000 points, card points should also be mentally added up as they are won, so that a player can announce reaching 1,000 before game end.

== Bibliography ==
- Goldschmidt, M. (1849). "Bruchstücke aus einem Reisetagebuch". Nordische Telegraph. Vol. 1, no. 14. Leipzig: Carl B. Lorch. pp. 170–171.
- Revue Suisse (in French). Vol. 21 (28th Leidecker, Neuchatel ed.). 1856.
- Müller, Wilhelm (1884). "Der Koffer der Mrs. Lemke. Reiseskizze" in Puck, Vol. 9, Keppler & Schwarzmann, New York. pp. 42–43.
- Erweitertes Spielregelbüchlein aus Altenburg (in German) (8th ed.). Leipzig: Verlag Altenburger Spielkartenfabrik. 1988.
- Danyliuk, Rita (2017). 1x1 der Kartenspiele, 19th ed., Humboldt, Hanover. ISBN 978-3-86910-367-9
- Grupp, Claus D (1994). Doppelkopf – Schafkopf – Tarock (in German) (Original ed.). Niedernhausen: Falken. ISBN 3-8068-2015-5.
- Grupp, Claus D (1979). Karten-spiele (in German) (rev. and exp. ed.). Niederhausen: Falken. ISBN 3-8068-2001-5.
- Kastner, Hugo; Kador Folkvord, Gerald (2005). Die große Humboldt-Enzyklopädie der Kartenspiele (in German). Baden-Baden: Humboldt. ISBN 978-3-89994-058-9.
- Parlett, David (2008). The Penguin book of card games. London: Penguin. ISBN 978-0-141-03787-5.
- Pieper, Sven and Bärbel Schmidt (1994). Kartenspiele, Reclams Universalbibliothek, Vol. 4216, Stuttgart.
- Pierer, H.A. (1857). Pierer's Universal-Lexicon der Vergangenheit und Gegenwart (in German). Vol. 2. Altenburg: Pierer.
- Reclam jun., P. (1891). Plutarchs ausgewählte moralische Abhandlungen, Volume 2, Plutarchus.
- Scarne, John (1965). Scarne on Cards. New York: Signet.
- Ulmann, S. (1890). Das Buch der Familienspiele. A. Hartleben, Vienna, Munich and Pest.
