= Bauernschnapsen =

Card game

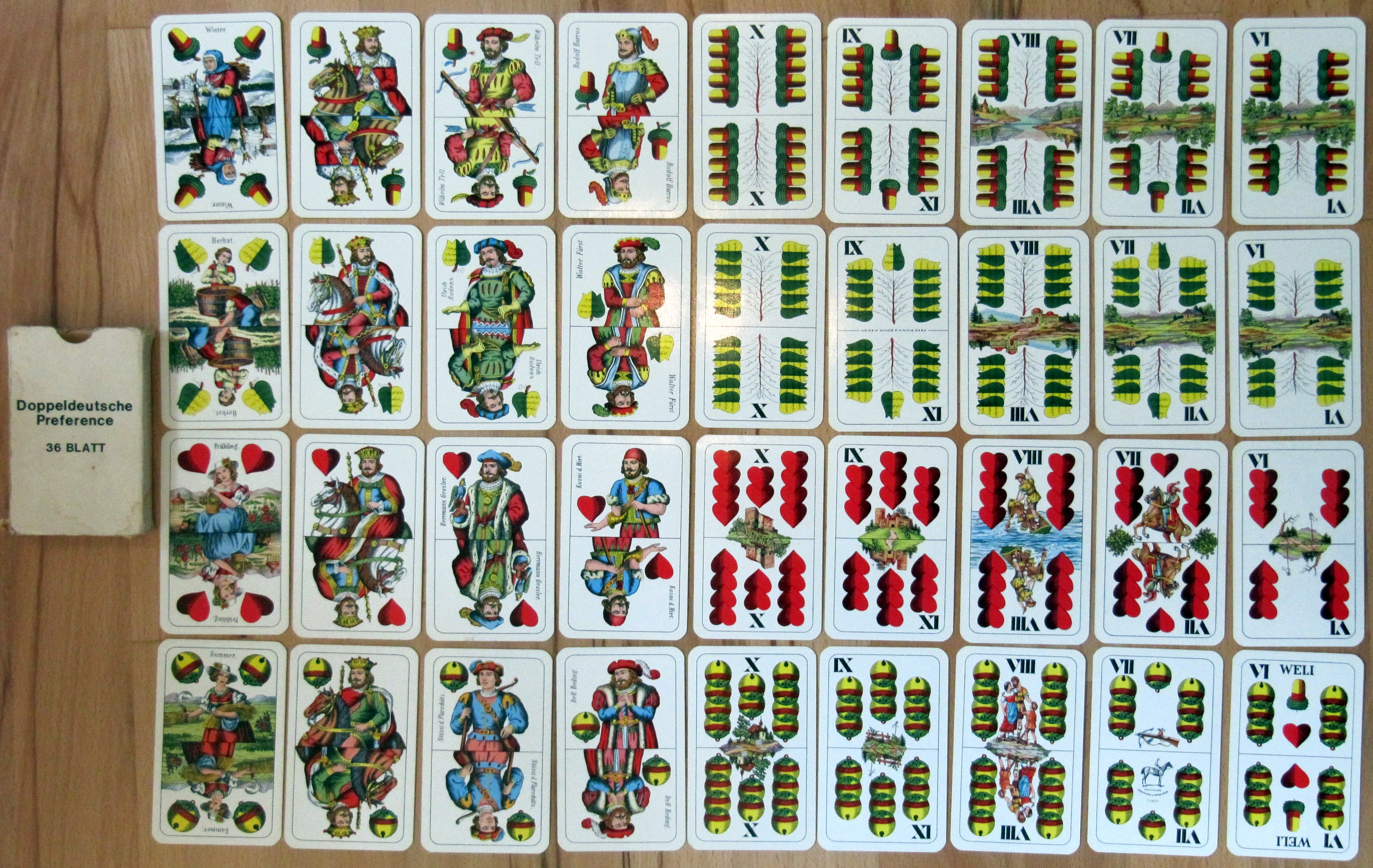
- A William Tell or doppeldeutsche pattern pack
- Origin: Austria
- Type: Point-trick
- Players: 4
- Cards: 20
- Deck: German (William Tell pattern)
- Play: Clockwise

Related games
- Schnapsen • Gaigel • Sechsundsechzig • Dreierschnapsen

The card game of Bauernschnapsen (also called Viererschnapsen) is an expanded form of the popular Austrian card game of Schnapsen, played by four players. This variant of Schnapsen is played throughout the whole of Austria.

== General rules ==
Bauernschnapsen is played with a 20-card packet of Schnapsen cards by two teams of two, the partners sitting opposite one another across the card table. Team membership may be renounced, but none of the players may use their experience of which cards their partner has in their hand, and they also do not known which cards he has. The aim is to win 24 points and the game ends as soon as one team has achieved that. In regional variants, scores start at 24 and count down to null (zero) points and the team that reaches null first is the winner. the losing team receives a Bummerl. If the losing team scores no points, it receives a Schneider, which counts as two Bummerls. If a team leads 23:0 and loses it receives a Retourschneider (or Schuster, Rücker), which counts as four Bummerls. Another rule is that the first trick of each team must remain visible to all the players for the whole game, irrespective of the type of game being played.

=== Cards ===
The same cards are used as for other variants of Schnapsen: either French suited or German suited cards (William Tell pattern). There are 4 suits: in French playing cards and doppeldeutsche (William Tell pattern) cards they are Hearts (Herz), Diamonds (Karo), Spades (Pik) and Clubs (Kreuz or, regionally, Treff). In the doppeldeutsche variants the suits are regionally also known as Hearts (Herz), Bells (Schelle), Leaves (Blatt, Grün or Laub) and Acorns (Eichel). There are five different cards per suit:

Suits of the playing cards
French pack				
German (doppeldeutsche) pack				
Names of the suits	Hearts (Herz)	Diamonds / Bells (Karo / Schelle)	Spades / Leaves (Pik / Laub)	Clubs / Acorns (Kreuz / Eichel)

In each suit there are five cards: the Ace (Ass) (regionally the Deuce or Daus), the 10, the King, the Ober (or the Dame, regionally Manderl) and the Unter (or the Bube, regional Bauer).

Value of the playing cards
Name	Points
Ace/Deuce	11
Ten	10
King	4
Ober	3
Unter	2

=== Start and finish ===
The dealer shuffles the card pack and the player to his right cuts the pack at least once or 'knocks' with his fist on the pack to indicate he is happy not to cut. Next three cards are dealt to each player in clockwise order, beginning with the player on the dealer's left, the caller (Rufer). The caller must choose a trump suit (Trumpffarbe or, regionally, Atoutfarbe) from his first three cards, before receiving the remaining two cards. Then each player is dealt a packet of two more cards in the same order. If the caller cannot or will not decide which suit will be trumps, he can draw one of the two remaining cards and turn it over for everyone to see; the suit of this card is then the trump suit. If the player right of the dealer has knocked on the card pack, each player is given all five cards at once in the same clockwise order. The caller is initially dealt three, in order to decide the trump suit, and then a further two.

The trump suit beats all other cards in most cases. If the first three cards that the caller is dealt consists of three Unters (regionally Buben or Bauern), he may insist that the cards are reshuffled and redealt.

After the caller has called trumps, the player who has bid the highest contract, may play it. In one regional variant, the caller must first decide whether to bid a contract or to pass; in the latter case the next player to the left (clockwise) has the right to bid a contract or pass.

In several contracts that may be declared, the declared trump suit becomes irrelevant and all suits are deemed equal in rank. Within a suit, the higher card beats the lower, and only cards of the trump suit may beat cards of a different suit. If a player e.g. plays an Unter of Leaves, a King or a Deuce (Ace) of another colour cannot beat it, but only be discarded (zugegeben) – with the exception of the trump suit if trumps are valid.

At the end of each hand the caller becomes the dealer; he shuffles, lets the player to the right cut or knock and deals the cards as described above.

Which special contracts are permitted, varies to some extent from region to region. It is common to have the Schnapser, the Gang (or Gangl) and the Bauernschnapser (Bauer). The Bettler contracts are very controversial in conservative circles, because they make normal games the exception rather than the rule.

=== Overview ===
An overview of the contracts is given in the table below. Alternative regional names are shown in brackets. The colour code is: yellow for normal Schnapsen games, red for negative games (taking no tricks) and green for 'slam' games (taking all tricks).

Contract (Spiel)	Eligible bidder(s)	First lead	Trumps	Aim	Points
Normal game (Normal Spiel)	Forehand	Forehand	Yes	Be first to score ≥66	1 if opponents score ≥33
Normal game (Normal Spiel)	Forehand	Forehand	Yes	Be first to score ≥66	2 if opponents score <33
Normal game (Normal Spiel)	Forehand	Forehand	Yes	Be first to score ≥66	3 if opponents take no tricks
Bettler (Fechter)	Anyone	Declarer	No	Lose all tricks	4
Assenbettler (Zehnerloch)	Anyone	Declarer	No	Lose all tricks; Aces low	5
Ass Bettler (Ass-Fechter)	Anyone	Declarer	No	Lose all tricks; holding an Ace	5
Schnapser (Drei-Stich)	Forehand or partner	Forehand	Yes	Win 1st 3 tricks with ≥66	6
Plauderer	Anyone	Declarer	No	Lose all tricks; opponents play ouvert	7
Gang (Gangl, Land or Ring)	Anyone	Declarer	No	Win all 5 tricks	9
Zehnergang (Zehnerloch, Zehnerhittn, Zehnerland, Zehnerring)	Anyone	Declarer	No	Win all 5 tricks; Aces low	10
Bauernschnapser	Forehand or partner	Forehand	Yes	Win all 5 tricks	12
Bauernloch	Forehand or partner	Forehand	Yes	Win all five tricks; Aces low	12
Kontraschnapser (Kontra-Drei-Stich)	Opponent of forehand	Forehand	Yes	Win 1st 3 tricks with ≥66	12
Farbenringerl (Farbringerl, Farbenjodler, Herrenringerl, Farbengang or Farbenring)	Anyone but forehand	not played	–	Hold 5 cards of one suit	18
Trumpfringerl (Herrenschnapser, Herrenjodler or Trumpffarbenringerl)	Forehand	not played	–	Hold all 5 cards of trump suit	24
Kontrabauernschnapser	Opponent of forehand	Forehand	Yes	Win all 5 tricks	24

Players may double; this is known as spritzen or, regionally, flecken or schießen. A game may be doubled (gespritzt) by the opponents, redoubled by the declarer(s) (zurückgespritzt) and doubled again by the opponents.

== Contracts ==
=== Normal game ===
If no contract is bid, a 'normal game' (normales Spiel) is played, sometimes called a Rufer ('caller'), whereby the caller plays the first card. The aim is, together with one's partner, to score 66 card points or to win the last trick. If the losing team does not win a single trick, the winning team scores 3 game points. If the losing team score fewer than 33 points, the winning team gets 2 game points. If the losing team scores 33 or more, the winning team just gets one game point.

In Bauernschnapsen players must follow suit and attempt to win the trick, as in Zweierschnapsen, once the talon has been used up or after it has been closed (zugedreht):

1. If a player has a higher card of the same suit, it must be played. If that is not possible,
2. a lower card of the same suit must be played. If that is not possible,
3. a trump must be played. If that is not possible,
4. any card may be discarded.

The player who wins the trick must lead to the next trick unless his team won the game as a result of winning the trick.

If a player, whose turn it is, has a King and an Ober (regionally Mandl or Ober) of the same suit, he may declare a Zwanziger ("Twenty-er"), which wins 20 points. If the King and Ober are of the trump suit, he may declare a Vierziger ("Forty-er") and win 40 points. One of the two cards must be played, usually the Ober is chosen. They must win the trick when they can. If the team gets no tricks in the same game, the Twenty-ers and Forty-ers do not count. If the team wins at least one trick, the Twenty-ers and Forty-ers count even if the tricks were won by the other team.

=== Bettler (or Fechter) ===
The aim of Bettler ("Beggar") or, regionally, Fechter ("Swordsman") is not to take any tricks. All suits are equal. As in all the contracts, players must follow suit and try to win the trick. In one regional variant the partner of the player who has announced Bettler is not allowed to play and must take a pause. The winning team scores 4 points.

=== Schnapser (or Drei-Stich) ===
In Schnapser or Drei-Stich ("Three Trick") only the caller can declare and he must play the first card. If anyone beats his card, the team loses. If his own partner beats the caller's card, the game is also lost. The game is won in one of the following ways:

1. The caller must achieve 66 points in the first 3 tricks.
2. The caller must take exactly one trick and then announce a Forty-er (Vierziger) to achieve 66 points.
3. The caller must take exactly two tricks and then announce a Twenty-er (Zwanziger) to achieve 66 points.

The caller does not have to decide which of these options to go for before the start of the Schnapser game, but just says "I'll play a Schnapser" (Ich spiele einen Schnapser).

There is an uncommon regional variant in which the partner is allowed to win a trick, known as Schnapser mit Mann. The winning team scores 6 points.

=== Gangl (Ring or Land) ===
A Gang (regionally Gangl, Durchmarsch, Land, Ringerl, Ring or Neuner) may be announced by any player. All suits are the same value. The aim is to take all the tricks. The one who declares Gang plays the first card. If the declarer's partner takes a trick the game is lost. The winning team gets 9 points.

=== Bauernschnapser ===
As in Gang the aim is to take all the tricks. Unlike Gang, however, the trump suit announced by the caller counts, so it is difficult for players other than the caller to declare this contract. The winning team scores 12 points.

=== Kontraschnapser (or Kontra-Drei-Stich) ===
The Kontraschnapser ("Counter-Schnapser") or Kontra-Drei-Stich ("Counter-Three Tricks") can be played by an opponent of the caller. The trump suit declared by the caller counts, the caller starts and the declarer must win the game.

The game may be won in the following ways:

1. The declarer must win 66 points in the first 3 tricks.
2. The declarer must win exactly one trick and then announce a Forty-er (Vierziger) to achieve 66 points.
3. The caller must take exactly two tricks and then announce a Twenty-er (Zwanziger) to achieve 66 points.

The winning team scores 12 points. In a regional variant the caller's partner can announce "Schnapser together" (Schnapser zusammen) or "Friendship-Schnapser" (Freundschaftsschnapser) which may win 6 points.

=== Farbringerl (or Farbenjodler, Herrenringerl) ===
Farbringerl is also called Herrengangl or Farbensolo. If a player has all five cards of one suit, he may declare Farbringerl. Atout does not apply. It earns exactly 18 points. Because this game is won (or lost) by declaring, even though it is impossible that the opposing players could beat them, it is usual that the game is won by placing the cards on the table. Because this special contract, as explained, cannot be played out, many clubs exclude this contract from their 'contract catalogue for 4-player Bauernschnapsen.

=== Kontrabauernschnapser ===
Kontrabauernschnapser is similar to Bauernschnapser: the aim is to take all the tricks, the trump suit being named by the caller. The caller plays the first card and the declarer must win all the tricks. The winning team scores 24 points; thus the game is ended by a Kontrabauernschnapser.

=== Herrenschnapser (or Herrenjodler, Trumpffarbenringerl) ===
If the caller holds all the cards of the Atout suit, he may declare a Herrenschnapser. This game counts for 24 points. Like Farbenring this special contract cannot be played out. As a result, many clubs exclude it from their 'contract catalogue for 4-player Bauernschnapsen.

=== Flecken (or Spritzen, Schießen) ===
If the opposing team believes that the declarer will lose the game, they can double the stakes (known as spritzen or, regionally, flecken, schießen or kontern). The contract is then worth double points. With the announcement Retour or Kontra or Zruckgspritzt the player (or his partner) may double it again, if he is nevertheless sure that they can win the game. This can be responded to again with the declaration Re or nuamoi zruckgspritzt, whereupon a win would bring eight times the actual number of points - but this kind of thing does not happen very often. Every contract can be gefleckt, both normal ones as well as special contracts.

If the team that is leading could reach zero, their opponents will often call "auf Stand", regardless of the quality of their own hands. They do this because doubling makes no difference if the team loses, but if they are lucky it may increase their chances of winning.

=== Special regional contracts ===
==== Assenbettler (Zehnerloch) ====
As in Bettler the aim of Assenbettler (regionally Zehnerloch), is not to take any tricks, all suits having the same value. As in all other contracts, it is compulsory to follow suit and win the trick if possible. The ace/deuce becomes the lowest card, so that the sequence is: 10, King, Ober, Unter, Ace/Deuce. The winning team scores five points.

==== Ass-Bettler (or Ass-Fechter) ====
As in Bettler and Assenbettler the aim of Ass-Bettler (regionally Ass-Fechter) is not to take any tricks, all suits being equal in value. As in all other contracts, it is compulsory to follow suit and win the trick if possible. The player who announces Ass-Bettler must have at least one ace in his hand which makes it more difficult for him not to take a trick. The team that wins Ass-Bettler scores five points.

==== Plauderer ====
There is no special contract in Bauernschnapsen that is played so differently from round to round and from region to region as Plauderer.

(a) Like Bettler/Fechter, where the opposing players may team up before the first game (they may look at each other's the cards). If the player succeeds in not taking a single trick, the team receives 7 points.

(b) Like Bettler/Fechter, with the opposing players laying their cards face up in front of them after the first trick and the game being continued without the players communicating with each other.

(c) Like Bettler/Fechter, with the declarer laying his cards face up in front of him after the first trick, but the opposing players keeping their cards hidden and continuing the game without the players communicating with each other.

==== Zehnergang (or Zehnerloch, Zehnerhittn, Zehnerland) ====
As in Gang, the goal is to take all the tricks, all suits being equal. The Ace is the lowest card, so the order of rank is: Tens, King, Ober, Unter, Ace. Zehnergang is not always an option in all areas and is therefore one of the special regional contracts in Bauernschnapsen. Players should be clarified before the beginning of the game whether Zehnergang is allowed. There are two regional differences:

1. If Gang (9 points) and Zehnergang (ten points) are announced, Gang is played.
2. If Gang (9 points) and Zehnergang (ten points) are announced, Zehnergang is played.

The winning team scores 10 points.

==== Bauernloch ====
Bauernloch is a combination of Bauernschnapsen and Zehnerloch (or Zehnerloch, Zehnerhitten, Zehnerland). As in Zehnergang, the aim is to win all the tricks, but the exception that invalidates the trump is not used. Like Bauernschnapsen, trump cards keep their higher position. The increased difficulty of this contract is reflected in the points. Bauernloch can only be played by the person who chose the trump suit. He must take all the tricks and, if successful, wins 12 points.

== Talonschnapsen (3 players) ==
Talonschnapsen is also called Dreierschnapsen. The basic rules are the same as Bauernschnapsen, but there are only 3 players and thus everyone plays for himself. Each player has a hand of 6, not 5, cards, the 2 remaining cards form the talon.

The dealer deals 3 cards to each player; forehand, left of the dealer, calls trumps (Atout), then 2 cards are placed face down as a talon (hence the name), then a further 3 cards are dealt to each player.

Bidding is as in Bauernschnapsen, beginning with the one who called trumps (the 'caller'). The player who bids the highest contract may now pick up the talon and must replace 2 cards again. If no-one bids a contract, a normal game is played, as described above, in which case the caller may look at the talon and, if he wants, exchange the talon cards for two of his own. Either way, the cards remain face down on the table.

In addition to the possibility to raise the originally announced game, there are two rules, which are handled differently regionally and which should therefore be clarified before the game starts. First, the caller (who announced a contract first) can raise it again before picking up the talon, if one of his teammates has bid a higher contract than his. Example: Caller (player A) bids a Schnapser, B passes, but C bids a higher contract. A hopes that the "right" cards are in the talon - and now raises to a Bauernschnapser. The other rule, which is not generally valid, refers to raising after picking up the hand: one of the players has "prevailed" with his contract, looks at the talon and thus gets a hand that allows him a higher contract, so now he announces this contract (before playing the first card, of course!). If a normal game is played, the caller could announce another contract in this case.

If the talon is not needed, you can also play without talon cards. When two players call out a contract, the player who can play without the talon cards has the precedence.

Whoever then plays his announcement must now win his game against the other two.

Points: If the player finishes his declared game, he alone gets the points, if he doesn't win, each of the other two get the points. The game also ends here at 24 points. There is always a "Bummerl" or "Schneider", who has the fewest points of the three, if two players have the same number of points, both have a "Bummerl" or "Schneider". Regional variant: Any player who does not reach 24 points has a "Bummerl" - this can even happen if you win a game with your partner. Flecken is also possible in Talonschnapsen: a "flecken", "spritzen" or "schießen" may not be rescinded one it has been announced. It can be announced until the first card has been played, regardless of whether the talon has been viewed or not! In a normal game, the caller must win at least 66 points; the talon cards are not counted along with the tricks he has won.

The announced contracts do not differ except for the Schnapser and Farbenring from those of the 4-player or Bauernschnapsen. Schnapser in Talonschnapsen consists of 4 tricks, in order to win the 12 cards, which can also be achieved in Bauernschnapsen. In double games, the talon is given to the person calling the figure, the caller leads and plays against the figure with the third player. In Farbenring, the player has all 5 cards of a certain suit and must make all 6 tricks.

== Literature ==
- Hugo Kastner, Gerald Kador Folkvord: The große Humboldtenzyklopädie der Kartenspiele. Humboldt, Baden-Baden 2005, ISBN 3-89994-058-X
