= Marjolet =

French card game

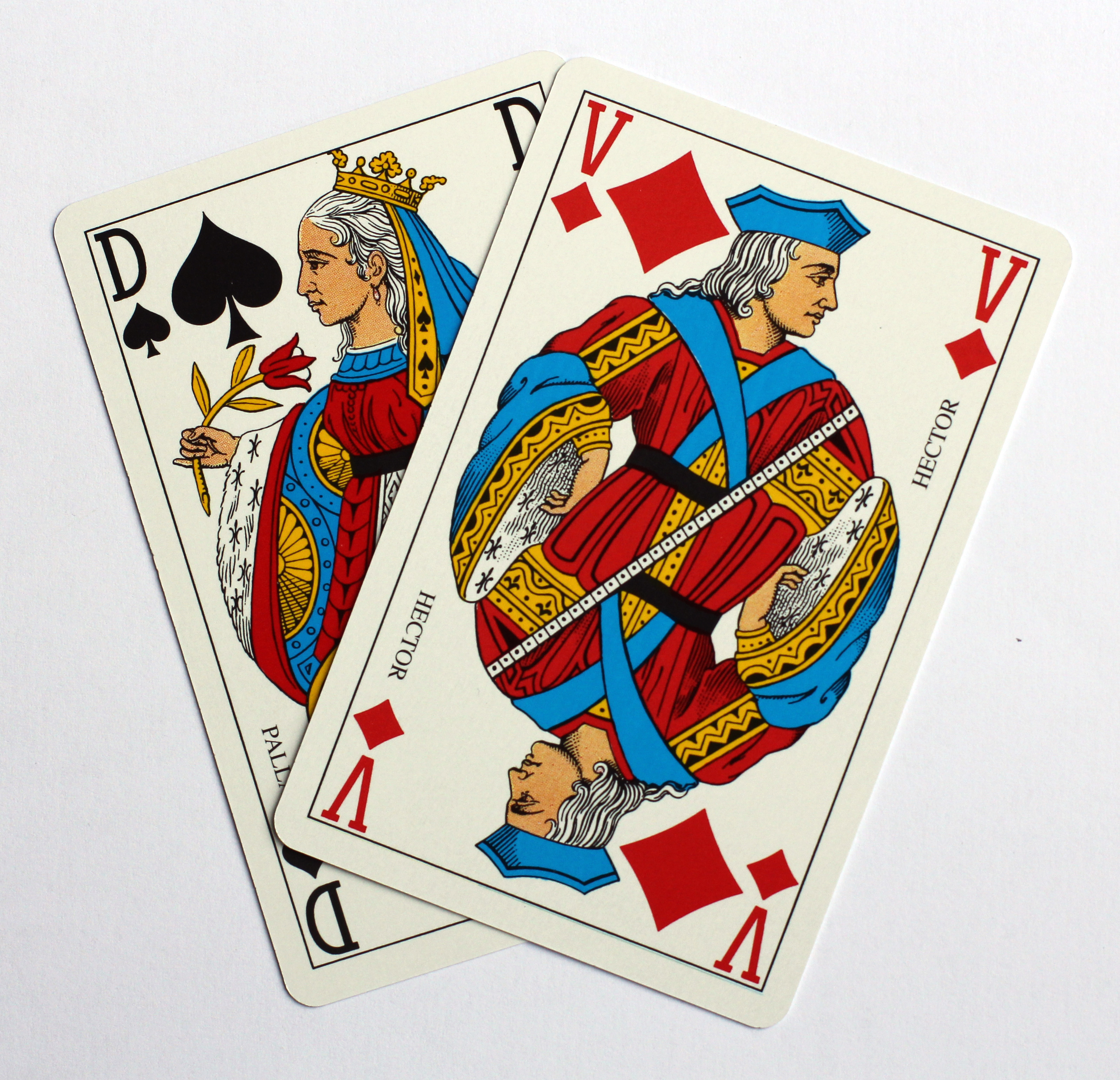
- A marjolet when Diamonds are trumps
- Origin: France
- Type: Trick-taking
- Players: 2
- Cards: 32
- Deck: Piquet
- Rank (high→low): A 10 K Q J 9 8 7

Related games
- Bezique • Binokel • Pinochle

Marjolet (French pronunciation: [maʁʒɔlɛ]) is a French 6-card trick-and-draw game for two players using a 32-card piquet pack. It is of the Queen-Jack type, and thus a relative of Bezique and Pinochle, albeit simpler. The trump Jack is called the Marjolet from which the name of the game derives.

== History ==
The game is an offshoot of Bezique which appeared in Paris in 1847 as a "new game". Marjolet itself is first recorded as a game in 1878, but the term is older and meant "a young beau; a foppish youth."

== Rules ==
Each player receives 6 cards in batches of 2 or 3. The next card is turned face-up to determine the trump suit and put crosswise under the stock. If it happens to be a seven, the dealer scores 10 points.

Eldest hand leads to the first trick. While the stock contains cards, players can play any card they want. Once the stock is depleted they must follow suit, if possible, and win the trick, if possible. A player who cannot follow suit after the stock is depleted must trump if possible. While the stock lasts, the winner of a trick, followed by the other player, takes a card from the stock before leading to the next trick.

Upon winning a trick and before drawing a card, a player may declare one or more melds. Cards used for melding are displayed openly on the table but can still be used as hand cards and can be used for further melds. The only restriction is that one may not meld exactly the same set of cards more than once. Apart from royal marriages, there are also the marjolet marriages involving the marjolet (jack of trumps) and any queen.

The player who holds the seven of trumps (the dix) may trade it for the turn-up card, prior to the exhaustion of the stock, only after winning a trick. Doing this is worth 10 points. If there is no exchange, playing the dix to a trick scores 10 points. If the initial upcard happens to be the dix, the dealer scores 10 points.

The player who loses the tenth trick, exhausting the stock and drawing the turned up trump, scores 10 points. At that point melding is over. Both players take up their melded cards and hold them normally. The winner of the final trick of the hand also scores 10 points, unless that player wins all six tricks after the exhaustion of the stock, in which case 60 points are scored.

To the various bonus points accrued so far, the card-points in tricks won are added: each ace and each 10 taken in a trick is worth 10 points, with other taken cards having no value. The objective is to score 500 points over several hands.

== Melds ==
The various melds and their scores are as shown in the table below:

| Score | Meld | Score | Meld |
|---|---|---|---|
| 100 | 4 Aces | 40 | K+Q in trumps |
| 80 | 4 Tens | 20 | K+Q in other suit |
| 60 | 4 Kings | 40 | J+Q in trumps |
| 40 | 4 Queens | 20 | trump J + other Q |

== Variations ==
- The non-royal marriages scoring 20 points are between Jack and Queen in the same non-trump suit rather than trump Jack and non-trump Queen.

== History and etymology ==
The term 'marjolet' is one of contempt, popularly said of a little young man who pretends to be a gentleman, or one who pretends to be an expert on anything.
