= Pinochle =

Card game

- The jack of diamonds and queen of spades are the "pinochle" meld of pinochle.
- Type: Trick-taking
- Players: 4 in partnerships or 3 individually; variants exist for 2–6 or 8 players
- Skills: Strategy; Social skills; Teamwork; Card counting
- Cards: 48 (double 24 card deck) or 80 (quadruple 20 card deck)
- Deck: French
- Rank (high→low): A 10 K Q J 9
- Play: Clockwise
- Playing time: 1 to 5 hours
- Chance: Medium

Related games
- Bezique, Marjolet, Binokel

Pinochle (English: /ˈpiːnʌkəl/), also called pinocle or penuchle, is a trick-taking ace–ten card game, typically for two to four players and played with a 48-card deck. It is derived from the card game bezique. Players score points by trick-taking and by forming combinations of characters into melds.

It is considered part of a "trick-and-meld" category which includes the game belote. Each hand is played in three phases: bidding, melds, and tricks. The standard game today is called "partnership auction pinochle".

== History ==
Pinochle is thought to have two possible origins. One is that it is a cousin of Binokel, with both games evolving from the game of bezique. A second alternative is that pinochle developed from the Swiss and, later, South German game of Binocle or Binokel, which is a descendant of bezique.

The word pinochle has several different potential derivations. It may come from the French word binocle literally meaning "two eyes", or "eyeglasses" or "binoculars". This was a reference to the mythical notion that the German game of Binocle was invented with a special deck, where the Queen of Spades and Jack of Diamonds were pictured in side profile, with just one eye each. There are also suggestions that the word pinochle comes from bis (until) and Knöchel (knuckle), because originally the game ended when a player rapped their knuckles on the table. The term may also be related to the French word binage for the combination of cards called "binocle". This latter pronunciation of the game was adopted by German speakers.

German immigrants brought the game of Binokel to America in the last quarter of the 19th century, where it was mispronounced and misspelled "pinochle." Pinochle was the favorite card game of American Jewish and Irish immigrants. Skat was the preferred game of a majority of German immigrants. Auction Pinochle for three players has some similarities with the German game Skat, although the bidding is more similar to that of bid whist.

During the 19 months when the USA was involved in World War I, the city of Syracuse, New York, outlawed the playing of pinochle in a gesture of anti-German sentiment. It was also temporarily banned in some other US cities as a result of its German heritage, but has since regained popularity.

== Deck ==
A pinochle deck consists of two copies of each of the 9, 10, jack, queen, king, and ace cards of all four suits, for 48 cards per deck. Aces are always considered high. Pinochle follows a nonstandard card ordering. The complete ordering from highest to lowest is A, 10, K, Q, J, 9. The game can also be played using standard ranking with a simple change to scoring.

Originally, the deck had to be composed by combining two poker, piquet or euchre decks and removing unneeded cards. A piquet deck does not have the 2–6, making it easier to modify, and a euchre deck is exactly half a pinochle deck. With the game's popularity in the United States in the early 1900s, a single boxed deck with the necessary cards was marketed. These specialized pinochle decks are now widely available in similar styles to common 52-card counterparts.

Variants of pinochle can be played with five, six, eight or more players. These larger variations can combine two pinochle decks called a "double deck". The double deck can also be used when playing with four players; hand sizes, average scores and minimum bids are doubled.

== Partnership auction pinochle ==
=== Dealing ===
The game is played with a deck of 48 cards and four players. One player is the dealer.

After the shuffle, the dealer will offer a cut to the player on their right, then distribute the cards. All the cards are dealt in partnership pinochle. For odd numbers of players like three, a "widow's hand" (also called a "kitty", "talon", or "stock") of cards remains. Traditionally, the deal is done clockwise, dealing a packet of three or four cards at a time, starting with the player to the left (the eldest hand) and ending with the dealer. The deal rotates clockwise, so the dealer's left-hand opponent will deal next.

Some versions include a rule that a player being dealt five nines constitutes a misdeal, and the cards must be redealt. A variation of this stipulates that if someone is dealt five nines, they must also have no aces to constitute a misdeal, or if one has six nines and up to one ace.

=== Auction pinochle ===
In auction pinochle, players bid for the points they predict their hand could earn. The highest bidder earns the right to declare the trump suit. One of the players, usually the player to the left of the dealer, or the dealer themselves, is obligated to open with a first bid. The size of bids is based on the point scale and number of decks used; traditionally, points are in multiples of 10, thus a minimum opening bid might be agreed to be 100 or 250.

Many alternate scoring rules drop the unnecessary trailing zero. In that case, bids of 10 and 25, respectively, have the same values. When a player has the turn to bid, the player may either bid or pass.

A popular variation for four (or three) player pinochle involves dealing a 4 card kitty (3 or 6 cards for three players), with the bid winner taking the kitty and discarding 4 (3 or 6) cards from his hand. The point value of the discards can sometimes be added to the bid winner's total trick count or not, depending on the pre-established rules. In three player games the 6 card kitty can often lead to very competitive and extravagant bidding.

Each bid must be greater than the previous one, and be a multiple of 10 or 25 (if playing without trailing zeroes, the bid must be one or two greater respectively). When a player passes, they can no longer bid. The auction ends when all subsequent players in rotation have passed after the last bid. The last bid becomes the "contract". The player that made this final bid will then declare trump in the suit that is desired. In some house rules, trump cannot be declared in any suit not containing a "run", "marriage" or "dix" meld.

In order for the winning bidder to win the hand, the combined total of melding and trick points must be equal to or greater than the winning bid. Thus bidding involves anticipating the points that will be accumulated from melds and from the points accumulated from winning tricks. If the combined score is lower than the bid, then the bidding team or player has been "set". This means that the total bid amount is subtracted from the total game score, often accompanied by losing the points scored in meld for that hand as well. This can result in a negative score.

A related though different style of bidding is for the players to bid individually, and partners' bids are then summed. The winning bid only decides trump; both (or all) teams' bids become their contract, meaning any team can score or be set. This creates a more balanced game.

=== Passing cards ===
In some versions of pinochle, after the bid has been taken and trump declared in a partnership game, the bid winning team exchanges cards. It may be two, three, or four cards, depending on the version of the game. The partner of the bid winner passes first. The objective of the partner is either to add to the total points in meld or to pass trick-winning cards.

After receiving the cards, the bid winner examines what will create the strongest hand and then discards an equal number of cards back to their partner. Variations are for the bid winner and partner to exchange the designated number of cards simultaneously, or for no passing to occur.

=== Melding ===
Melding consists of displaying specific combinations of cards to all players. Typically this is done by placing the combination of cards face up on the playing surface until all players have had the opportunity to examine them. All players meld after the bid winner shows meld first.

The types of melds include "arounds", "marriages", "flushes" and "pinochles". These melds are placed under "headings" where a card which is melded under a particular heading can be used again under another heading, but cannot be melded again under the same heading.

The group melds containing four of the same face cards – ace, king, queen or jack – must include one card from each of the different suits. They are scored as follows:

- "100 aces" or "aces around" – four aces of different suits – 100 or 10 points
- "80 kings" or "kings around" – four kings of different suits – 80 or 8 points
- "60 queens" or "queens around" – four queens of different suits – 60 or 6 points
- "40 jacks" or "jacks around" – four jacks of different suits – 40 or 4 points
- "1000 aces" or "aces abound" – all eight aces – 1,000 or 100 points
- "800 kings" or "kings abound" – all eight kings – 800 or 80 points
- "600 queens" or "queens abound" – all eight queens – 600 or 60 points
- "400 jacks" or "jacks abound" – all eight jacks – 400 or 40 points

The marriages and flush are the "sequence melds":

- "Trump marriage" – king and queen of trump suit – 40 or 4 points, 80 or 8 for double. In some variations, a double marriage in trump is worth 400 or 40 points.
- "Marriage" – king and queen of a (same) suit other than trump – 20 or 2 points, 40 or 4 for double
- "Flush", "family", "rope", "book", "straight", or "run" – A, 10, K, Q, and J of trump suit only – 150 or 15 points. Similar to the arounds, a double run – or two runs in trump in the same hand – is worth 1,500 points or 150 points.

A marriage in each suit is worth 240 or 24 total points, which is nothing more than the sum of the marriages, plus kings around and queens around. As a shortcut, this is called a "roundtable", "marriages around", "round house", or a "round robin".

The pinochle and dix are the "special melds".

- "Pinochle" – jack of diamonds and queen of spades – 40 or 4 points
- "Double pinochle" – both jacks of diamonds and both queens of spades – 300 or 30 points
- "Dix" – (pronounced "deece" /diːs/) nine of trumps – 10 or 1 points each

In the most common form of the game (see variations below), any one card may be used in only one meld of each type. Thus, a queen can be used in one marriage with one king, regardless whether the player has the other king of the same suit. A queen can be used to score a marriage and a pinochle if the player also has the correct jack.

After the melds are displayed, the points are counted and each player totals their individual meld scores.

Meld name	Example	Point value	Simplified
Run in trump	(A 10 K Q J)	150	15
Double run in trump	(A A 10 10 K K Q Q J J)	1500	150
Marriage in trump	(K Q)	40	4
Dix in trump	(9)	10	1
Hundred aces	(A♠ A♥ A♦ A♣)	100	10
Thousand aces	(A♠ A♠ A♥ A♥ A♦ A♦ A♣ A♣)	1000	100
Eighty kings	(K♠ K♥ K♦ K♣)	80	8
Eight hundred kings	(K♠ K♠ K♥ K♥ K♦ K♦ K♣ K♣)	800	80
Sixty queens	(Q♠ Q♥ Q♦ Q♣)	60	6
Six hundred queens	(Q♠ Q♠ Q♥ Q♥ Q♦ Q♦ Q♣ Q♣)	600	60
Forty jacks	(J♠ J♥ J♦ J♣)	40	4
Four hundred jacks	(J♠ J♠ J♥ J♥ J♦ J♦ J♣ J♣)	400	40
Marriage in non-trump	(K Q)	20	2
Pinochle	(J♦ Q♠)	40	4
Double pinochle	(J♦ J♦ Q♠ Q♠)	300	30

Because all of these values are multiples of ten, one can arrive at simplified values by removing the trailing zero from each point total. For instance, a pinochle has a simplified score of 4, a double Pinochle would score 30.

=== Playing tricks ===
In playing cards for tricks, there are strict rules of forced play, which limit a player's ability to strategically retain high cards. The high bidder leads the play with the first card, which can be any card in the contract winner's hand just like basic Whist, although some rules require the first card led to be a trump card. Then there are two variations of following suit depending if you are playing post-1945 or pre-1945 rules.

In pre-1945 rules, every player must follow the lead suit if possible. Usually every player must play a winning card against those played so far, if it is possible to do so, even when the current player expects a later player to win the hand with a better card. The only exception is if a player played a trump card when trump was not the suit led. In that case, those following that player may play any card of the lead suit, since they must follow the lead suit but are already losing to the player who played trump.

Likewise, if a player cannot follow suit, but has trump, they must play trump. Again, if a player does not have any cards of the lead suit, and can play a trump card higher than any other trump played so far, the player must do so, even if the player expects that a later player will beat the card. If another trump has already been played that a player cannot beat, then they can play any trump in their hand, but they still must play a trump card if they can. Only when a player has no cards in suit, and has no trump, can the player choose to play any card in their hand.

Most books of post-1945 rules say that unless trump is led, there is no requirement to try to win the trick. It is only when trump is led that "heading" the trick is mandatory. In pinochle circles and tournaments the post-1945 rules are played about half of the time, according to Pagat and Hoyle.

If two identical cards are played, the first one outranks the second.

After the first trick, the winner of each trick leads the first card for the next trick, until all the cards are played.

=== Scoring tricks ===
Points are scored based on the tricks won in the hand. There are several ways to count up the points for play, but they always add up to 250 points. The last trick is always worth an additional 10 points added to any existing points in the actual trick cards. The classic counting system of pinochle is where aces are worth 11, tens are worth 10, kings are worth four, queens are worth three, jacks are worth two, and nines are worth zero. This method takes longer to count the score at the end of each hand.

A simpler method is to count aces and tens for 10 points, kings and queens for five points, and jacks and nines are worth zero.

An even simpler method has aces, tens, and kings worth 10 (and known as "counters"), and everything else zero ("garbage"). Since all points are multiples of ten in the third method, most players drop the redundant zero. Aces, tens, and kings won in tricks are worth one point. The meld scoring can also avoid the zero in the tenth place. Melds like 1,000 aces are thus worth 100. The terms "1,000 aces", "800 kings" and so on are often used, even though the point values are one-tenth.

	Method 1	Method 2	Method 3	Method 4
Aces	11	10	10	1
Tens	10	10	10	1
Kings	4	5	10	1
Queens	3	5	0	0
Jacks	2	0	0	0
Nines	0	0	0	0
Last trick	10	10	10	1

== Game variations ==
=== Two-handed ===
Two-handed pinochle is the original pinochle game, while partnership, auction, and all other variants are derived from it. It is the game most similar to the original Bezique game, whence pinochle was derived, via the German game of Binokel. The only significant difference in its rules from Bezique is the scoring.

The original version of pinochle involves a partial deal of twelve cards to both players in packets of four, leaving a stock of 24 cards. A player can score one meld after each trick won of the first 12 tricks. Melded cards can even be used to win tricks. After each trick, players draw one card from the stock into their hand starting with the trick-winning player. For the last 12 tricks, melds are taken into each player's hand and are no longer announced by the player who wins the trick. The traditional trick-taking rules apply only for these last 12 tricks.

In variations of two-handed play, no cards are initially dealt, a distinction from all other variations. Instead, the entire deck is placed face-down on the playing surface between the two players to form the widow. One player begins the hand-building process by drawing the top card of the widow. The player can either keep that card for her or his hand or reject the card.

If the player chooses to hold the initial card, the player then draws a second card from the widow, then places it face-down, without looking at it, creating a discard pile. If the player rejects the first card, the card becomes the first card in the discard pile. The second card drawn from the widow must be kept, regardless of whether the player preferred the first card. Players alternate turns in this hand-building process until all cards are chosen.

With bidding, the player winning the bid declares trump, then lays all meld face-up on the table. The other player shows her or his melds as well. Meld points are tallied, and players return meld cards to their hands. Some varieties accept a "round house", kings and queens of each suit, and earn a bonus 10 points awarding a total of 250 points.

Trick-taking commences and continues until all held cards have been played. One variation has no "leading" requirement for the bid winner or subsequent trick winner to lead a specific card, however the rules of "following" are still observed.

When adding counters, cards from each player's discard pile are included in totals for a total of 240 counters per round, plus one counter for winning the final trick. One variation to make it more difficult for the bid-winning player, the discard pile created by drawing cards is used by the non-bidding player to score towards tricks.

=== Three-handed ===
In Three-handed pinochle using a single deck, each player plays for him or herself. The dealer deals 15 cards to each player and three cards to the kitty—a separate pile in the middle.

All players review their cards and silently determine their bids. The player to the dealer's left initiates the bidding process. If the player has a meld, he or she is required to open the bidding; otherwise, they may pass or bid. If he or she passes, the obligation to bid passes to the next player, if meld is held. Once a player passes, he or she is out of the auction.

Bidding begins at 20, or as little as 19 if dealer, and increases in multiples of 1. The highest bidder wins the auction and turns up the three-card kitty for all to see. The three widow cards are placed in the bid winner's hand. The bid winner then declares trump and lays down meld. The other two players also lay meld face-up for count.

After the appropriate points have been tallied, the bid winner must set aside any three cards that have not been melded. This will reduce the bid winner's hand to 15 cards. For all three players, meld is now returned to each respective player's hand, and the round is played.

During the round, a player must take at least one trick to "save one's meld", even if the trick contains no points. Otherwise, no meld points will be counted for that player during that round.

After all tricks are taken, counters are tallied for each player. The three discards by the highest bidder count toward their counter score for the hand, so there is always a total of 25 points for the trick score among the three players. If the highest bidder fails to make their contract by adding meld points and trick points from the play, then their score is negative the amount of the bid for that hand. The meld count is cancelled.

- After viewing the kitty, the highest bidder may concede the hand and take a negative score for the amount of their bid; however, they still must name trump and the other two players score their meld. Conceding the hand does save the trick points opponents would score playing their hands, although opponents will not have an opportunity to lose their meld by failing to take a trick.

The game is won when one player reaches 100 points. It is possible for two or all three players to go over 100 on the same hand. There are three methods of resolving ties:

- Playing another hand
- The game is extended becomes a contest to 125 points. If two players exceed 125 points on the same hand, the contest lengthens to 150 points. This rule holds regardless of score fluctuations (players "going minus"—failing to reach their bid amounts—and falling below 100 points.
- If two players exceed 100 points on the same hand, then the high bidder for that round automatically is declared the winner. If two non-bidders exceed 100 points on the same hand, then either of the other methods apply.

=== Renege ===
Any time a player accidentally misplays during the play portion of the hand, it is called a renege. There are various forms of misplay:

- Playing out of suit
- Sloughing on a trick when holding trump
- Playing out of turn
- Failure to discard three cards prior to the play portion of the hand—this constitutes a renege if bidder has led to the first trick
- Purposely exposing any portion of your hand to another player (during the play portion of the game for all players and also during the meld portion of the hand for nonbidders with the exception of meld cards)
- Failure to kill (Not going over the played card when required to during the hand)
- Any other action that disrupts the harmony of the game
- After play begins, any discovered misdeal not caused by a card-fault in the deck constitutes a renege for the dealer and any player on the dealer's team.

If the bidder reneges, they automatically take a double set and the amount of the bid is subtracted from their score. The two opposing players get to count their meld points and the remainder of the hand is thrown in.

If either of the two nonbidders misplay, the bidder automatically makes their bid. The bidder gets to score the amount of their bid and meld, the player that misplayed loses all meld and takes a single set, and the third player scores only their meld.

If at any point during melding or play it is determined that a non-standard deck is being used, any player may declare a card-fault misdeal. This results in the nullification of the entire hand including all meld and points obtained.

=== Cutthroat ===
Similar to three-handed pinochle, cutthroat is a simple modification. The dealer deals the entire deck out (16 cards to each player), in packets of four. The player to the left of the dealer begins the bidding once meld has been silently determined by all players. Play continues normally in terms of scoring and trick taking.

The only way to win in cutthroat pinochle, is to "bid and out", or to have taken the bid and surpassed the predetermined winning score. It is then possible for multiple players to go over the winning score. If none has taken a bid and met the resulting contract, a win has not happened and play continues. It is also possible for a person to lose with the high score if they do not take a winning bid.

=== Four-handed ===
Four-handed pinochle, or "partnership pinochle" is played with two teams of two players each. Partners are seated opposite from each other. Each player is dealt 12 cards. The opening bid is typically 150, but can be a higher agreed upon value.

All four players may bid. Both the bidder and his partner have their score count towards making the contract. High bidder names trump. There typically is no kitty. With a kitty, the four cards are distributed, one to each player, by the bid winner.

Each hand must meld separately. As in the three-handed version, the first player is forced to bid when holding meld. Play is often to 1,000 but can increase to 1,500 during partnership.

=== Five-handed and larger ===
Games with five hands or more typically modify partnership pinochle in a variety of ways. They are generally played with 1 1/2 or doubled decks, with extra dix added or withheld to make an even deal. With an odd number of players, the bidder asks for a desired card in the trump suit, with the first matching player being partner for that hand. Everyone else plays against the team. In larger groups, one or more players can sit out each hand allowing the remaining players to follow the appropriate rules for the respective number of players.

=== Check ===
Check pinochle is a gambling variant of three-hand. It is the same as to 1,000, except that players keep track of "checks". If playing for $1 stakes, each check gained means that the other two players owe a dollar. The following events cause a gain or loss of checks.

- Flush or run +1 check
- Aces +1 check
- Roundtable +2 checks (marriage in each suit)

Note that checks for meld can be earned either by the bidder or non-bidder. Checks are kept even if the bid is not made.

- Looking at the "talon" and losing the hand (either by conceding or playing) −1 check
- Playing the hand and losing −1 additional check
- Not looking at the talon and conceding 300 points. – no gain or loss of checks (happens when forced to bid)
- Double marriage (two marriages in same suit) +1 check
- Double pinochle +1 check
- Double aces, double kings, double queens, or double jacks +2 checks
- Winning the game +5 or +10 checks
- 7 nines +5 or +10 checks (do not need to win the bid to get credit)

=== Double-deck ===
Today "double-deck" pinochle is a popular form of the game, exclusively played by the National Pinochle Association, the American Pinochle Association, the Cambridge Pinochle Association, and in the "World Series of Pinochle".

Double-deck pinochle is played with two pinochle decks, without the nines. This makes for an 80 card deck.

Play is similar to regular pinochle, except 20 cards are dealt to each person and minimum bid is increased to 500 points. In some variations, bids are made in increments of 10 or more points until 600 is reached, then by 50 points. This version often features "meld bidding", a bid made to let a partner know what is in the bidder's hand. The only communication during bidding should be a numerical number or "pass", any other way of communicating is called "talking across the table" and is forbidden.

There are occasionally different meld values for a run and a pinochle; a run being 250 or 150 points, and a pinochle being 150 or 40 points. All other aspects of the game generally remain the same.

==== Technical Misdeal ====
If a player is dealt 13 or more non-counters and no aces, the player may declare a technical misdeal. This must declared before he or she plays the first trick. A technical misdeal nullifies all points melded for all players. The hand is then re-dealt by the original dealer of that hand.

=== Triple-deck, six-handed ===
This version follows the rules of double-deck pinochle.

In triple-deck pinochle six play in two partnerships of three each; each player has an opponent at their right and left. Three pinochle decks with no nines are mixed together, making a pack of 120 cards. Each player is dealt 20 cards, and the rules of double deck pinochle apply, except that the minimum bid is 75, and the last trick is worth 3 points. most of the extra melds made possible by the triple pack do not count extra. i.e. if a player should hold twenty aces, five of each suit, the value would be that of double aces and triple aces combined.

=== Racehorse ===
Note that this use of the term "racehorse" is inconsistent with the commonly understood meaning of the term when applied to Pinochle. As summarized by Dave LeVasseur: "Racehorse means that, after the winning bidder has named trump, that player's partner passes cards across the table"

Played much the same as "double deck" but to six hands, the point values are inflated.

Two teams are formed, 20 cards are then dealt to each player and four cards are dealt to the blind. Bidding commences with the person immediately to the left of the dealer automatically bidding 500. The winner of the bid includes the blind into their hand, calls trump and melds.

	Around (1 of each suit)	Twice around	4 of a kind
Aces	100	1000	1000
Kings	80	800	800
Queens	60	600	600
10s or 9s	0	0	0

Note: all runs, double, triple, and quadruple, marriages must be in trump

	Not trump	Trump	Double	Triple	Quadruple
Marriage	20	40	300	900	the game
Pinochle	40	-	300	900	the game
Run	-	150	300	900	the game

The game continues with the standard rules of play. When the play is over each team adds up their points in the count with kings, 10s, and aces worth ten points, while queens and jacks are worth zero. If a team count plus meld does not equal their bid, they "go set". By going set the amount of the bid is subtracted from the team's score and their count is discarded. The other team retains both their meld and their count provided they took at least 10 points in the count.

=== Eight-player double-deck ===
Two full decks are dealt between eight players, forming four teams. Team members are spaced so that they are not able to see any other hands. The game is usually played to a score of 5,000 or higher. Other than this, the four-player rules apply, and any variations may also be used. There is an increased possibility that when one team declares trump another team may have an equal number of trump also, which may lead to an interesting game. An optional scoring rule rewards 1,000 points for a quadruple pinochle—four jacks of diamonds and four queens of spades in a meld.

=== Alternate end games ===
One variation on winning allows a team or individual to win instantly from any score by taking all the tricks in a hand. To win in this fashion, the winning player or team must play very skillfully to prevent opposing players from taking even one lowly (even zero-point) trick. This victory is known as "pinochling". A player or team can play for this victory even if they are not the highest bidder.

"Pinochling" does not require a bidder to make their bid. They also can play for this victory even if their bid cannot be made with the maximum number of trick points available plus their meld. The highest bidding player or team can prevent other players from attempting this if they elect to "throw in" the hand before the first card is played.

Another version of this, known as "shooting the moon," can be called out by the highest bidder before melding. In this variation, neither team lays their meld down, and the partner of the high bidder does not participate in trick taking. If the high bidder succeeds in taking every trick, they have successfully "shot the moon," and the game is over. If they do not successfully take every trick, this is known as a "miss," and the shooting team immediately loses the game. Another variation has a point value of 1,000 or 100 for shooting the moon, and an equal negative penalty for missing, and the game continues.

When playing "bid-out" rules, a team can win without bidding if their score reaches (and remains above) the agreed-upon game-ending score while their opponents fail to make their bid three times. This is known as a "slide-out". Not all versions require the opponents to fail to make their bid three times in order to cross the winning point threshold.

Some versions have an "out backwards" contingency, where if a team goes into the negative equivalent of what the game winning score is, they lose the game.

== See also ==
- Belote
- Bézique
- Binokel
- Marjolet

== General and cited references ==
- Mozin, Dominique Joseph (1820). Nouveau Dictionnaire de Poche Allemand-Français et Français-Allemand, Volume 2. Stuttgart/Tübingen: Cotta.
- Parlett, David (2008). The Penguin Book of Card Games. London: Penguin Books. ISBN 978-0-141-03787-5. OCLC 229463734.
- Pennycook, Andrew (1982). The Book of Card Games. London; New York; Sydney; Ontario; and Auckland: Granada. ISBN 0-583-12910-2.
