= Gaigel =

Card game

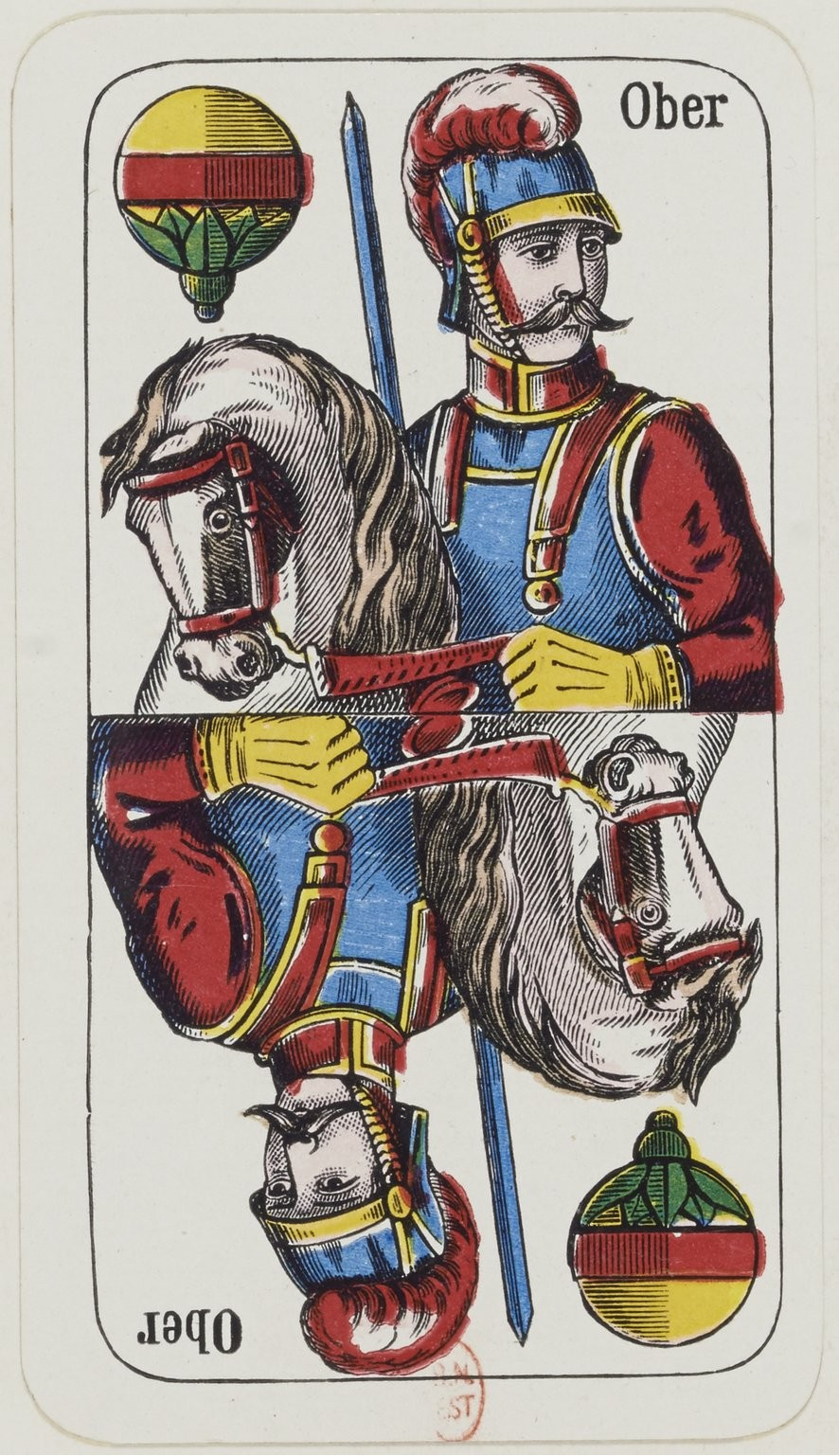
- Ober of Bells in a Württemberg pattern deck
- Origin: Württemberg
- Type: Point-trick
- Players: 2-4, 6
- Age range: 10+
- Cards: 2 x 24
- Deck: German (pattern)
- Play: Anticlockwise

Related games
- Sechsundsechzig • Schnapsen • Bauernschnapsen

Gaigel is a card game from the Württemberg region of Germany and is traditionally played with Württemberg suited cards. It is a Swabian variant of Sechsundsechzig and may be played with 2, 3, 4 or 6 players. However, a significant difference from Sechsundsechzig and other related games like Bauernschnapsen is the use of a double card deck. The four-player game is usually called Kreuzgaigel. The game emerged in the early 19th century.

== History ==
The game of Gaigeln is mentioned as early as 1844, along with Ramsen, Hopsen, (Note: Hopsen: Swabian name for the gambling game of Vingt un, also known as Rathen - see Schmid's Schwaebisches Woerterbuch.) Hundert und Eins, German Solo, Laubobern and Black Peter, as one of the usual card games played by the menfolk in Württemberg. Specific Gaigel cards were being sold in 1845 in an advertisement in the Kempten Zeitung. In 1846 it is described as a "new card game" that the author and language researcher, Raimund Jacob Wurst (1800–1845), had learned in Bad Ditzenbach in 1843. In 1883, Gaigel is recorded as being played by election officials at a polling station in Württemberg.

== Cards ==
Suits of the Württemberg deck
Bells (Bollen)	Hearts (Herz)	Leaves (Schippen)	Acorns (Eichel)
Suits of the French deck
Diamonds (Karo)	Hearts (Herz)	Spades (Pik)	Clubs (Kreuz)

For this game cards are used which in the trade are advertised as Gaigel/Binokel and contain a double set of 2×24 playing cards. The description of the suits varies regionally and is also dependent on whether Württemberg or French playing cards are used: in the local dialect they are typically called Eichel (Acorns), Schippen (Spades), Herz (Hearts) and Bollen (Bells).

=== Card precedence ===
Hierarchy of card values
Württemberg suit
Acorns	Leaves	Hearts	Bells
A 10 K O U 7	A 10 K O U 7	A 10 K O U 7	A 10 K O U 7
French suit
Clubs	Spades	Hearts	Diamonds
A 10 K D J 7	A 10 K D J 7	A 10 K D J 7	A 10 K D J 7

Within the four suits the precedence of cards is always the same: Deuce (Ace, Daus, Ass, Alte, Sau) → 10 → King → Ober (Queen) → Unter (Jack) → 7 Because there are 2 of each playing card, if both are played in one trick, then the player who led wins the trick. For example, if both Aces of Acorns are played, the trick goes to the player who went first (under the assumption that no-one has trumped).

=== Card value ===
The following values (card points) are assigned to the individual cards:

Württemberg deck		French deck		
Card value	Symbol	Card value	Symbol	Points
Deuce (Daus or Sau)	A (without)	Ace (Ass)	A	11
Ten (Zehner)	10	Ten (Zehner)	10	10
King (König)	K	King (König)	K	4
Ober	O	Queen (Dame)	Q	3
Unter	U	Jack (Bube)	J	2
Seven (Siebener, Nixer, Dissle)	7	Seven (Siebener)	7	0

== Aim ==
The aim of the game is to be the first player or team to score 101 card points or Augen.

== Dealing ==
The dealer offers the cut to the player on his left and then deals three cards to each player in anti-clockwise fashion (colloquially described as "rechtsherum haut man an die Backe"). The dealer then takes the next card, which is used to determine the trump suit, and places it face up in the centre of the table, before dealing two more cards to each player, so that everyone has a hand of five cards. The talon is then placed crosswise on top of the trump card in the middle of the table so that latter remains partly visible. Should forehand choose not to cut the deck (indicated by 'knocking' on it instead), then - by agreement - five cards may be dealt to each player in turn before the trump card is flipped.

== Playing ==
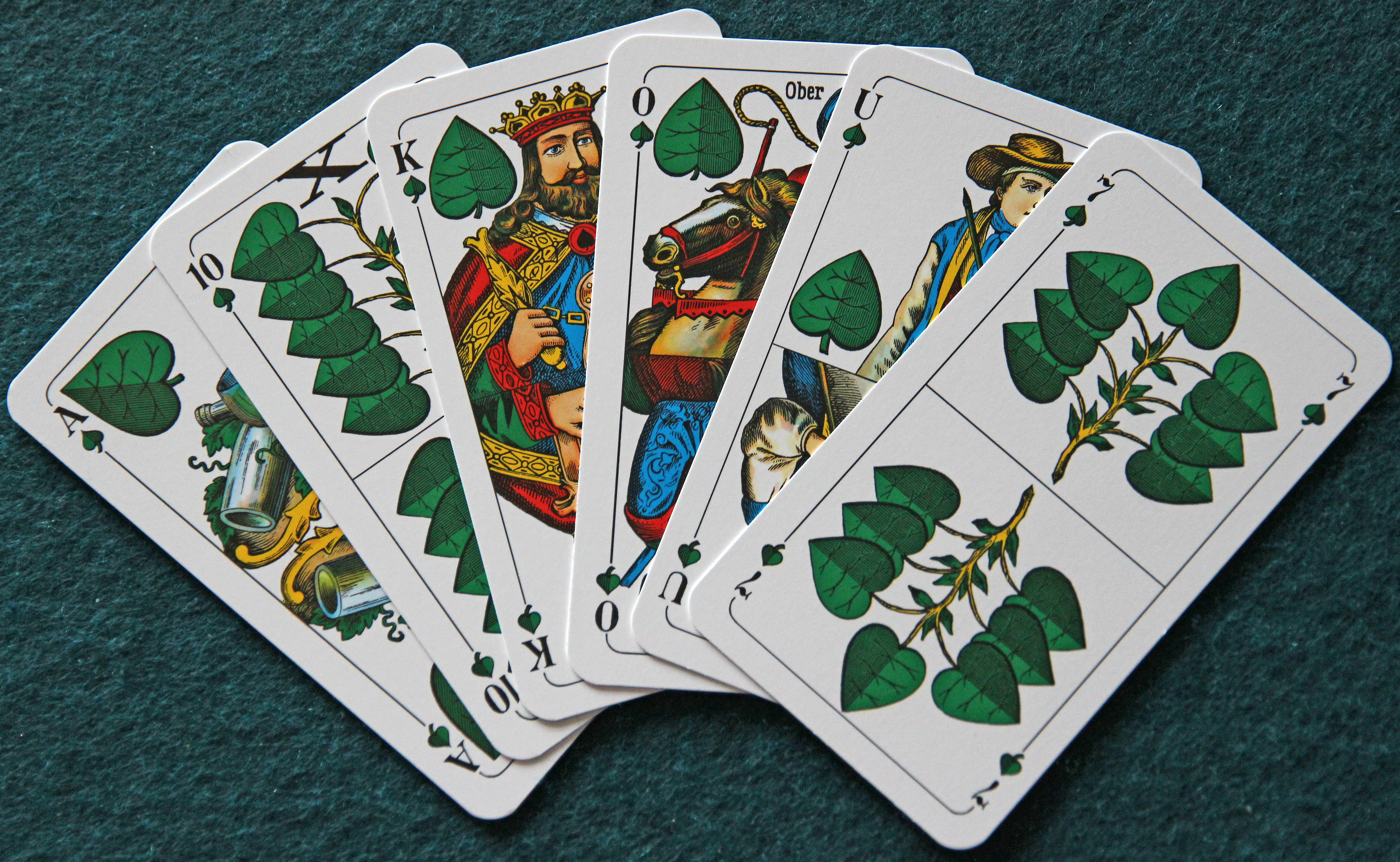
The suit of Leaves in a Gaigel/Binokel pack

=== Players and partnerships ===
- Games of two or three players are played singly; each player is on his own.
- In games with four or six players, it is usual to play über Kreuz ("crosswise"): the players sitting opposite one another form teams of two whose tricks are counted together; in doing so they may, optionally, winken i.e. pass information to one another by secret signs. Partnerships are determined by a process calle the Umschlag , where each of the four players in turn is dealt a card, face-up. This continues until the first two (or, for six players, the first three) aces are dealt. The two players (or three in a game of six) with these aces sit opposite one another in the following match and form a party. The other two represent the opposing party. Because of their seating arrangement, a game of four players is a so-called "Kreuzgaigel" ("Cross Gaigel"). In Kreuzgaigel, the playing partners remain the same during a games night.

=== Opening ===
The player to the right of the dealer is the forehand (Vorhand) or eldest hand and leads to the first trick.

In opening the play, forehand has to choose one of several options and announce it to the other player(s). For the first trick, the rule is that there is no trump suit or that trumps may not be played:

1. Andere Alte / Zweites Ass ("Other Old Man" / "Second Ace"): the forehand plays an ace (not from the trump suit) face down. When all the others have played their cards, also face down, the cards are turned over. If another player has played the same ace, that player wins the trick. Otherwise the trick belongs to the forehand.
2. Ge-Elfen: the forehand plays an ace face up, the others play a card of their choice. Forehand wins the trick in every case.
3. Höher hat or Tauchen ("Higher wins" or "Diving"): the forehand plays a card of his choice, except that it must not be an ace or a trump card, face down. The others do the same. As soon as everyone has played their cards face down, the forehand turns his card over and then all the others do the same with their cards. If one of the other players has a higher card of the same suit, they win the trick; otherwise the forehand wins it.
4. Auf Dissle: the forehand announces auf Dissle. That means forehand wins by succeeding in holding five 7s in the hand at any time during the game. As soon as forehand has to make a trick, the game is lost. Forehand has also lost if one of the opponents reaches the normal end of the game.

=== Playing with the talon ===
After the first round of tricks, the game continues using the talon. The player who won the last trick leads to the next (kommt heraus). Of five hand cards, any one may be discarded. The rest of the players follow in clockwise order without any compulsion to play a trump, follow suit or win the trick.

In determining who wins the trick: trumps beat plain suited cards; the higher card wins if cards are of the same suit; the playing going first wins if both cards are the same value and suit. The winner of the trick draws another card from the talon and the others follow in order. Thus all the players have a hand of five cards again.

=== Melding ===
Once a player (or his team in the partnership game) has won a trick, that player may meld at any time in the game i.e. announce a pair comprising a King and Ober/Queen of the same suit. A trump pair is worth 40 points, plain suit pairs are worth 20 points. To do this the player simply announces "Forty" or "Twenty". The matched pair is always presented and one of the two cards in the pair is played to the next trick.

A card already used in a meld may not be used a second time for by the same player. It follows that if a player wants to claim a pair of the same suit, all four cards of the two pairs must be shown at once. If the player has already played one (or both) card(s) of the first pair, a meld of the same suit may not be claimed again.

So that a meld is not forgotten, the player claiming it may slide one of his trick cards of the same suite with the face up under his trick card pile.

=== Robbing (Rauben) ===
The player who has (or draws) a 7 of trumps and is the first to turn it over can exchange it for the trump card under the talon, provided that he or she already has a trick. The Diß robbery is usually announced by putting the Diß under the trump card and thus acquiring the right to steal the trump card. Thus, the partner is offered the opportunity to rob, in case the partner should get the second Diß. However, if the second Diß falls in a trick, the trump may be robbed without regard to the player's partner. However, as soon as a Diß has been placed under the trump card, it is no longer possible for the opposing party to rob the trump card in the current game.

=== Game after talon is used up ===
As soon as the talon is exhausted, players must follow suit if possible and try to win the trick.

=== Five 7s ===
A player dealt five 7s straight away may reveal them and wins the hand. A player with only has four 7s after the deal who hopes to draw a fifth from the talon during the game, can announce "on sevens" (Auf Siebener). During the game, the four sevens are retained in hand and the fifth card discarded without taking a trick. If a fifth 7 is drawn from the talon before the opponent reaches 101, the player's team wins the game.

== End of the game ==
The aim of the game is to score 101 card points (Augen). As soon as this occurs, a player may call "out!" (Aus!). This is known as "going out" (Aussagen, lit. "saying 'out'"). If this is not possible due to the number of players and distribution of the tricks, then the winner is the player with the most points.

The end of the game must be announced immediately after the last trick; a player allowing another trick to be played has "over-gaigelled" (übergaigelt), loses the hand and receives a double (minus) score known as a Gigackel (see below).

If a player calls "out!" and, on counting up the points, there are fewer than 101 points, the player (or player's team) have "under-gaigelled" (untergaigelt) and are given a Gigackel.

A player who has not taken any tricks and has not played auf Dissle, also gets Gigackel.

Otherwise the loser of the game is the player who has scored the fewest points.

== Scoring ==
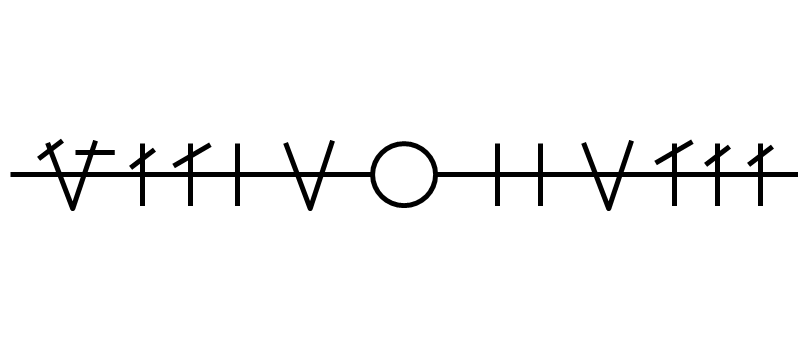
Example of scoring in Gaigel

The players must agree, in advance, on the number of games to be played. To record the results, two horizontal lines are drawn on a sheet of paper or slate, one for each player or team, radiating from a circle. If more than two players or teams play, additional lines are drawn from the circle either vertically or at an appropriate angle.

Each player or team thus has a line on which, if a game is lost, a small dash is marked at right angles to the line. For a double loss, a Gigackel is drawn on the line: a 'V' that represents two dashes.

When the agreed number of games has been played, players may move into the 'cleaning' phase (Putzen), when further games are played.

In each of these games, the winner is allowed to strike off a dash or one half of a Gigackel.

In the end, the winner is the player who is able to 'clean off' his or her marks first.

== Winken ==
For games with 4 or 6 players positioned über Kreuz a technique known as winken may be employed, whereby various signs and gestures are used to secretly communicate to one's playing partner which cards one has so that the partner can play an appropriate card. Examples are:

- Placing one's tongue in one's cheek: Bells
- Scratching the shoulder: Acorns
- Placing the hand briefly on the heart: Hearts
- Poking the tongue out briefly: Leaves
- Blinking: Ace/Deuce of trumps

== Variants ==
=== Gaigel zu dritt ===
By contrast with Kreuzgaigel with 4 or 6 players, in a game of 3 players no partnerships are formed. Each player plays for him/herself. Consequently, there is no winken at all. Otherwise the same rules apply as for Kreuzgaigel.

== Literature ==
- Griesinger, Carl Thedor (1844). "Carl Theodor Griesinger's saemmtliche bellestristische Schriften" in Skizzenbuch. Griesinger, Stuttgart.
- Claus D. Grupp: Doppelkopf – Schafkopf – Tarock. Original edition. Falken, Niedernhausen/Ts., 1997, ISBN 3-635-60223-X.
- Claus D. Grupp: Kartenspiele im Familien und Freundeskreis. Revised and newly printed edition. Originalausgabe. Falken, Niedernhausen/Ts., 1996/1997, ISBN 3-635-60061-X.
- Hugo Kastner, Gerald Kador Folkvord: Die große Humboldtenzyklopädie der Kartenspiele. Humboldt, Baden-Baden, 2005, ISBN 3-89994-058-X.
- Matthias Mala: Das grosse Buch der Kartenspiele. Falken, Niedernhausen/Ts., 1997, ISBN 3-8068-7333-X.
- Hoegg, Gebhardt Hil. (1846). Raimund Jacob Wurst: eine biographische Skizze. J.C. Maecken, Reutlingen.
- Pressler, Ellis E. (1895) Gaigle: Laws and Rules, How to Play the Game. Williamsport, Pa.: Keystone Lithograph Company.
