= Bezique =

19th-century French card game for two players

- (Bésigue)
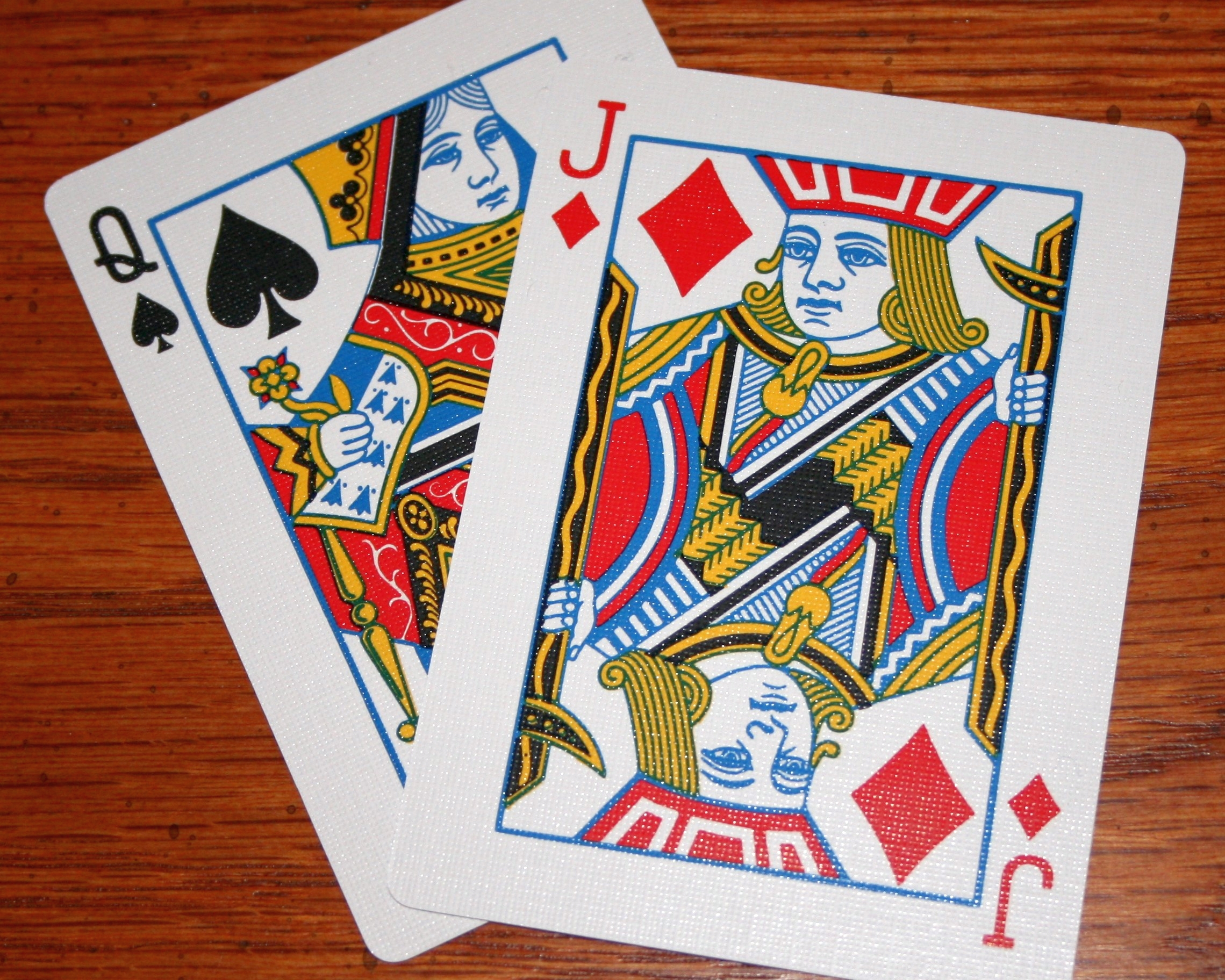
- Origin: France
- Type: Trick-taking
- Players: 2
- Cards: 64 (double 32-card pack)
- Deck: Piquet
- Rank (high→low): A 10 K Q J 9 8 7
- Playing time: 25 min.

Related games
- Binokel • Marjolet • Pinochle

Bezique (/bəˈziːk/) or bésigue (French: [beziɡ]) is a 19th-century French melding and trick-taking card game for two players, which was imported to Britain and is still played today. The game is derived from piquet, possibly via marriage (sixty-six) and briscan, with additional scoring features, notably the peculiar liaison of the Q♠ and J♦ that is also a feature of pinochle, Binokel, and similarly named games that vary by country.

== History ==
An early theory that appeared in the 1864 edition of The American Hoyle was that bezique originated in Sweden as the result of a royal competition. This much repeated, but unsubstantiated, tale is recounted thus:

The Royal Game of Bézique

This interesting game is supposed to have originated in Sweden. It is said that during the reign of the First Charles (presumed to mean Charles I of England who reigned from 1625 to 1649)--a reward having been offered by that monarch for the best game of cards, to combine certain requirements--a poor schoolmaster, by name Gustave Flaker, presented for the prize the game of cards which he called Flakernuhle, which was accepted by his royal master, and he made the recipient very happy with the promised purse of gold. The game became very popular in Sweden, and was finally introduced to Germany, changed in some respects, and called Penuchle. There it also acquired great popularity.

It is only a few years since it was first introduced in Paris, but it has also become a favourite game with all classes there. The French gave it the name Bézique.

What is known is that the first rules – for a game played with a single pack of 32 cards – appeared in Paris in 1847 where Méry described it as a new game. Another early theory was that bezique was developed in France from piquet and that the word "bezique", formerly bésique or bésigue, was known in France in the 17th century, coming probably from the Italian card game bazzica.

More recently, French historians traced the origins of bezique to a game called bezi or bezit, which descended through a form of single bezique also known as cinq cents or binage to early modern bezique. This appears to be corroborated by Anton (1879) who tells us that Besigue originally came from the regions of Angouleme, Poitou, and Saintonge on France's Atlantic coast where it was called besit.

The word bezique once meant "correspondence" or "association". In English-speaking nations, Binocles, meaning eyeglasses with this pronunciation, became the name for Bezique with minor rule variations, ultimately evolving into Pinochle. Two-handed Pinochle, two-handed bezique and two-handed binokel are almost identical. The main difference is that binokel is played with two packs of 24, German-suited, cards, instead of two packs of 32, French-suited, ones. Pinochle, together with six-pack bezique and Rubicon bezique, is still played in the United States.

In 1860, the game achieved its greatest popularity in Paris, and reached England in 1861. Perhaps the most famous proponent of the game was Winston Churchill, an avid player and early expert of six-pack, or "Chinese" bezique. There is some evidence that the English writers Wilkie Collins and Christina Rossetti were also enthusiasts. Since the late nineteenth century the game has declined in popularity.

The original 1847 game was played with a single piquet pack of 32 cards. The rules already suggested that the game might be played with two packs, which would double the number of available points. By no later than 1864 in the US, the standard two-hand game had evolved to use two or even three euchre packs, also of 32 cards.}

== Overview ==
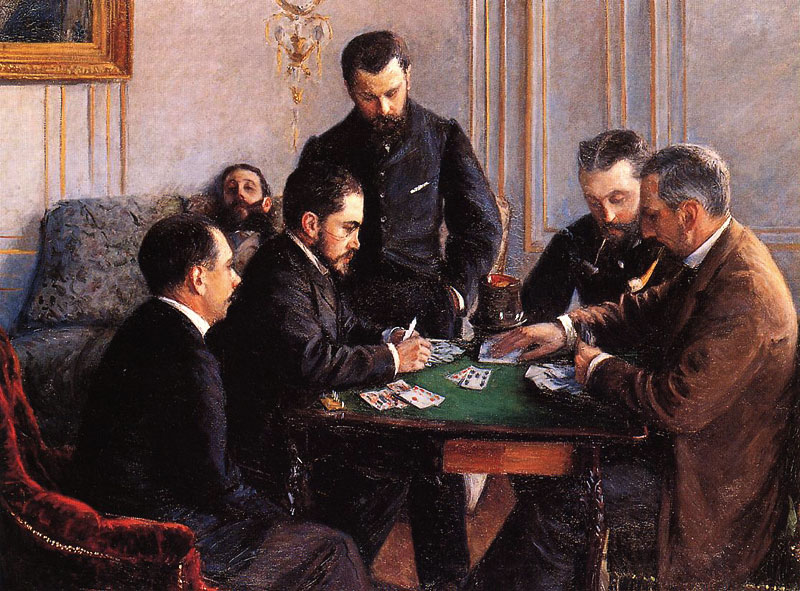
Gustave Caillebotte The Bezique Game (1881), Louvre Abu Dhabi

A two-handed bezique pack is a 64-card pack, consisting of the ace down to the seven of each suit doubled (i.e. the twos to sixes are stripped from two packs and the remaining cards combined). The players cut for deal, with the highest card having preference. The rank of the cards in cutting, and in play, is A, 10, K, Q, J, 9, 8 and 7.

Eight cards are dealt in batches of three, two and three, to each player. The next card is placed face up between the two players to establish the trump suit. The remaining cards, known as the "talon" or "stock", are placed face down beside it. Should the turn-up card be a 7, the dealer scores ten.

The non-dealer leads any card from hand and the dealer may then play any card. The normal requirement to follow suit if possible does not apply to bezique. If a second player chooses to play a higher card of the same suit or any trump, that player wins the trick. If the two cards of the same rank are played, the trick belongs to the first player.

Once played, tricks are placed face down by the player who wins each trick. The holder of the trump 7 is entitled to exchange it for the turn-up card at any time when on lead, scoring 10 points. The holder of the duplicate trump 7 also scores 10 when it is played.

The winner of each trick declares one meld face up on the table and scores points for it, takes a card from the top of the stock, and then leads to the next trick. The other player draws the second card from the stock, but may not declare a meld. The game proceeds until the stock is exhausted, at which point 8 more tricks are played to exhaust the players' hands. Finally, brisques are scored. The game is usually played as the first to 1,000 points.

=== Points for melds and brisques ===
7 of trumps turned up, played or declared	10
Winning last trick (before the final 8 tricks)	10
Common marriage (K and Q of any plain suit) declared together	20
Royal marriage (K and Q of the trump suit) declared together	40
Bezique (Q♠ and J♦) (Note: A variant of the rules says that a bezique may be Q♣ J♥ instead if either spades or diamonds is the trump suit.)	40
Double bezique (both Q♠ and both J♦)	500
Four jacks (Note: In some variants, four-of-a-kind melds must contain a card of the rank from each suit, e.g., K♠ K♥ K♣ K♦.)	40
Four queens	60
Four kings	80
Four aces	100
Sequence of five best cards of the trump suit (A 10 K Q J)	250
"Brisque" (each A or 10 won during the hand)	10

=== Further notes on scoring ===
In order to score for a meld, the cards comprising the given combination must all be in hand at the same time. Thus, cards played to previous tricks may not be included in melds. Cards already declared may be used for other melds of a different type, as long as the point score is greater. For example, four kings may be declared using a king previously declared for a marriage. A marriage can not be later declared, using a king previously declared in a meld of four kings, as the point score is less.

A card played to a trick is no longer available for game play. It is taken by the winner of the trick and placed face down on a separate pile. At the game's conclusion, each player counts the number of brisques (aces and tens) they have won in tricks. Each is worth ten points.

A player can declare a meld, only after winning a trick. The winner of each trick is entitled to score one meld, or several melds, depending on local rules, laying the cards forming it face upwards on the table. If the cards exposed show two combinations, both may be declared, but only one may be scored until another trick is won. Thus, having K♠ Q♠ J♦ scores 40 for bezique, with another 20 to score after the next trick is won.

Once a card has been melded, it cannot be used again in the same combination. It may be used for a different type of meld, that is, Q♥, once married, cannot be married to the other K♥, but it may be used as part of four queens and as part of a sequence if it is of the trump suit. A card which has been declared may not be declared again in a combination of an inferior order, i.e., if a king and queen have been declared as part of a sequence, they may not be used subsequently in a marriage, though the reverse is allowable.

The declared cards, left face upwards on the table, still form part of the hand, and are played to subsequent tricks at the discretion of the holder. When no more cards are left in the stock, the method of play alters. No further declarations may be made. The only additional score now possible is for brisques in the remaining tricks, scored by the winner of the trick.

The mode of play for these last eight tricks is according to normal whist rules, in that each player must now follow suit if possible, with the additional constraint that they must win the trick if possible, by playing a higher card or by ruffing.

== Step-by-step guide to the game (two-player version) ==
Bezique is not generally perceived to be a difficult game, though remembering the possible meld combinations and scoring can be confusing for the complete novice. There are also a number of small rules, such as the high ranking of cards with a face value of ten, the ability to swap sevens with the trump card and so on, that beginners should keep in mind.

Once the general pattern of playing a trick, declaring a meld (if any) and then drawing a new card from the talon is established in the mind, the player should then focus on tactics.

=== Preparing to play ===
Required are two packs of cards and a sheet of paper and pen to collate scores. Special bezique markers were made at the height of the game's popularity, but these are mostly rare now.

- Take the packs of cards and remove all cards with a value below seven, along with the jokers or wildcards. Remaining should be the cards with the numerical values of seven through to ten, the face cards and the aces.
- Shuffle the two packs together.
- A cut is made. The player with the highest valued card is given the privilege of dealing.
- In both the cut and the game player, the value of the cards from highest to lowest is as follows:
  - A, 10, K, Q, J, 9, 8, 7

=== The deal ===
The dealing sequence is as follows:

Deal three cards to the opponent, three cards to the self, two cards to the opponent, two cards to the self, three cards to the opponent once more and finally, three more cards to the self. In other words, it is in a pattern of 3, 2, 3.

The remaining cards are placed in a stack or talon in the middle of the table. The top card from the talon is turned over and placed face up alongside the talon. This card designates what the trump suit will be. If the dealer turns over the seven as the trump card, ten points are awarded. This card is available to be swapped by any player who wins a trick and holds the 7 of trumps (which replaces it as the face up card). The face up card (whether it is the original or a 7 of trumps) is the last to be taken (by the loser of the trick just played) at the end of the first phase of play.

In a variation of the game, if a player finds no face card in his hand (A, 10, K, Q or J), a "carte blanche" may be declared which receives 50 points from the opponent. All cards must be shown to the opponent to claim these points. This is not a standard rule of two-player bezique but is allowed in some regions.

=== The play (phase one) ===
The non-dealer may lead any card. This card is placed face upwards on the table. The dealer must respond by playing a card. If it is a card of the same suit but has a higher value or any card of the trump suit and the leading card is not of the trump suit, it wins the trick. If it is a lower or equal card of the same suit or a card of any other suit bar the trump suit, it loses.

Whoever wins the trick takes the cards and places them in a separate pile. These cards play no further part in the round. They are only used for scoring brisques

Note that there is no obligation to follow suit or to trump in this part of the game.

The only time a player would have a strong motivation to win the trick is when there are aces or tens being played or the player has a meld they wish to declare.

The winner of the trick has an opportunity to present a meld by declaring his combination and placing them face upwards on the table. They are still part of his hand but must remain on the table in view of the opponent until played in later tricks.

Only one meld can be declared per trick won. Scores for these are written immediately. The list of melds and their scores are listed in the table above.

Note that a card used in one meld cannot be played in the same meld later on. For example, K♣ married to Q♣ cannot later be married to the second Q♣. However, it can be used for a sequence of four kings as this is a different meld. Were both the other king and queen of clubs to be presented, the first king and queen could be part of the marriage.

A special meld declaration involves the seven of trumps. It is not placed on the table with the others. Instead, it can be swapped for the upturned trump card. The second seven of trumps can also be declared in this way.

The winner of the trick draws from the talon once they have declared their meld. The loser then also draws a card from the talon, thus maintaining eight cards in their hand at all times at this stage of the game. If no melds are declared by the winner of the trick, the cards are drawn immediately.

Whoever wins the trick then leads first in playing the next trick.

=== The play (phase two) ===
Once the talon is exhausted, the game play changes somewhat in nature.

The winner of the final trick draws the last card from the talon, whilst the loser takes the upturned trump card. The final eight tricks are played in this way:

- From now on, the player must follow suit and play a higher card than the leader if they can. If they cannot follow suit, they must trump to win the trick. If they cannot follow suit or trump, they can only then play any other card.
- Melds cannot be declared in this part of the game.
- The winner of the final trick is granted ten bonus points.

=== Counting the brisques ===
After the last trick is played, each player gathers the cards they have won and counts the number of aces and tens. Each of these is worth ten points. This number is added to the total score already earned from the various melds the player has declared.

Traditionally, the first player to reach 1,000 points wins, which normally involves an average of three to four rounds being played. However, a different target figure may be agreed upon before play begins, such as the first person to reach 2,000 points.

=== Penalties ===
- A player holding more than eight cards awards 100 points to their opponent.
- A player not drawing a card after a trick in phase one awards 10 points to their opponent.
- A player not winning a trick or following suit where it was possible in phase two concedes all remaining brisques to their opponent.

== See also ==
- Belote
- Binokel
- Pinochle
- Marjolet

== Literature ==
- Anton, Friedrich (1879). Encyclopädie der Spiele (3rd ed.). Leipzig: Wigand.
- Méry, Joseph (1847). L'Arbitre des Jeux. Paris: de Gonet.
- Parlett, David (2008). The Penguin Book of Card Games. London: Penguin. ISBN 978-0-141-03787-5.
- "Trumps" (1864). The American Hoyle, New York: Dick & Fitzgerald
- Brownsmith, Telemachus [pseud.] (1869). "Bézique" in The Westminster Chess Club Papers. Vols. 1–3. London: W. Kent; Edinburgh: J. Menzies; Dublin: McGlashan. pp. 117–119.
