= Kontra (cards) =

Card game term

Kontra or Contra is a term used in certain card games of Central European origin that is called by players to raise the stakes. It is the equivalent of "double" in other games. The term comes from the Latin word, contra, which means "against". In German there is also a verb, kontrieren, which means "to double" or "to announce 'Kontra'".

== Use in card games ==
=== Tarock ===
If a player is given the right to bid in Tarock games, an opponent may announce Kontra if he thinks the soloist is unlikely to win. This doubles the value of the game. (Note: See for example Hungarian Tarokk at pagat.com.)

If the soloist believes that he can still win the game, he may reply with Rekontra (or Re for short), which doubles the game value again.

In Tarock, a further doubling is allowed by saying Subkontra (or Sub for short) or, occasionally Hirsch ("stag"), a joking reference to the German word, Re(h), which means "doe", and results in the original game value increasing by a factor of 8.

=== Skat ===
Announcing Kontra in Skat and Rekontra is very common, but is not part of the official rules. Players often say Supra instead of Subkontra.

In many game rounds the stakes may be doubled again and the game value upped sixteenfold, but this is rather rare in practice. These announcements vary widely, for example, in some circles the announcement Hirsch follows Bock which is used to mean "Supra".

=== Doppelkopf ===
In Doppelkopf the side that has the Queen of Clubs announces a "double" with Re, while their opponents say Kontra. This makes it clear which side is bidding.

=== Schafkopf ===
In Schafkopf, regional terms such as Spritz or Stoß are used to double the game as well as Contra (spelt that way). In response, the declarer or declaring team may say Re or Zurück to redouble. Further doubling of the stakes may be announced as follows:

- Supra, Sup, nochmal drauf (x 8)
- Resupra, Resup, nochmal zurück (x 16)
- Bock (x 32)
- Hirsch (x 64)

Doubling is known as spritzen and redoubling as zurückspritzen.

=== Klabberjass ===
Klabberjass is always played with Kontra and Re. These must be announced before play to the first trick. Players may agree that Schenken is allowed whereby an opponent of the trump maker may offer to concede the game after the auction is over. The player's partner may, however, refuse.

=== Watten ===
In Watten, the term Kontra is not used, but a similar practice is very common. It is known as ausschaffen. So the announcements, "you going?" ("geht ihr?") or "three" ("drei") raise the game value from the normal two points to three points. Other increments such as "four" or "five" may be announced alternately (until the number of points need for a win is reached, i.e. in the first game at a theoretical 15). However, the game value is not doubled each time.

== Kontraschnapser ==
In the card game of Bauernschnapsen there are special contracts of Kontraschnapser and Kontrabauer. Unlike other card games, Kontra in this case means that the opponents of the side that chose the trumps, want to announce a contract with this trump suit.

== Bibliography ==
- Peschel, Walter (1990). Bayerisch Schaffkopfen. 2nd edn. Weilheim: Stöppel
