= Chouine =

French card game

- Historical game popular in the Loire valley
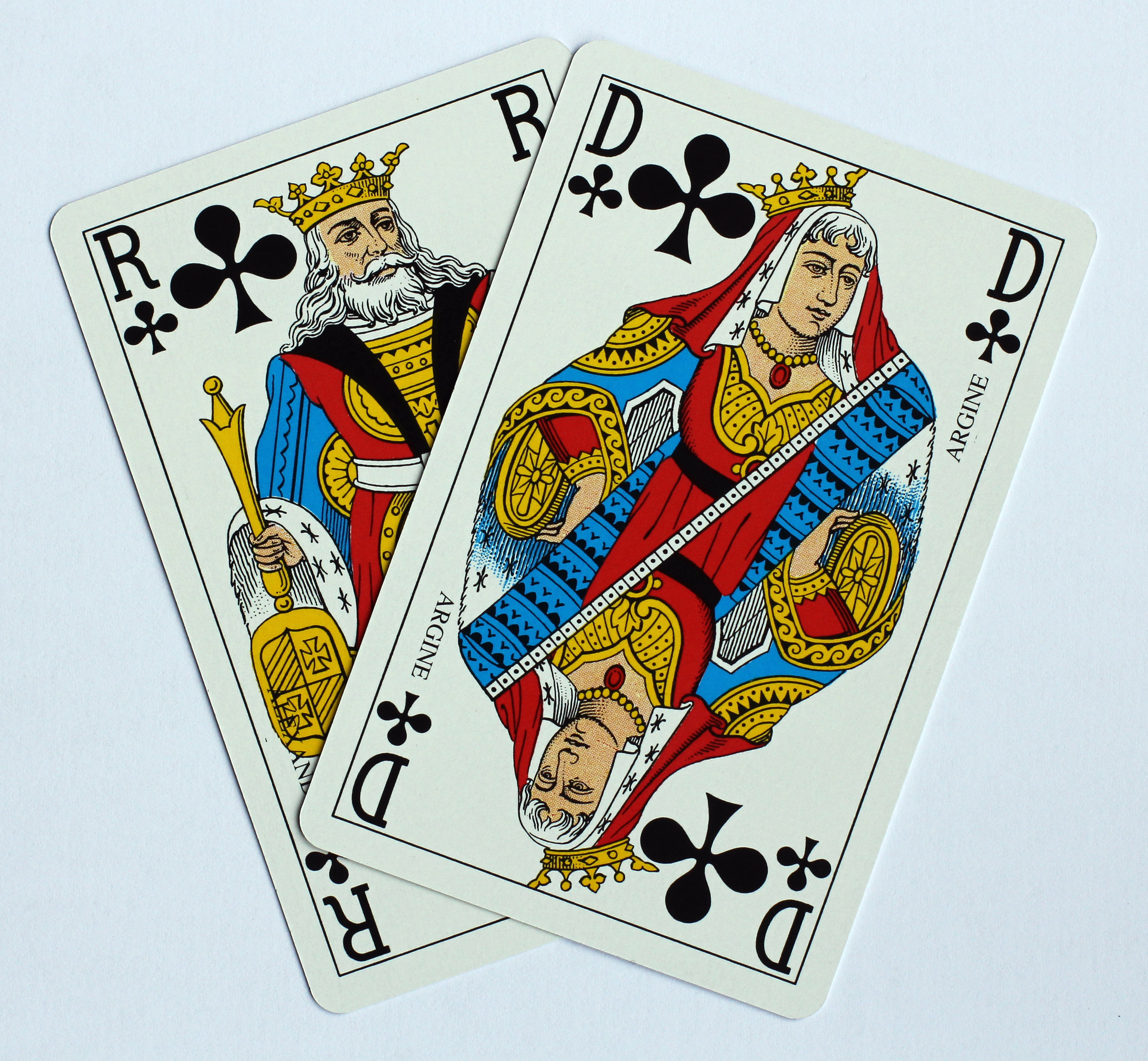
- A mariage of the King and Queen of Clubs
- Origin: France
- Type: Trick-taking
- Players: 2
- Cards: 32
- Deck: Piquet pack
- Rank (high→low): A 10 K Q J 9 8 7
- Play: Alternate

Related games
- Brisque

Chouine is a very old French card game of the ace–ten family for two players that is still played today in the Loire Valley, especially in north Touraine. It is a point-trick game that uses a piquet pack of 32 cards. It appears to be a variant of Brisque or Briscan. The game has regained local popularity in recent decades. John McLeod assesses chouine as a good entry point for games of the Mariage family, thanks to its relatively relaxed rules.

== History ==
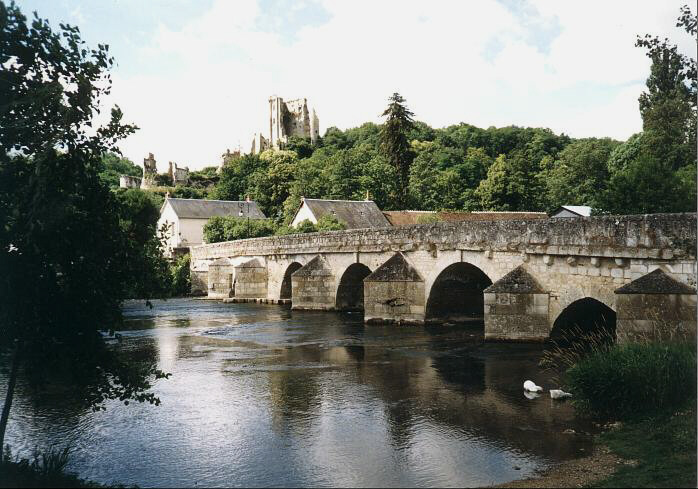
The 14th-century bridge and 15th-18th-century château at Lavardin, home of chouine

Chouine is a card game played in the Loire Valley whose origins go back at least to the 18th century in the Kingdom of France. It is thought to be related to Briscan which in turn is a cousin of Mariage, a game first attested in 1715. (Note: Although chouine sources suggest that its origins go back to the 16th century because the game of Mariage was mentioned by Rabelais in Gargantua in 1534, David Parlett points out that "nothing is known" of that game and other evidence suggests it could refer to a relative of Piquet.) An 1849 dictionary of the Normandy dialect gives chouine as a "term in the game of Briske (sic) which indicates that one has in hand the Ace, King, Queen, Jack and Ten of trumps."

In Émile Zola's 1887 novel, La Terre, he recounts two men playing a rowdy game of "La Chouine" at Cloyes in the Loire Valley.

The game has had a renaissance in recent decades and 'world championships' have been held annually since 1974 in the village of Lavardin, Loir-et-Cher, the "capital of Chouine". These are preceded by courses for beginners, especially young people.

== Rules ==
The following rules are based on Proust, supplemented by other sources where indicated:

=== Overview ===
The game is usually played by two players for the best of three rounds (manches) each of three or five hands (parties or points (Note: A point is the local name for a partie which in English is a hand or deal.)). The aim is to collect as many card points as possible and to score bonus points through declarations and taking the last trick.

=== Cards ===
The cards rank as at Belote: A > 10 > K > Q > J > 9 > 8 > 7. For scoring purposes, the cards have the following card points: A 11, Ten 10, K 4, Q 3 and J 2; the remainder have no point value. The Aces and 10s are known as brisques. (Note: In a local variation, only the brisques are counted; if they are equal to within plus or minus 10 points, they and the court cards are scored following the same scheme.)

=== Deal ===
The first dealer is the one who draws the lowest card from the spread pack. The dealer shuffles and has the pack cut before dealing each player 5 cards, singly and face down, beginning with the non-dealer. After dealing, the dealer places the remaining cards face down and to one side as the talon and then turns the top card for trump, placing it half under the talon and at right angles to it, face up. The deal alternates within each round. The role of first dealer alternates from round to round.

In friendly games that are not part of a tournament, the cards may be dealt in two packets of 2 and then 3 cards.

=== Declarations ===
During play, players may declare any of the following combinations when playing a card to a trick, even after the talon is used up. The combination must be shown before the lead to the next trick to count and one card of the declaration must be played to the current trick. Declarations are worth bonus points as shown. The player declares by saying e.g. "I have a 30 in Spades."

- Mariage (K + Q in suit) – 20 pts
- Tierce (K + Q + J in suit) – 30 pts
- Quarteron (K + Q + J + A in suit) – 40 pts (Note: Also called quarante, "forty".)
- Quinte (five brisques) – 50 pts (Note: Also called cinquante, "fifty".)
- Chouine (A + 10 + K + Q + J in suit) – wins the hand without further play.

The first three declarations listed above are worth double if in the trump suit. If both players have a chouine at the same time, either as a result of the deal or picking up from the talon, then a trump chouine beats a side suit one. If neither has a trump chouine, the player on lead wins.

Players may hold onto a combination in the hope of being able to add to it with cards from the talon, e.g. if Annette has 4 brisques, she may wait in the hope of drawing a fifth brisque from the talon in order to declare a 50. They may not make the same declaration twice, e.g. if a Quinte is declared and another brisque picked up, it cannot be declared a second time. An Ace used in a Quarteron may be subsequently used in a Quinte and vice versa.

=== Play ===
There are two phases. Phase 1 lasts as long as there are cards in the talon. Players may play any card and each draw a fresh card after each trick. Phase 2 begins as soon as the talon is exhausted. Players must now follow suit if able, otherwise must play a trump. If a trump is led, it must be overtrumped if possible. The trick is won by the higher (or only) trump or by the higher card of the led suit if no trumps were played. While the talon exists, the trick winner draws a fresh card from the talon, followed by the opponent. The trick winner leads to the next trick.

A player holding the trump 7 may exchange it with the trump upcard at any time. For tactical reasons, a player may delay doing this until the penultimate trick, after when it is obvious anyway who has the trump 7. At this point, when there are two talon cards left including the original upcard, the opponent of the player with trump 7, if about to lead to the 11th trick, normally says "au sept", out of courtesy, to remind the holder of the 7 to make the exchange.

The player making the last trick wins the "Dix-de-Der" which earns 10 bonus points. (Note: Dix de der is short for dix de dernière i.e. "Ten for Last".)

=== Scoring and winning ===
Players must pre-agree whether to play for one round or the best of three rounds (manches), a third and deciding round being called the Belle. Each round may comprise three or five hands (parties or points).

At the end of each hand, players tot up the points from tricks and declarations. The player who took the last trick scores a bonus of 10 points. The one with the most points wins the hand. If the players tie, neither wins and the same dealer re-deals. (Note: Proust only mentions the case where each player scores 65.)

Often, players just add up the brisques taken and the dix de der to determine the winner; only if they are close, are points counted.

== Three- and four-hand chouine ==
All is as in the two-hand game except that a) the dealer deals 3 cards each and turns the next card for trump, and b) there are only three declarations as follows:

- Mariage – as before.
- Trente – three brisques in one hand - worth 30 points
- Chouine – K + Q + J in the same suit which wins the hand.

There are no teams; the player with the most points wins the hand.

Three- and four-hand chouine are played over a single round of three or five hands. In three-hand chouine, the last two cards of the talon, including the turnup replaced by the trump 7 are not drawn.

== Chouine de Mondoubleau ==
This variant is mostly played in the Perche Vendôme region. All is as in the description of the two-hand game above except that a) declarations may only be made when on lead and b) there is no trump turnup; instead, trumps are determined by the first Mariage declared in a three- or four-hand game, or first Mariage, Tierce or Quarteron in a two-hand game. As usual, combinations do not have to be declared; if none is, the game proceeds at no trump.

== Bibliography ==
- Daynes, Daniel (1996). Le Livre de la Belote, Paris: Bornemann. Chouine described on pp. 16 – 17.
- Duméril, Édélestand and Alfred Émile Sébastien Duméril (1849), Dictionnaire due Patois Normand, Caen: Mancel.
- Parlett, David (1990). The Oxford Guide to Card Games. Oxford/NY: OUP.
- Zola, Émile (1887). La Terre, tr. by George D. Cox. Philadelphia: Peterson.
