= Brusquembille =

French card game

- 18th-century French game
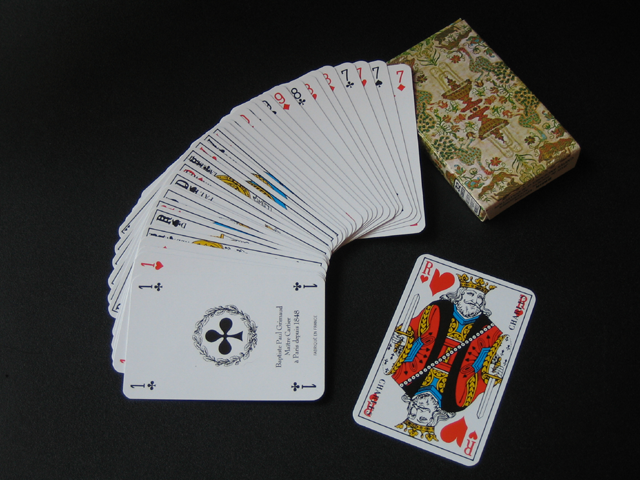
- French Piquet deck
- Origin: France
- Type: Point-trick game, trick-and-draw type
- Players: 2-5
- Cards: 32
- Deck: Piquet pack
- Rank (high→low): A 10 K Q J 9 8 7

Related games
- Briscan, Brisque

Brusquembille or Briscambille is a historical, French, 3-card trick-and-draw game for two to five players using a 32-card piquet pack. The game has variable trumps. Side-payments are made for keeping or winning aces and tens.

The Brusquembille rules published in 1718 are the earliest surviving French rules of an ace–ten card game. (Note: Rules for the Ace-Ten game of Mariage are known as early as 1715.) Cards have precisely the same card-point values as in a number of modern games such as Skat.

== History ==
According to David Parlett, Brusquembille was first described in the 1718 edition of Académie Universelle des Jeux. Taking the first description and the 1721 Dutch reprint at face value, tens ranked between jacks and nines in terms of trick-taking power. The 1730 edition already puts them between aces and kings. The descriptions of the game generally ended with a paragraph that remarked on the unclear etymology of its name. It may be related in some way to the comedian Jean Gracieux (died 1634 in Paris), whose stage name was Bruscambille.

Briscola, a close relative of Brusquembille without the side-payments and played with a full Italian pack, is still very popular in the south of Europe. But the family of ace–ten card games, of which Brusquembille is the earliest known representative, has gradually adopted numerous innovations such as "marriages" between king and queen of trumps, jacks and or queens as fixed trumps, widows, and various bidding and auction mechanisms. These have turned it into a multifaceted family, containing highly successful games such as Skat, Pinochle, Sixty-six, Klaberjass and Belote.

== Basic game mechanism ==
Ranks and point-values of cards
Rank	A	10	K	Q	J	9	8	7
Value	11	10	4	3	2	–		

When three or five play, two sevens are removed to make the number of cards divisible by the number of players. When four play, they can form two partnerships. Partners sit on the same side so that they can consult each other's hand. Each player is dealt 3 cards. The first card from the remaining stock is put face-up and crosswise under the stock. It determines the trump suit and will be the last card drawn during the game.

Eldest hand leads to the first trick. Players need not follow suit, but may play any card. The trick is won by the player who played the highest trump, or if no trump was played by the player who played the highest card of the suit led. So long as the stock is not empty, the winner of the trick takes a card from the stock to fill up their hand, and the other players do the same. In any case the winner of a trick leads to the next trick.

When trick-play is over, players count the card-points in the tricks they have won. The player who has the most card-points wins the deal.

== Scoring and side payments ==
Before the deal each player pays an agreed number of chips into the pot. The winner of the deal receives the pot.

The aces and tens are called the brusquembilles. Apart from making up more than 2/3 of the card-points between them, they also give rise to side-payments. A player who wins a trick with an ace receives two chips from every opponent, and a player who played an ace but lost it pays two chips to every opponent. The same principle applies for tens, but only with a single chip. For a partnership game the rule is adapted in a meaningful way.

== Later additions to the rules ==
- The winner of the first trick has the right to exchange a trump from their hand with the turned-up card.
- In the last three tricks players have to follow suit.
- A trick without any card-points is still worth one point.

== See also ==
- Briscan (Brisque)

== Literature ==
- Académie Universelle des Jeux, Legras, Paris 1718, p. 127–131.
- Plus Nouvelle Académie Universelle des Jeux, Leiden 1721, p. 127–130.
- Académie Universelle des Jeux, Legras, Paris 1725, p. 145–152.
- Parlett, David (1990), The Oxford guide to card games: a historical survey, Oxford University Press, ISBN 978-0-19-214165-1
- Parlett, David (1991). A History of Card Games. Oxford, England: Oxford University Press. ISBN 0-19-282905-X.
