= Little Lots =

Patience game

- A patience game
- Origin: France
- Deck: Single 32-card Piquet pack
- Playing time: 1 minute
- Chance: High
- Odds of winning: 1 in 6

Little Lots is a patience game and one of the most popular and widespread card games in the world.

== History ==
Little Lots probably originated in France where it is recorded as early as 1857 as Les petits Paquets, some years before Edna Cheney records its first appearance in the English language in 1869.

== Cards ==
A 32-card Piquet or Skat pack is used; alternatively remove the Sixes and below from a standard 52-card pack.

== Rules ==
The following rules are based on those for Die Acht-Päckchen-Patience ("The Eight Packet Patience") at the Alle Karten Spiele website. The pack is dealt to eight piles, each of four cards. The bottom three cards are face down, the top one is turned face up.

The aim of the game is to remove all eight packets of cards to a wastepile by following the rules. Two cards of the same rank may always be removed. For example, if there are two Kings among the eight upcards, they are removed to the wastepile and two cards under them are turned over.

A lower (face down) card may not be looked at until the upcard above it has been removed, with one exception. If three of the upcards are of the same rank, e.g. three Obers, the three cards below them may be viewed to decide which two of these three Kings to remove from the game. (Note: Little Lots, as described by Morehead and Mott-Smith, does not have this exception.)

The patience is out when all eight packets have been removed from the game. However, the game is lost if there are no visible pairs at any stage. Since the outcome depends a lot on chance, Little Lots is one of the harder patiences to get out.

== Literature ==
- Cheney, Ednah D. (1869). Patience a series of games with cards. Boston: Lee & Shephard. OCLC 609163778.
- Durheim, Carl Jakob (1857). Recueil de quatre-vingts patiences avec des figures lithographiées (in French). Berne: Impr. Haller. OCLC 1333362894.
- Morehead, Albert H.; Mott-Smith, Geoffrey (2001). The complete book of solitaire and patience. Slough: Foulsham. OCLC 1357504346.
