= Hope Deferred =

Card game

- A patience game
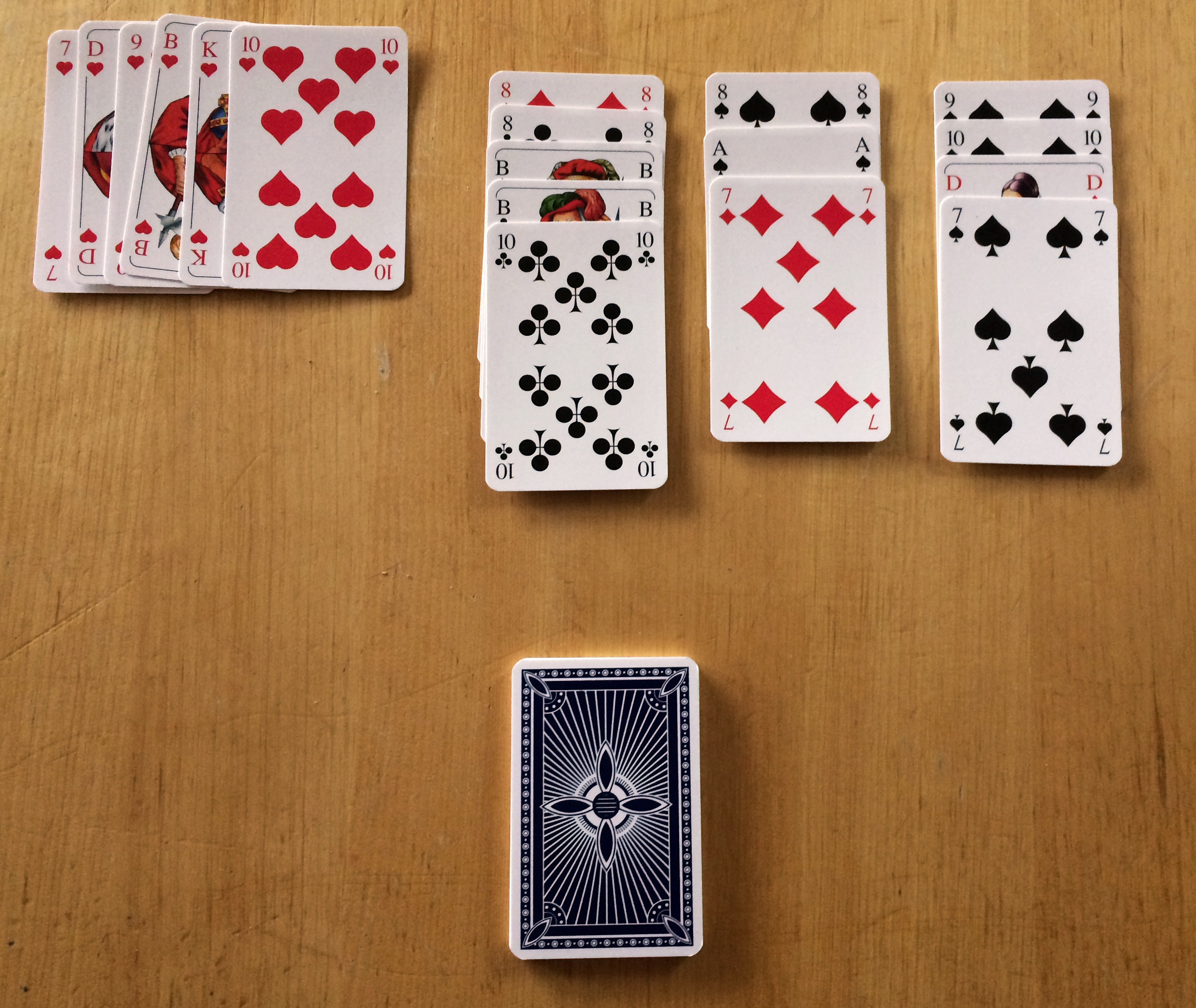
- Herz zu Herz, layout after the 3rd round. The patience is not complete because not all the Hearts have been laid off
- Origin: England
- Alternative names: Hope, Knockout
- Named variants: Herz zu Herz, Abandon Hope
- Type: Non-builder
- Deck: Single 32-card Piquet pack
- Playing time: 3 minutes
- Chance: High
- Odds of winning: 1 in 3

Hope Deferred is a simple game of patience, played with a French-suited Piquet pack of 32 cards. The aim of the game is to get rid of all the Clubs from the pack.

== History ==
The game is first recorded by Professor Hoffmann in 1892 as Hope. In this earliest version, the player chooses the suit to eliminate, but Clubs is given as the example. In all later versions, Clubs is automatically the discard suit and the game is variously called Knockout or Hope Deferred. The game does not surface very frequently in the literature.

== Rules ==
=== Hope ===
The following are the original Hoffmann rules: The game is played with 32 cards ranking from 7 to Ace in each suit. The player chooses a suit, say Clubs, shuffles the pack and deals 3 cards to the table in a row, setting aside any Clubs. Another 3 cards are dealt and the procedure repeated. This is done five times, i.e. 15 cards are dealt in toto. The cards are then reshuffled (except for the discards) and another five packets of three are dealt in succession, any Clubs being removed each time. Finally the cards are shuffled for the third time and packets of three dealt out. If at the end of this third pass, all the Clubs are out, the patience has succeeded; if any Clubs are left in hand, it has failed.

=== Hope Deferred ===
In Hope Deferred, a.k.a. Knockout, the target suit is always Clubs and when a space is created in the row, it is filled. Thus, possibly more than 15 cards are dealt per round.

== Variants ==
=== Abandon Hope ===
There is an expanded version called Abandon Hope where all 52 French-suited playing cards are used and 24 (or more) are dealt in each of the three rounds.

=== Herz zu Herz ===
In Germany a variant called Herz zu Herz ("Heart to Heart") is played with a French-suited Skat pack. The aim of the game is to get rid of all the Hearts from the pack.

At the start of the game, the pack is shuffled and placed as a stock face down on the table. Next, the top three cards are drawn and placed in a row, face up. Any cards of the suit of Hearts are laid off to form a separate stack and this process is repeated four times with three cards each time. After that the rest of the cards in the talon are shuffled with the upcards and three cards are drawn again and the Hearts laid off. This is repeated five times. If this round does not result in all the Hearts being laid off to the Hearts pile, there is a third round of shuffling, drawing three cards and laying off any Heart.

The patience is solved if, after this third round, all the Hearts are in their own pile, otherwise, the game is lost.

== See also ==
- List of patiences and solitaires
- Glossary of patience and solitaire terms

== Literature ==
- Dick, Harris B. (1898). Dick's Games of Patience; or, Solitaire with Cards. 2nd Series. 113 pp. 70 games. NY: Dick & Fitzgerald.
- Professor Hoffmann [Angelo Lewis] (1892). The Illustrated Book of Patience Games. London: Routledge.
- Morehead, Albert H. and Geoffrey Mott-Smith (1950). Complete Book of Patience.
- Moyse, Alphonse Jr. (1950). 150 Ways to Play Solitaire. Cincinnati: USPCC. 128 pp.
- Parlett, David (1979). The Penguin Book of Patience, London: Penguin. ISBN 0-7139-1193-X
- Wolter-Rosendorf, Irmgard (1994). Patiencen in Wort und Bild. Falken-Verlag, p. 11. ISBN 3-8068-2003-1.
- Höfer, Katrin (2010). Patiencen: Für Anfänger und Fortgeschrittene. Neue Beispiele und Varianten. Aufgaben und Lösungen. Schlütersche, 2010; pp. 89–90. ISBN 3-8068-2003-1. (Google Books)
