= Bruscambille =

Jean Gracieux (1575–1634), known as (Nicolas) Deslauriers in comedy and Bruscambille in farce, was a comedian at the Hôtel de Bourgogne theatre in Paris during the early 17th century. He may have given his name to the historical French card game of Brusquembille whose rules are known from the early 18th century.

== Life ==
Gracieux was born in 1575 in Champagne and died in 1634. He began in farce at the beginning of the 17th century and was renowned for his salacious prologues full of inimitable amphigouri.

In his facetious prologue, Bruscambille, never fails to do it again: the public at the Hôtel de Bourgogne anticipate the appearance of the comedian with farce that [...] delicately opens the mouth as wide as the entrance to a banal oven.

His works include:

- Prologues tant sérieux que facétieux (1610);
- Fantaisies (1612);
- Nouvelles et Plaisantes Imaginations (1613);
- Facétieuses Paradoxes (1615);
- Bigarures sentencieuses (1622);
- Bons Mots.

These various pieces were compiled in the "Œuvres de Bruscambille" edited in Paris by David Gilles in 1619.

He chose the pseudonym, "Bruscambille" when performing farce, and that of "(Nicolas) Deslauriers" (or "Des Lauriers") for his comedy acts.

== Saying ==
He was noted for saying "Baste! Comedy is a life without worries and sometimes without six sous."

== Literary quotations ==
In the famous satirical novel The Life and Opinions of Tristram Shandy, Gentleman by Laurence Sterne, the character of Bruscambille appears in the chapter XXXV of the vol.III, when Sterne describes the long noses of the family, remembering the prologue of a written text by Bruscambille on the topic, purchased with joy by the father of Tristram Shandy.

== Bibliography ==
- Gilles, Davie (1619). Œuvres de Bruscambille. Paris.
- Howe, Alan (1986). Bruscambille, qui était-il?, XVIIe siècle, no 153, 1986, p. 390-396. pp. 390–396.
- Mazouer, Charles (2006). Le théâtre français de l'âge classique. Vol. 1. Paris: Champion.
- Parlett, David Sidney (1991). A history of card games. Oxford University Press. ISBN 978-0-19-282905-4. OCLC 697126408.
- Rémond, François (2023). Les Héros de la farce. Répertoire des comédiens-farceurs des théâtres parisiens (1612-1686). Paris: Champion.
