= Briscan =

French card game

- Elaborate, historical French game
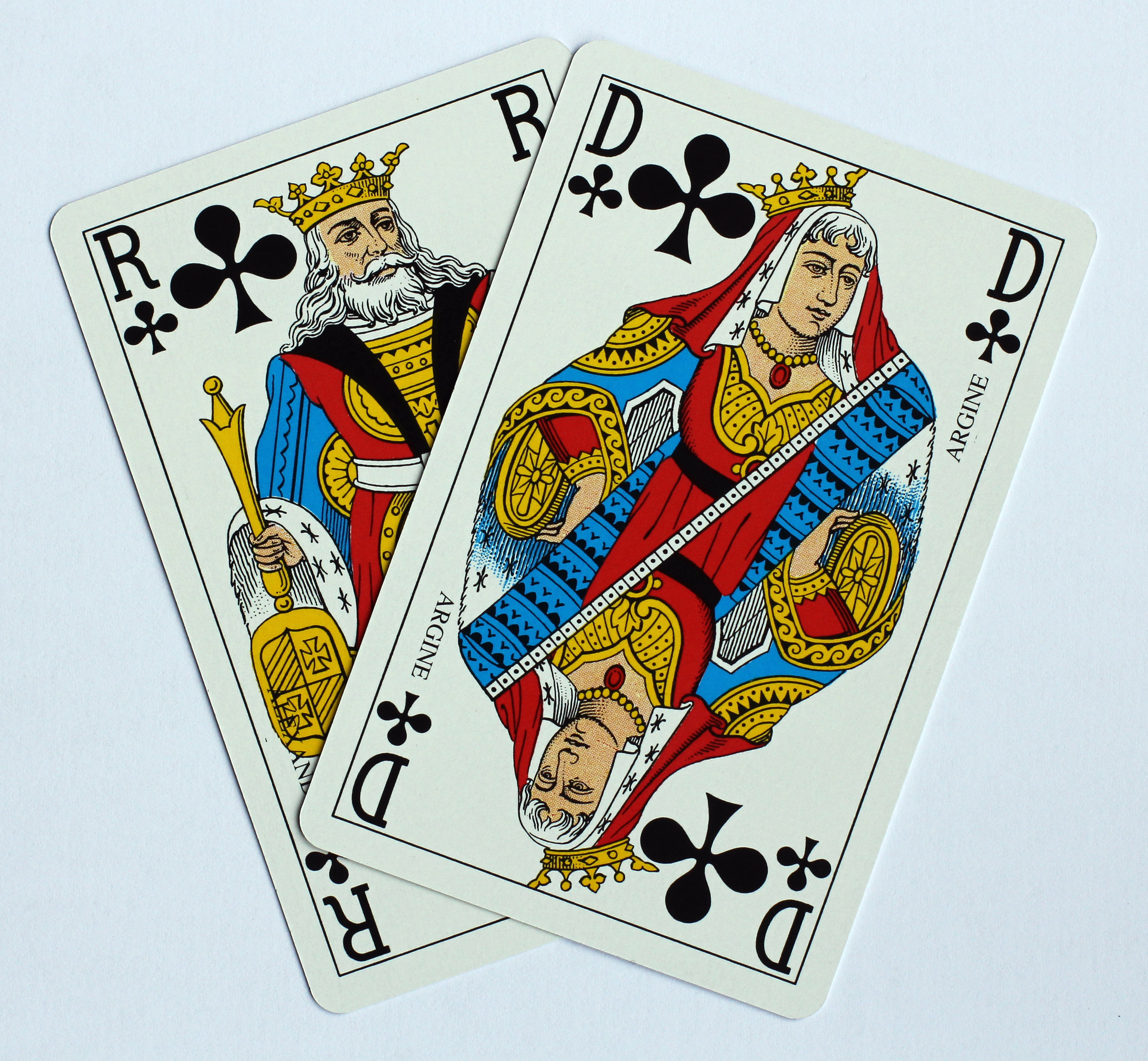
- A 'marriage' of the King and Queen of Clubs
- Origin: France
- Type: Trick-taking
- Players: 2
- Cards: 32
- Deck: Piquet pack
- Rank (high→low): A 10 K Q J 9 8 7
- Play: Alternate

Related games
- Brusquembille

Briscan is an 18th-century, French ace–ten card game for two players played with a 32-card piquet pack. It is a member of the marriage group of games in which the 'marriage' of a king and queen brings a bonus score, but briscan takes this simple concept to extraordinary lengths.

== History ==
Briscan is a highly elaborate expansion of Mariage, the ancestor of the marriage family of card games. It is also a member of the brusquembille family, a game which it began to oust in France in the late 18th century. Its name is probably a diminutive of 'briscambille', an old name for brusquembille.

The rules of briscan are first recorded in 1752 in La Plus Nouvelle Académie universelle des jeux and indicate that briscan evolved from a similar game called brisque, which, in turn, may have developed from brisquembille, whose rules were published in 1718 in the l'Académie universelle des jeux.

Parlett describes it as a "Gothic extravaganza" and a game of "almost hysterical excitement and complication" that squeezed a "truly phenomenal range of scores and melds" from just a 32-card pack and two five-card hands. By contrast its close cousin, brisque, is less complicated and more playable; as is briscan's successor and "more sober relative", bezique, which reduced the number of melds and bonuses available.

== Rules ==
The following rules are based on the French Academy of Games. Where brisque is different, this is shown in parentheses.

Briscan is a two-player game, based on brisque, but which differs in the number of cards dealt, the way the trump turnup is handled, announcements and scoring. Game is 600 points.

=== Cards and dealing ===
Briscan uses a 32-card piquet pack. Players draw for the right to deal; the player drawing the highest becoming the dealer, who then deals five cards each (brisque: six) and turns the next for trump. The remaining cards form the talon which is placed, face down, at right angles to, and half-covering, the upcard.

=== Exchanging ===
The trump seven may only be exchanged for the upcard "before playing for the last two cards of the talon" (brisque: it may be exchanged at any point during the game). In other words, when there are two talon cards left and each player has five hand cards, an exchange may only be done at the end of the trick. If the turnup is an ace, ten, or court card, the dealer scores ten points.

=== Melds and bonuses ===
Inspired by piquet, briscan has a very large number of possible melds and bonuses. Melds may only be made when at least one trick has been taken and when on lead.

==== Melds ====
There are the following melds in briscan (brisque: only marriages and 2 of the quartets count)

- Marriages: a player who holds a king and queen of the same suit scores 20 or, if a trump marriage, 40 points.
- Sequences: runs of three or more consecutive cards of the same suit e.g. ten, jack, queen. A run of three is a tierce; of four is a quatrième; and of five, a quinte. The rank of a sequence is taken from its top card, so 8-9-10 is a tierce au dix. Points are scored as per the table below, except that they are doubled in the case of trump sequences. Cards declared in a sequence may not be used for other melds.
- Quartets: four of a kind score as shown in the table. (brisque: four kings or four queens immediately win the game)
- Cartes blanches: hands comprising all court cards and no pips or, conversely, all pip cards and no courts. They attract 20 and 10 points respectively.

==== Bonuses ====
The following bonuses count in briscan (brisque: only the last trick bonus is scored)

- Ace of trumps: if the ace of trumps is held and has not been exchanged it scores 30 points
- Last five cards: if a player's last hand of five cards after the talon has been exhausted are all trumps, that player scores a bonus of 30 points.
- Winning last trick: 10 points
- Winning last five tricks: 20 additional points
- Taking most cards: 10 points
- Vole (taking all tricks): wins the game immediately

==== Summary ====
Melds in briscan
Sequences*
Quinte		Quatrième		Tierce	
majeure (major i.e. ace)	300	majeure	100	majeure	60
roi (king)	150	roi	80	roi	50
dame (queen)	100	dame	60	dame	40
valet (jack)	50	valet	40	valet	30
dix (ten)	-	dix	30	dix	20
neuf (nine)	-	neuf	-	neuf	20
Sets and other bonuses
Quartets (four of a kind)*		Other combinations		Cards and tricks	
Four aces	150	Marriage (K+Q of plain suit)	20	Last five cards	30
Four tens	100	Trump marriage (trump K+Q)	40	Last trick	10
Four kings	80	Carte blanche (all courts)	20	Last five tricks	20
Four queens	60	Carte blanche (all pips)	10	Most cards	10
Four jacks	40	Ace of trumps	30	Vole (taking all the tricks)	Game

* Scores are doubled in the case of trump sequences or quartets.

== Literature ==
- Parlett, David (1990). A History of Card Games, OUP, Oxford. ISBN 0-19-282905-X
- Parlett, David (2008). The Penguin Book of Card Games, Penguin, London. ISBN 978-0-141-03787-5
