= Château de Lavardin =

Ruined castle in Lavardin, France

Coordinates: 47°44′27″N 0°53′0″E

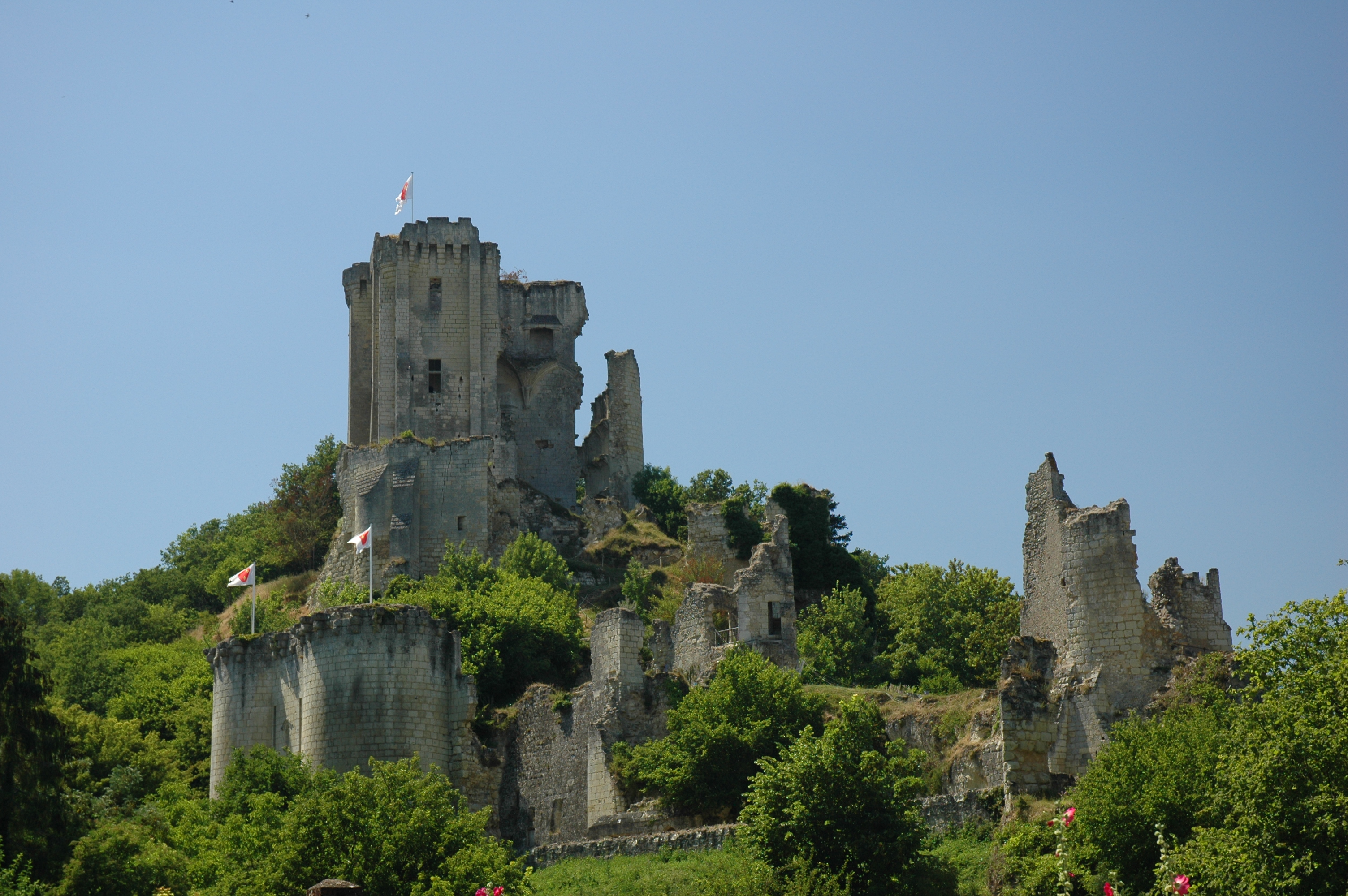
Château de Lavardin

The Château de Lavardin is a ruined castle in the village and commune of Lavardin in the Loir-et-Cher department of France. The property of the commune, it has been classified since 1945 as a monument historique by the French Ministry of Culture.

The remains of the Château de Lavardin stand on a rocky promontory, above the village and the Loir. Built starting from the beginning of the 11th century by the first lords of Lavardin, the castle was sold to the count of Vendôme around 1130, becoming his principal fortress at the end of the 12th century. Completely altered in the 14th and 15th centuries, it was taken by the members of the Catholic League in 1589, then dismantled the following year on the orders of Henri IV, duke of Vendôme and king of France.

== Description ==
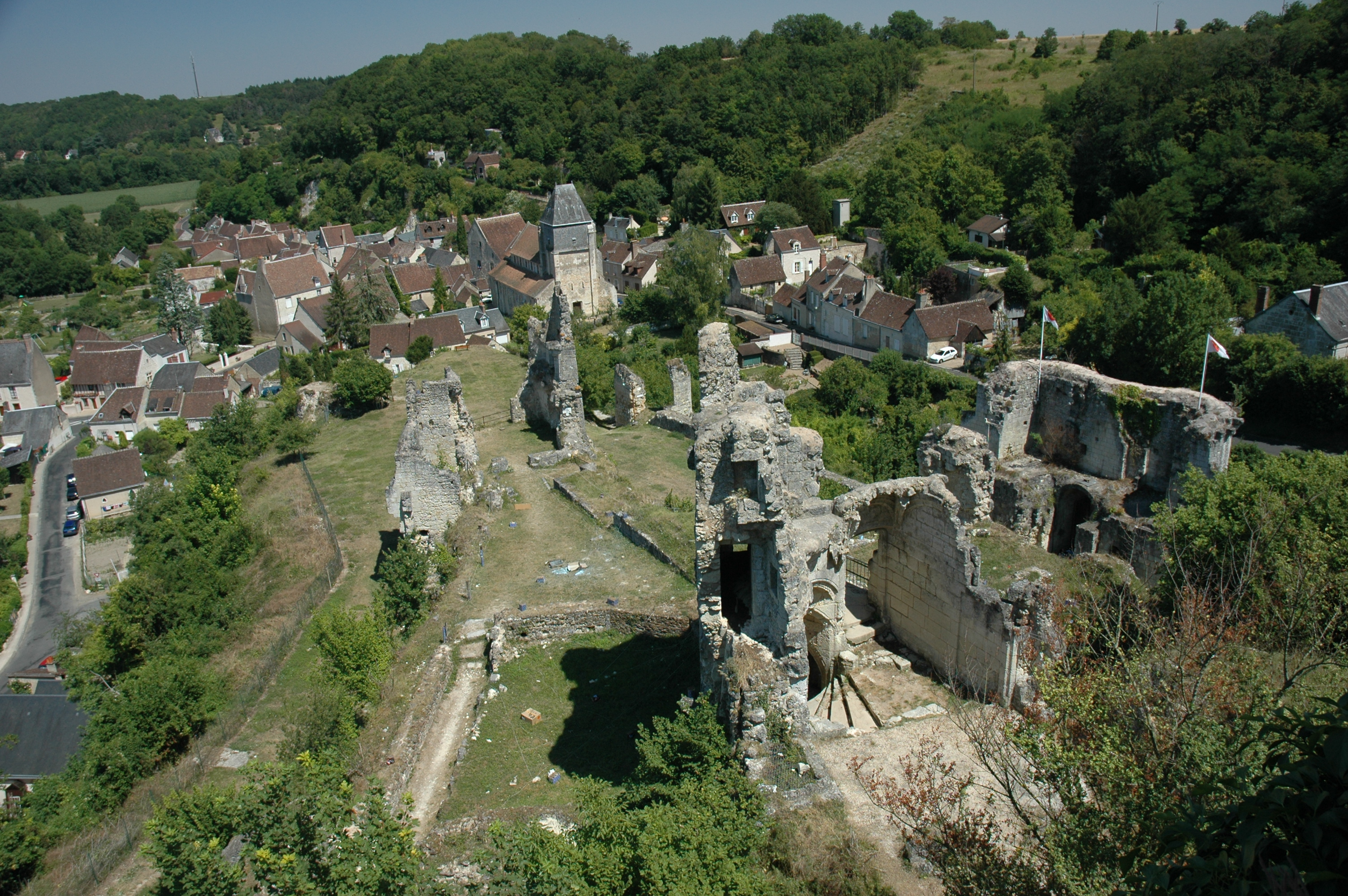

The first castle, that of Solomon de Lavardin, constructed at the beginning of the 11th century, appears to have consisted of a wooden keep on a motte, protecting a manor house on the summit of the promontory. The fortress of the counts de Vendôme from the 12th to the 15th century was composed of three or four enclosures surrounding a quadrangular keep, the whole built on three rock platforms excavated in the Middle Ages to increase the height. At the foot of the castle, between the promontory and the Loir, a further enclosure protected the priory of Saint Martin (Saint-Gildéric), founded about 1040 by the first lord of Lavardin in an external bailey. During the Early Middle Ages, the castle promontory was occupied by a cemetery, of which several ditches cut in the rock have been found.

Of the first enclosure there remains a large gatehouse or "châtelet" (12th, 14th and 15th centuries), with machicolations and embrasures for cannons (about 1400). This gateway gave access to the first level of the promontory, dedicated to the activities of the garrison and the servants. Opposite this door is the entry to the galleries and a large underground storeroom; to the north of the level is a troglodytic kitchen built into the rockface with a baker's oven.

On the second level, accessible by a staircase whose ruins are opposite the Châtelet, were several residential buildings.

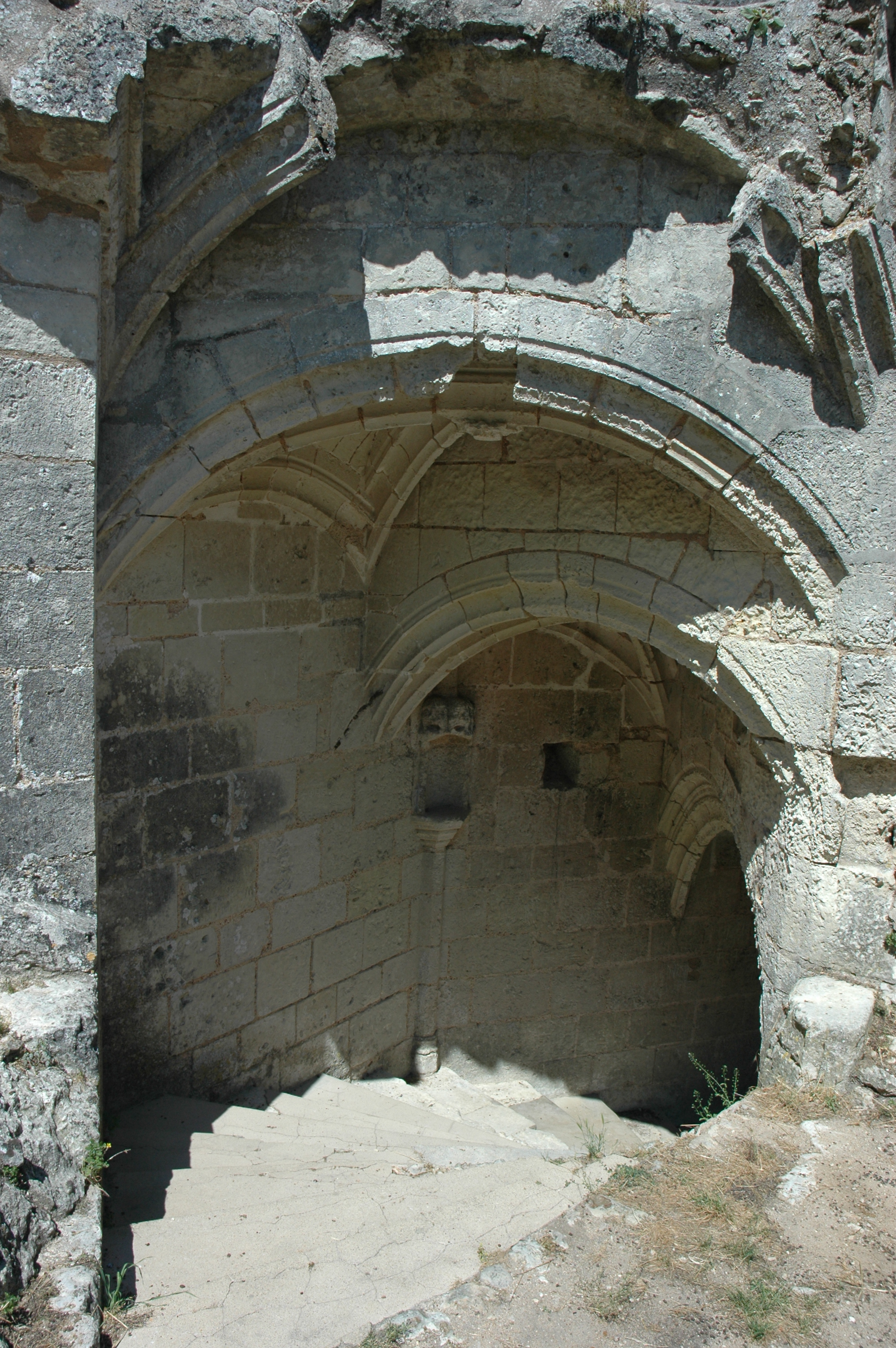

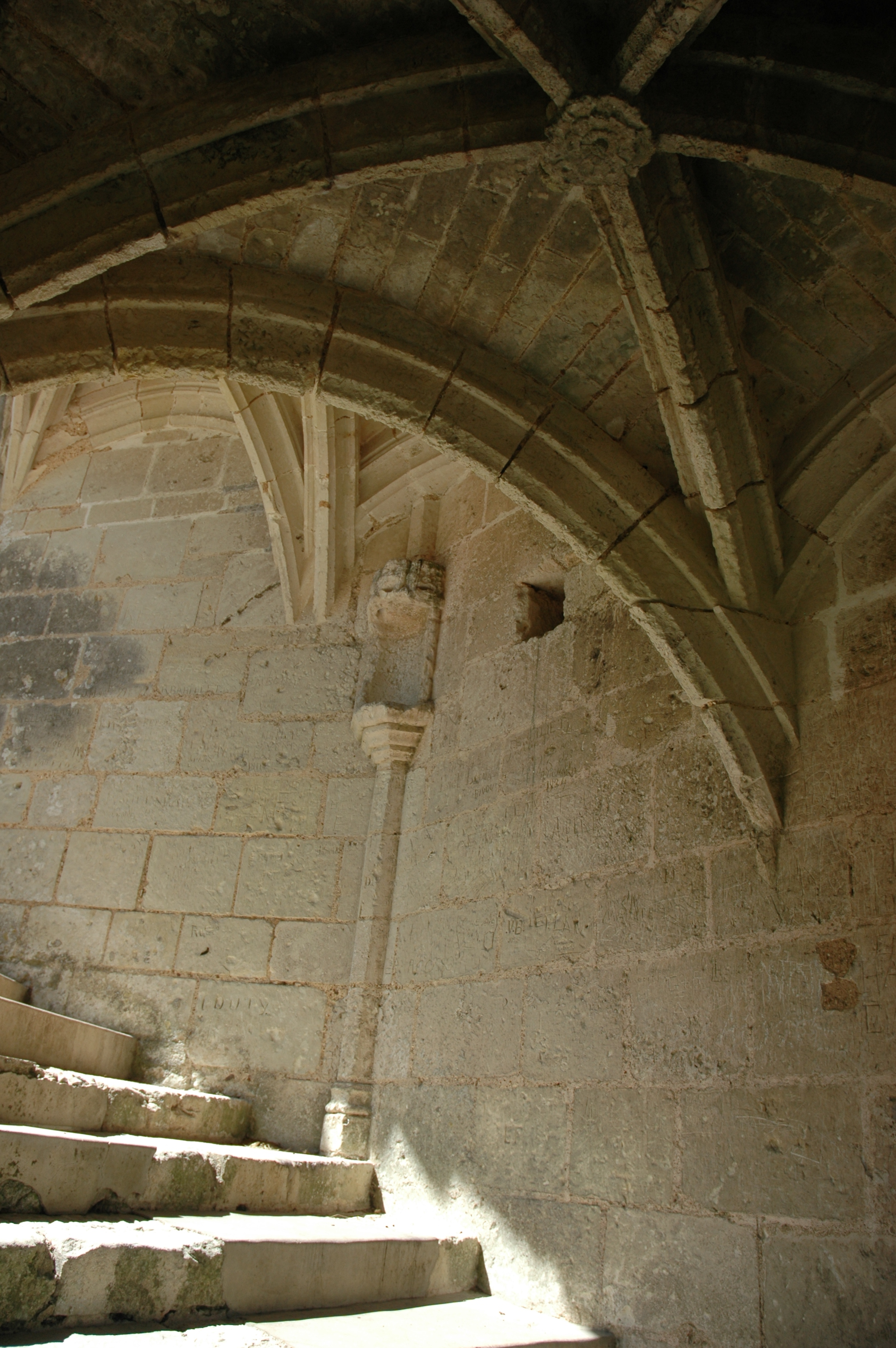

In the east, is the residence (12th, 14th, 15th centuries) which was occupied by the lord of the manor; to the north, what could be the crypt of the castle chapel (15th century); in the centre, a large ceremonial building built in the last years of the 15th century, starting from an older structure (12th century). It still has remarkable vaults with the arms of the Bourbon-Vendôme family and a niche for oil lamps decorated with three masks. A guard room (end 15th century) is installed under this staircase in order to control movement in the underground galleries.

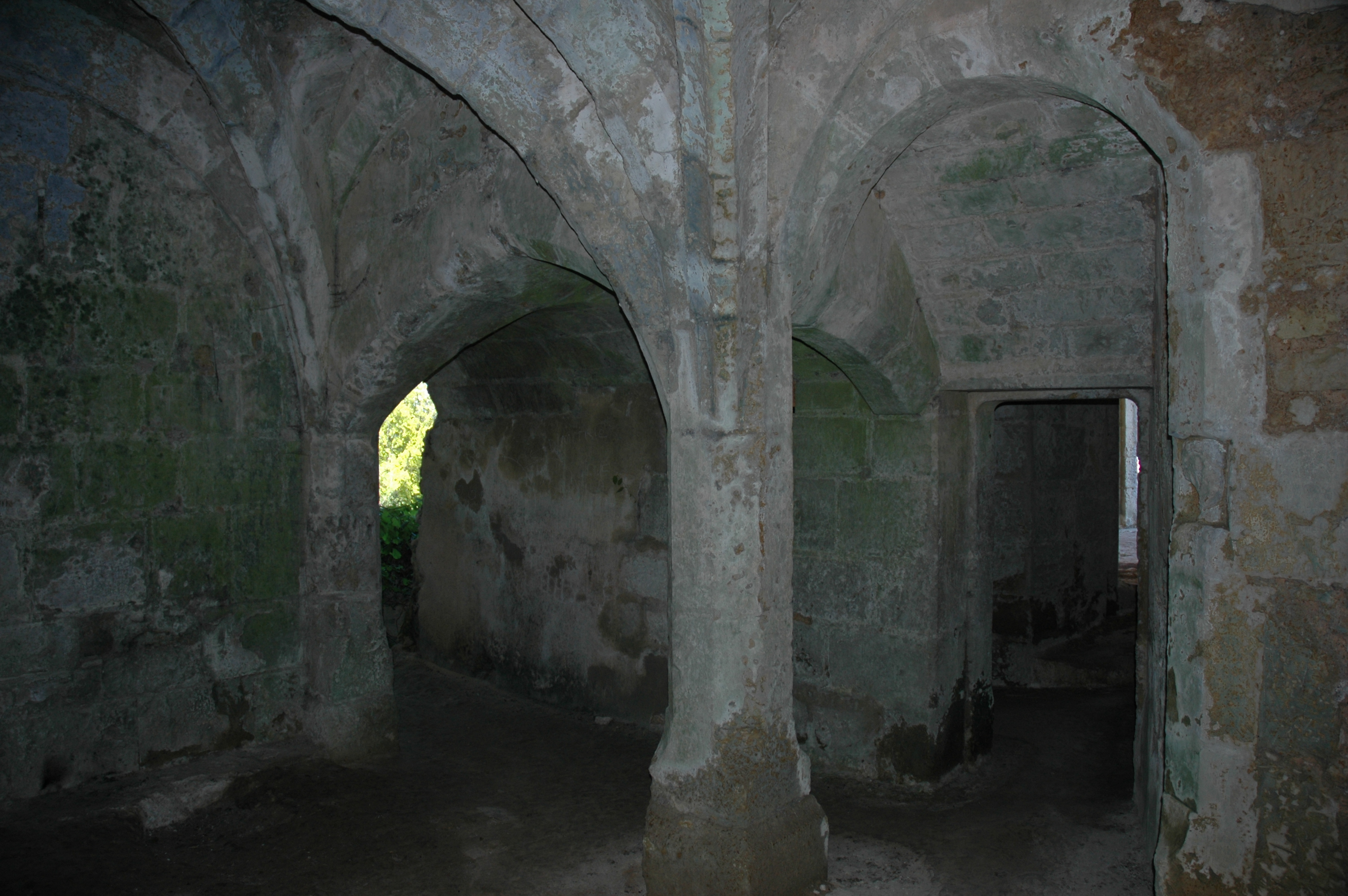

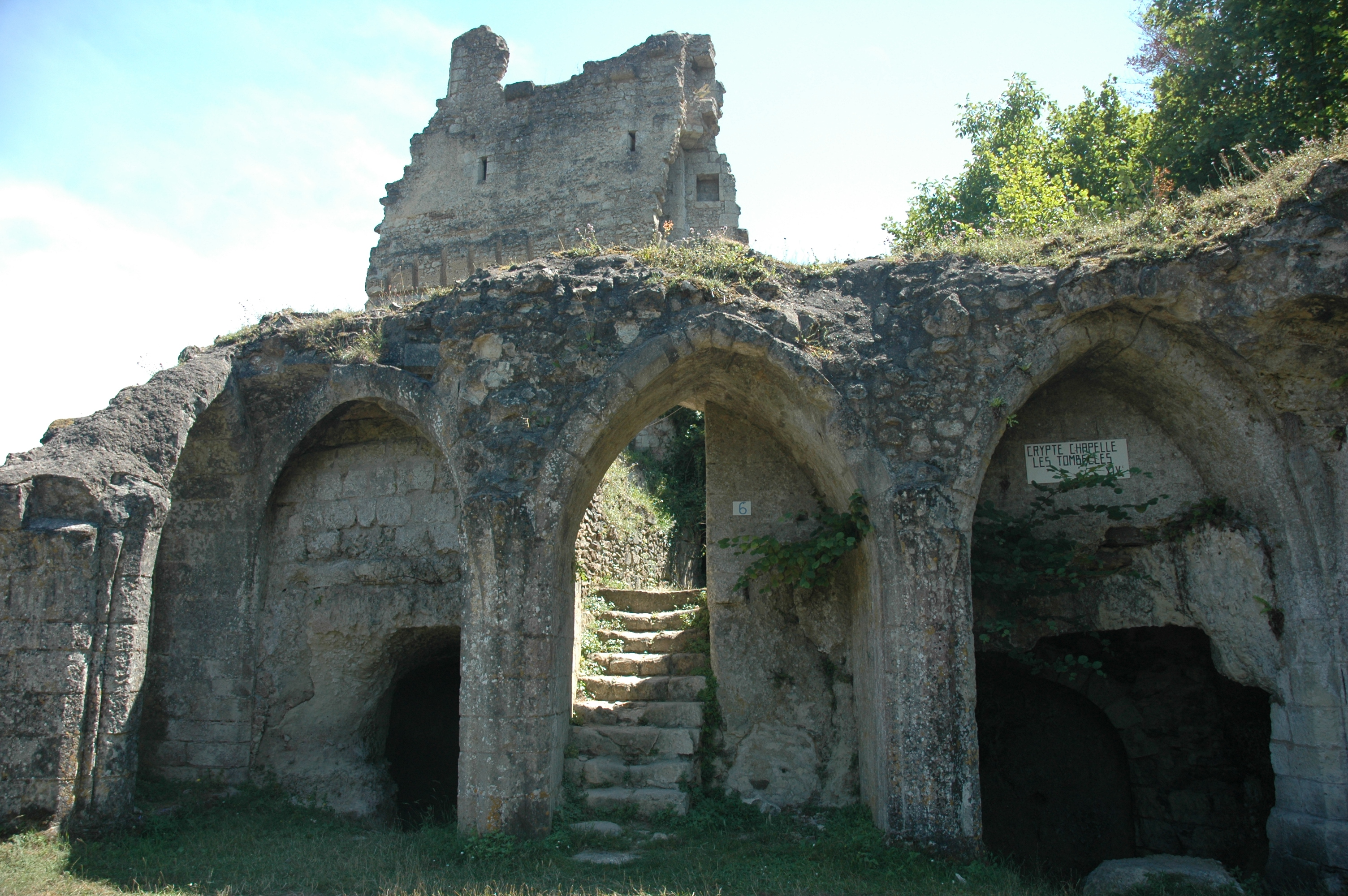

On the final level, protected by a strong curtain wall (around 1200 - 15th century) with cannon embrasures (15th century), stands an imposing rectangular keep built in the 12th century. This construction is partly founded on the walls of the residence, or "domicilium", built by the lord of Lavardin, probably in the 1070s. Reinforced by three strong towers between the end of the 12th century and the 13th century, it was rebuilt by the counts de Vendôme, between the end of the 14th and the middle of the 15th centuries. The bulk of this work is attributed to Louis I, count de Vendôme from 1393 to 1446.

With a height of 26 metres (~85 feet), the keep dominates the village and the valley.

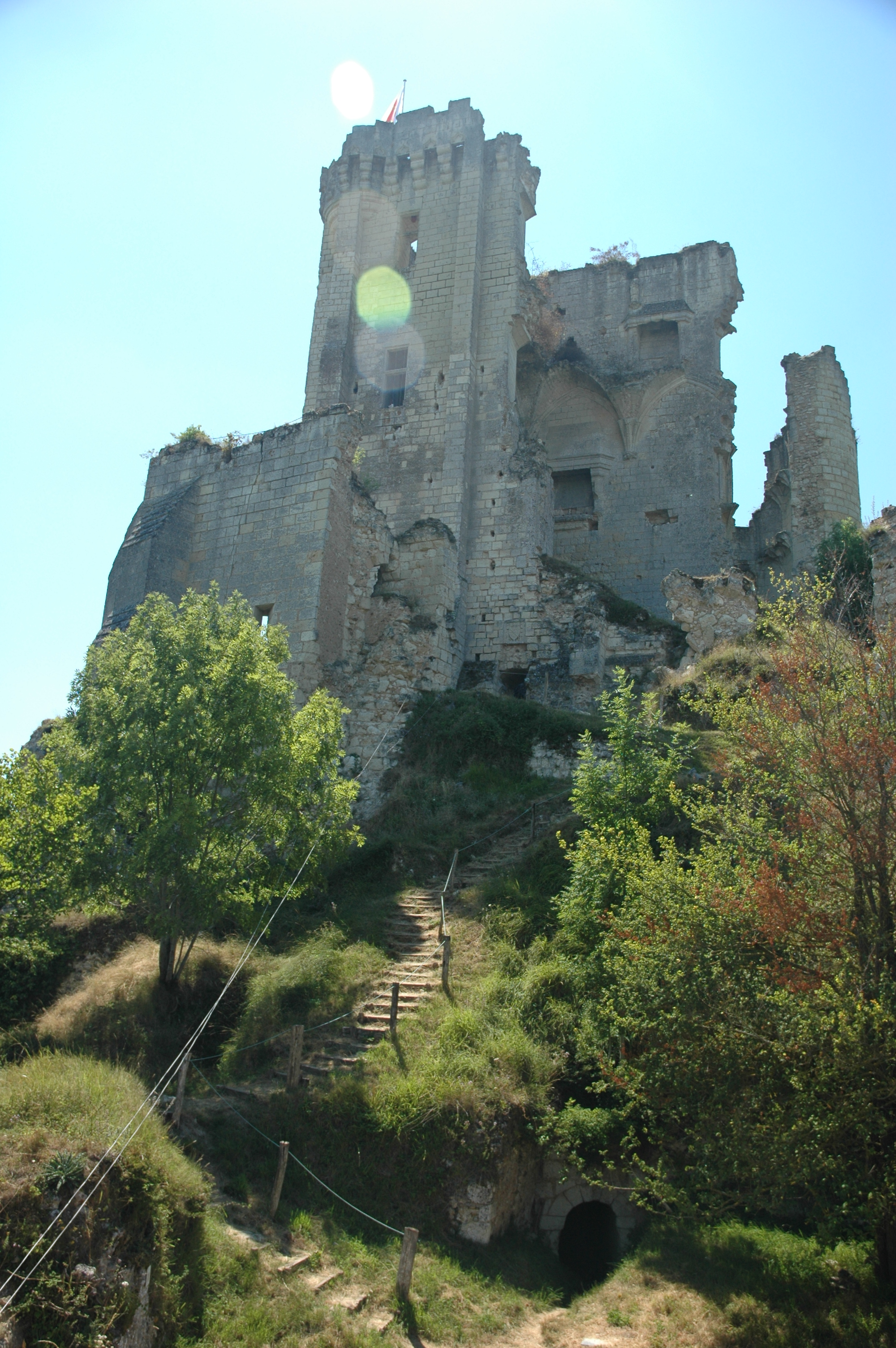

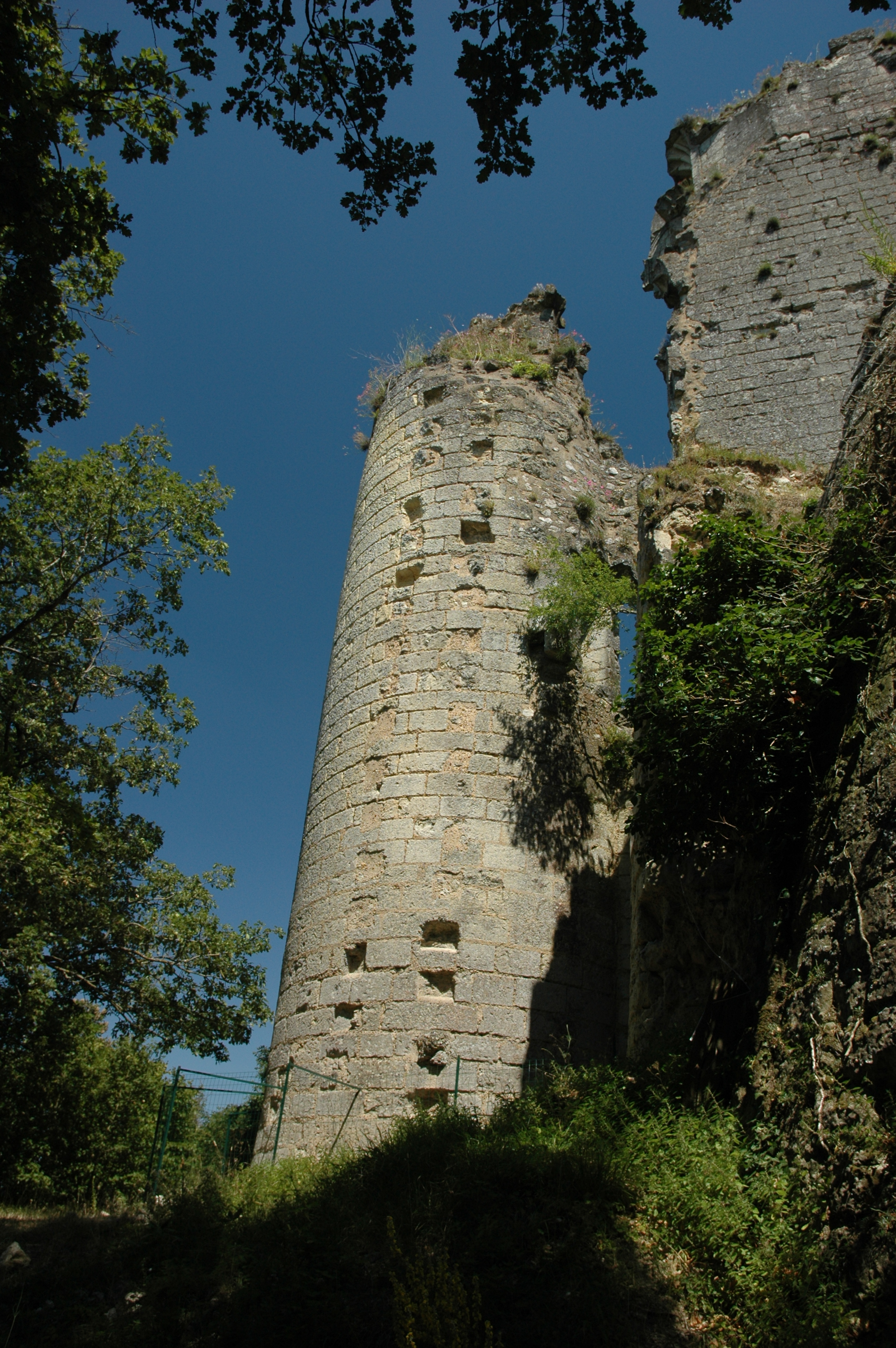

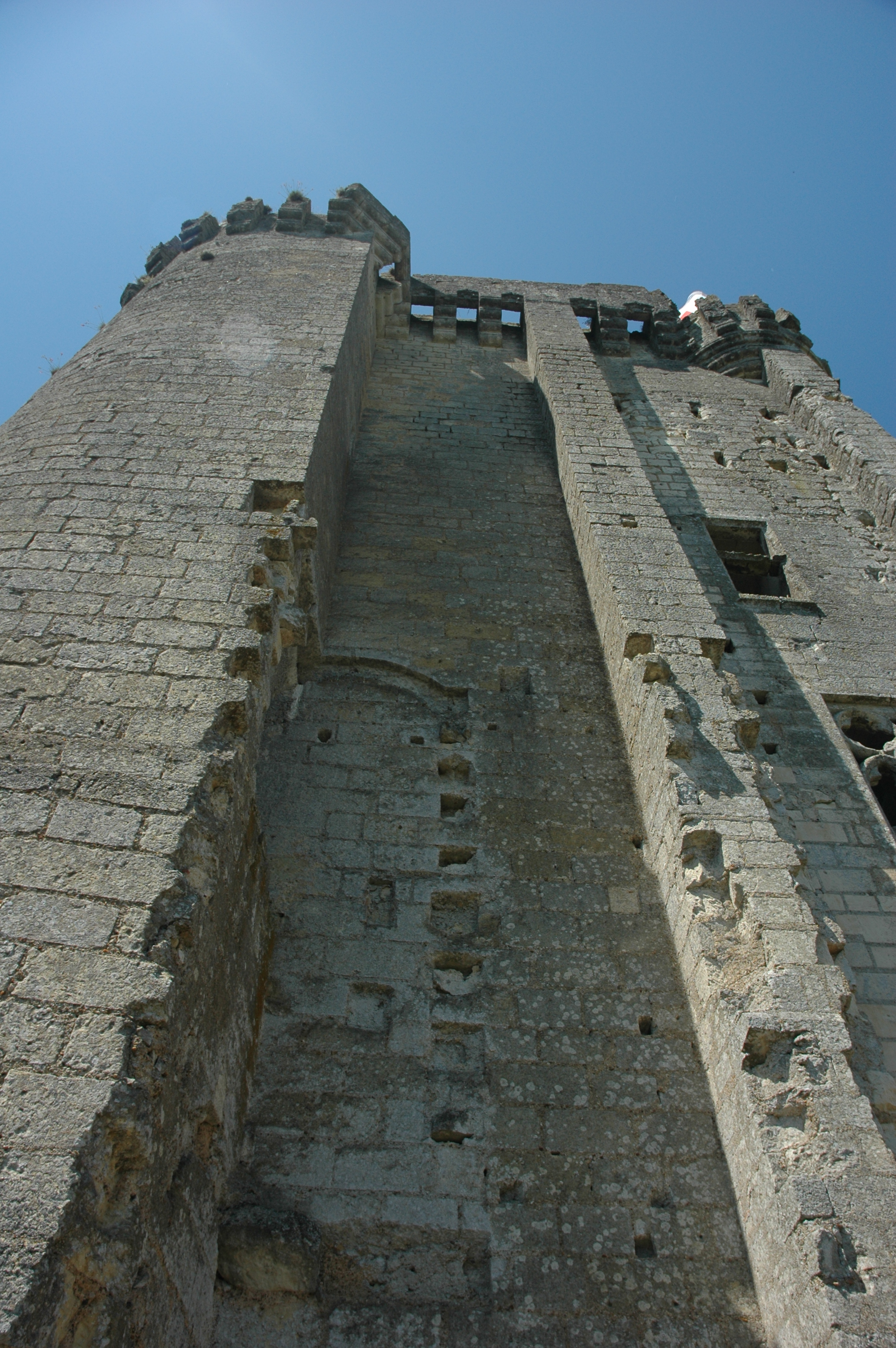

Above the door can be seen the arms of Jean VII of Bourbon-La Marche, count de Vendôme from 1372 to 1393. Higher, one can still see the remains of the door giving access to the first floor of the keep from the top of the curtain wall. Inside, the overall picture is impressive. On the first floor are a chimney with the arms of Charles VII supported by two angels (about 1420) and a multi-bayed window (14th century). Especially noteworthy are the remains of the staircase, installed about 1400 in one of the keep's 12th-century corner towers and the vaulted arches of the second floor (about 1400-1415).

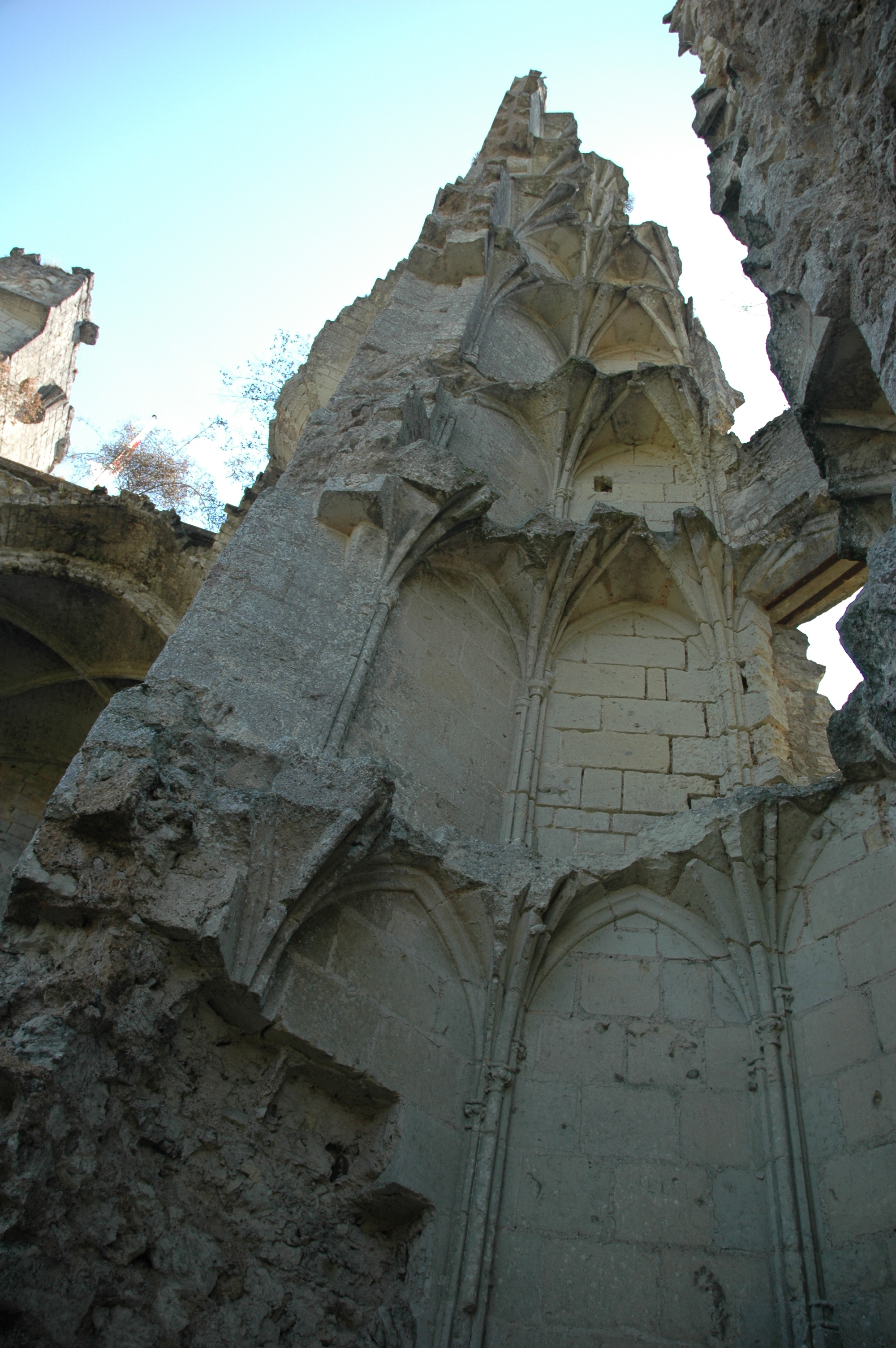

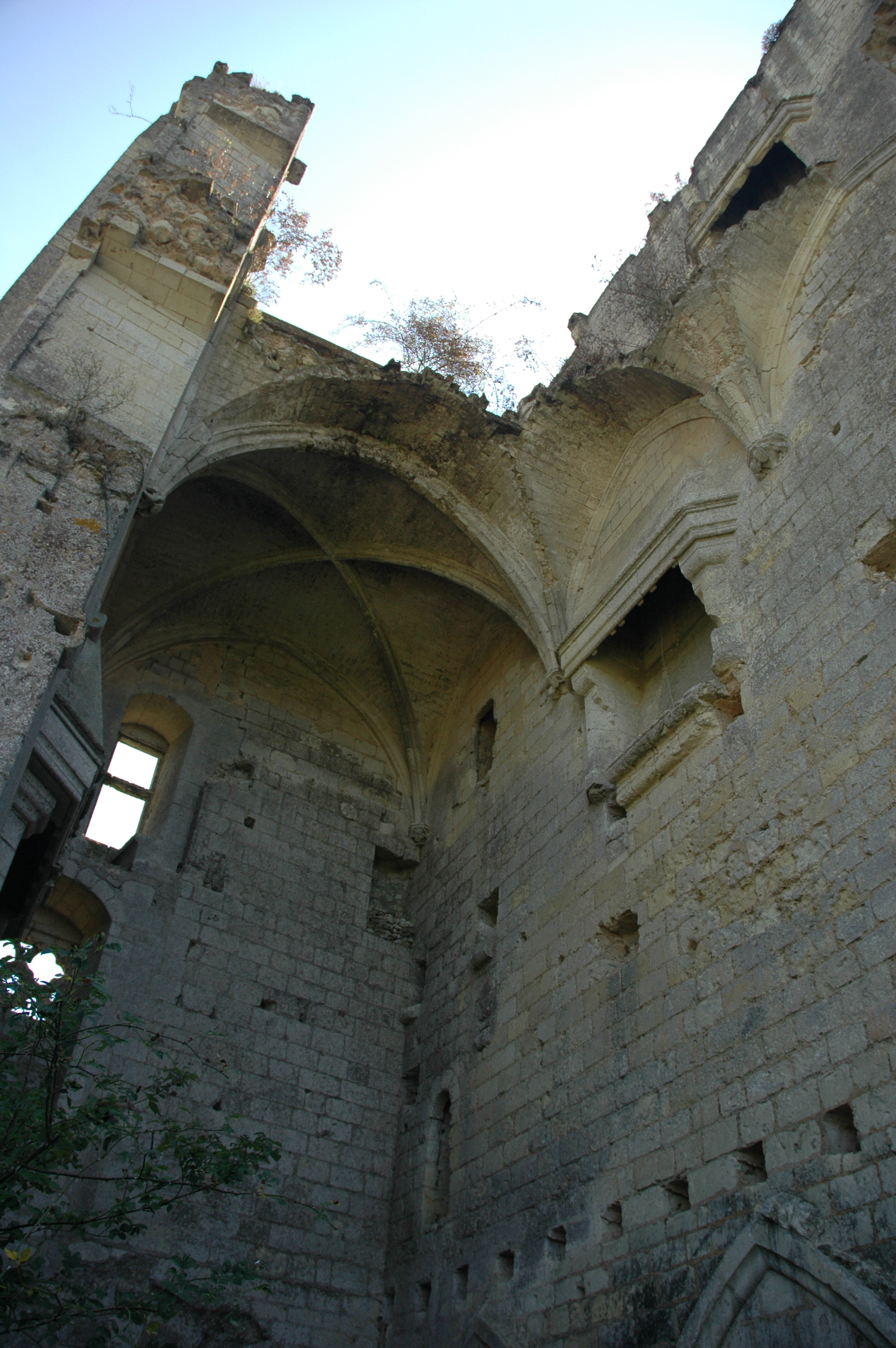

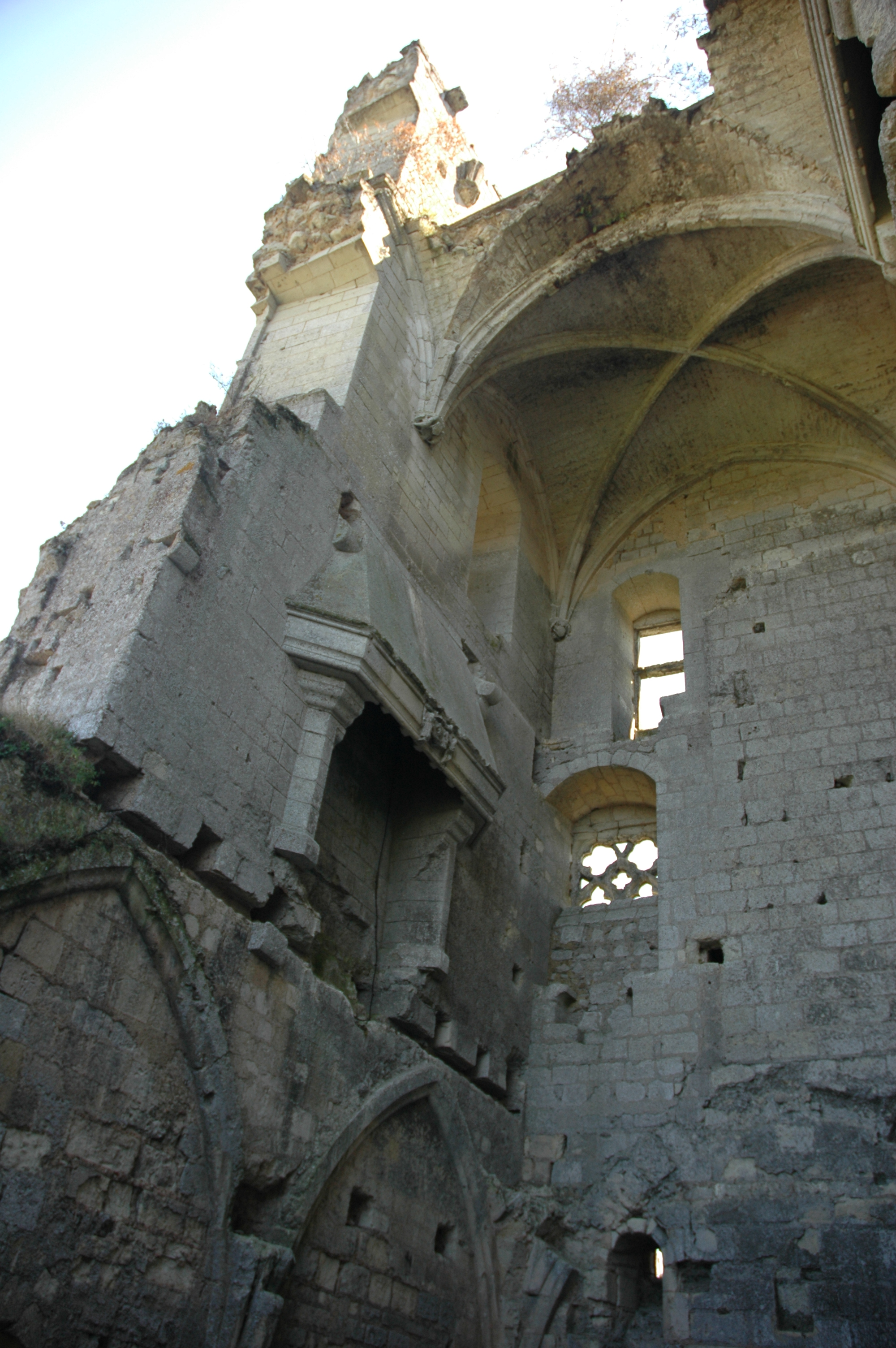

On the arch supports can be seen the armorial bearings of Louis II d'Anjou (1384–1417) and the countess of Vendôme, Alix de Bretagne (deceased in 1377). In the south-west tower is a narrow dungeon, accessible only by a well (15th century?).

On the second and third levels of the promontory, a network of galleries and underground staircases was dug, allowing access to the castle and to reach the keep and its moat (14th - 15th centuries). In the west are remains of advanced defences and, probably, the motte protecting the home from the first lords up to the 11th century. However, excavations have shown that this part of the site was occupied since protohistory, if not the Neolithic era.

== Bibliography ==
- Barthélémy, Daniel, La société dans le comté de Vendôme de l'an mil au XIVe, Paris, Fayard, 1993.
- Leymarios, Claude; Schweitz, Daniel; Lacroix, Michel, "Étude archéologique d'une crypte du haut Moyen Âge au château de Lavardin", Bulletin de la Société archéologique du Vendômois, 1979, p. 41-54.
- Métais, abbé Charles, "Procès en cours de Rome entre Vendôme et Lavardin", Bulletin de la Société archéologique du Vendômois, 1912, p. 189-231.
- Plat, Gabriel, "Lavardin", Congrès archéologique de France, 88e session, Blois, 1925, Paris, Picard, 1926, p. 315-368 [see p. 356-368th century.
- Saint-Venant, Raoul Barré de, Dictionnaire topographique, historique, biographique, généalogique et héraldique du Vendômois et de l'arrondissement de Vendôme, Blois-Vendôme, Migault, Rouilly et Chartier, 1912–1917, 4 t. [see especially : II, 1913–1914, p. 260-273rd century.
- Salies, Alexandre de, Notice sur le château de Lavardin, Tours, imp. Bouserez, 1865.
- Salies, Alexandre de, " Rapport […] sur l'excursion faite aux Roches, à Montoire, Trôo et Lavardin", Congrès archéologique de France, 39e session, Vendôme, 1872, Paris, Derache, 1873, p. 459-525 [see p. 504-525th century.
- Salies, Alexandre de, De Vendôme à la Bonnaventure, Les Roches, Lavardin, Montoire et Trôo, Angers, impr. Lachèse […], 1873 (extr. of Congrès archéologique de France, Vendôme, 1872) [see p. 49-74th century.
- Schweitz, Daniel and Arlette, "Contribution archéologique à l'étude du château de Lavardin: la cuisine troglodytique de la basse-cour et son four XIVe-XVe siècles", Bulletin de la Société archéologique du Vendômois, 1976, p. 63-73.
- Schweitz, Daniel, "Étude archéologique d'un dépotoir domestique du XIVe au château de Lavardin", Bulletin de la Société archéologique du Vendômois, 1979, p. 55-70.
- Schweitz, Daniel, "L'équipement domestique d'un châtelain du XIVe à Lavardin", in La céramique dans la région Centre de l'époque gallo-romaine au XXe, catalogue de l'exposition organisée par l'Association des conservateurs de la région Centre, musées de la région Centre, octobre 1980-décembre 1982, s. l., s.n., 1980, p. 34-42.
- Schweitz, Daniel and Arlette, "Château de Lavardin", in Congrès archéologique de France, 139e session, Blésois-Vendômois, Blois, 1981, Paris, Société française d'archéologie, 1986, p. 218-227.
- Schweitz, Daniel, "Sur l'organisation de l'espace au château de Lavardin : galeries et escaliers souterrains (XIVe et XVe siècles)", Bulletin de la Société archéologique du Vendômois, 2005, p. 69-82.
- Schweitz, Daniel, "Sur l'émergence d'une identité patrimoniale en Vendômois : l'exemple des études sur le château de Lavardin (XIXe-XXe siècles)", Bulletin de la Société archéologique du Vendômois, 2006, p. 72-93.
- Schweitz, Daniel, Châteaux et forteresses du Moyen Âge en Val de Loire : Touraine, Anjou, Berry, Orléanais, Vendômois, marche bretonne, Tours, CLD, 2006.
- Schweit, Daniel, "Sur la perception de l'identité patrimoniale du Vendômois : l'exemple des ruines de Lavardin aux XIXe et XXe siècles", Mémoires de la Société des sciences et lettres de Loir-et-Cher, 61, 2006.
- Yvard, Jean-Claude, "Sur l'existence d'un domicilium (fin du XIe) au donjon de Lavardin", BSAV, 1994, p. 27-31.
- Yvard, Jean-Claude, Le donjon résidentiel de Lavardin vers l'an 1400, Vendôme, éd. du Cherche-Lune, 1993.

== See also ==
- List of castles in France
