= Brisque =

French card game

- Historical French game of the Marriage family
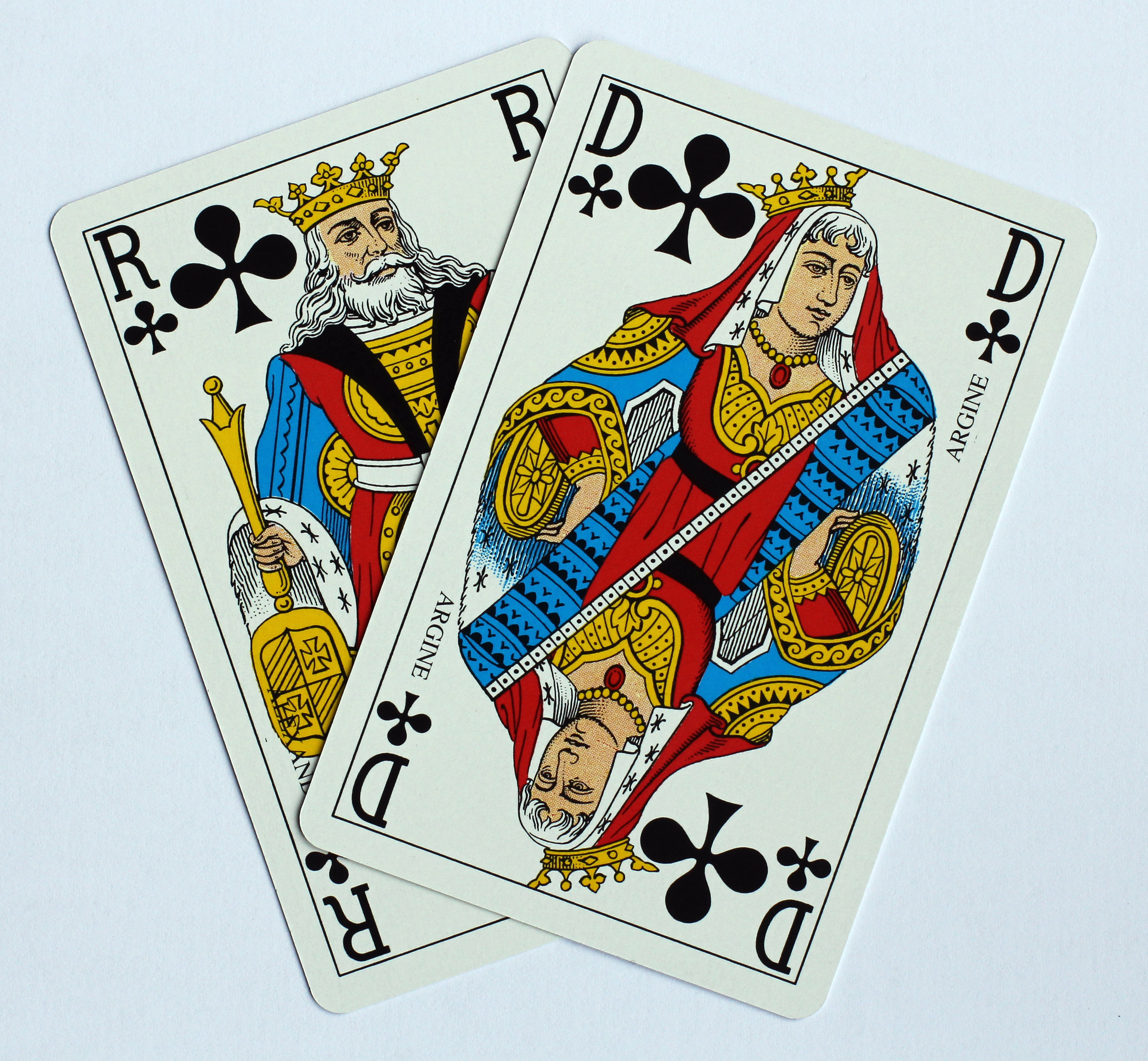
- A 'marriage' of the King and Queen of Clubs
- Origin: France
- Type: Trick-taking
- Players: 2
- Cards: 32
- Deck: Piquet pack
- Rank (high→low): A 10 K Q J 9 8 7
- Play: Alternate

Related games
- Brusquembille

Brisque is an 18th-century, French ace–ten card game for two players played with a 32-card piquet pack. It is a member of the marriage group of games in which the 'marriage' of a king and queen earns a bonus.

== History ==
Brisque was probably derived from Brusquembille which, in turn, stemmed from Mariage, the progenitor of the Marriage family of card games. The earliest rules for Brisque appear in a 1752 French-Latin dictionary which suggest it is an earlier and simpler version of Briscan, a highly elaborate game with a much larger range of declarations. However, according to Philippe Lalanne, almost all the sources have ignored the 1752 dictionary source and followed La Plus Nouvelle Académie Universelles des Jeux of the same year which equates Brisque to Brusquembille and Mariage.

Meanwhile Briscan began to oust its predecessors in France in the late 18th century.

== Name ==
The name Brisque is probably a diminutive of 'Brisquembille', an old alternative name for Brusquembille.

== Rules ==
The following rules are based on Lalanne except where stated.

The game is played with a Piquet pack i.e. 32 French-suited cards which have the usual ace–ten games ranking and values. There are the usual four suits: clubs, spades, hearts and diamonds.

There are two players and the first dealer is chosen by drawing cards from the pack - the one with the higher card deals first. The players receive six cards each and the dealer places the rest face down to one side as the talon. The thirteenth card is turned over and placed under the talon and at right angles to it, so that it is partially visible. The suit of this card becomes the trump suit.

The non-dealer leads to the first trick and, while there is a talon, players may play any card. The trick is won by the higher trump played or the higher card of the led suit if no trumps were played. The trick winner collects the trick; each player draws the next card from the talon, the trick winner first. The trick winner then leads to the next trick. Once the talon is exhausted, players must follow suit if able and overtake if possible. If unable to follow suit, they must trump.

A player with the trump 7 may exchange for the trump turnup it at any time including during the last pickup from the talon. (Note: This feature is absent from Brusquembille.)

During play players may declare the following combinations in hand and score points for them:

- Mariage: King and Queen of the same suit – 20 points, or 40 if in trumps.
- Four Kings or Four Queens: wins the hand immediately without further play

Cards used for a Mariage may be used for Four Kings or Four Queens.

The winner of the last trick scores 10 points.

At the end of the hand, points in cards are added to any points from declarations. Game is e.g. 300 or 500 points and may consist of several hands.

== Petite Brisque ==
Early 19th century sources also record an unrelated game called Petite Brisque. This is a two-hand, plain-trick game in which players receive five cards each, the next being turned for trump. There are no declarations and, from the outset, players must follow suit if able or trump if unable to follow. The winner is the one with the most tricks. The trump 7 may be exchanged with the turnup. (Note: See e.g. Lebrun (1828) and Méry (1847).)

== Bibliography ==
- _ (1752). Supplément au Dictionnaire Universel François et Latin. Paris.
- Lebrun, M. (1828). Manuel des Jeux de Calcul et de Hazard. Paris: Roret.
- Méry, Joseph (1847). L'arbitre des Jeux. Paris.
