= Lavardin, Loir-et-Cher =

Lavardin
- Commune
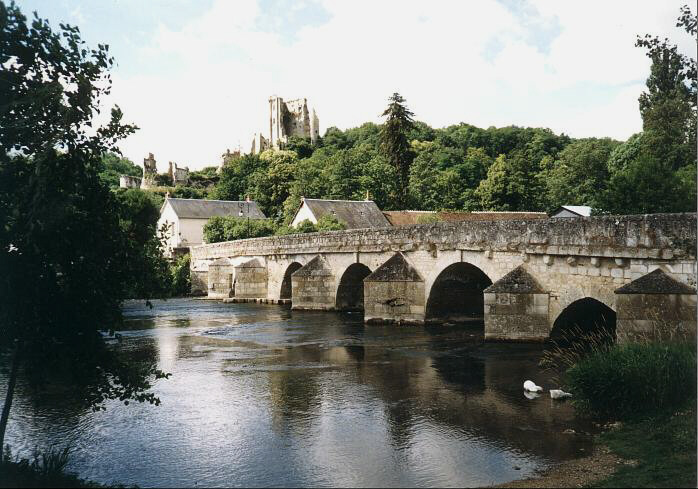
- The 14th-century bridge and 15th-18th-century château

- Coat of arms
- Location of Lavardin
- Location within France Location within Centre-Val de Loire
- Coordinates: 47°44′33″N 0°53′13″E
- Country: France
- Region: Centre-Val de Loire
- Department: Loir-et-Cher
- Arrondissement: Vendôme
- Canton: Montoire-sur-le-Loir
- Intercommunality: CA Territoires Vendômois

Government
  - Mayor (2020–2026): Thiérry Fleury
- Area^{1}: 6.71 km^{2} (2.59 sq mi)
- Elevation: 71 m (233 ft)
- Highest elevation: 146 m (479 ft)
- Lowest elevation: 63 m (207 ft)
- Population (2023): 179
  - Density: 26.7/km^{2} (69.1/sq mi)
- Time zone: UTC+01:00 (CET)
  - Summer (DST): UTC+02:00 (CEST)
- INSEE/Postal code: 41113 /41800
- ^{1} French Land Register data, which excludes lakes, ponds, glaciers > 1 km^{2} (0.386 sq mi or 247 acres) and river estuaries.

Lavardin is a commune in the Loir-et-Cher department of central France. It is located on the banks of the river Loir. It is a member of Les Plus Beaux Villages de France (The Most Beautiful Villages of France) Association.

== Population ==
Historical population
Year	Pop.	±% p.a.
1968	268	—
1975	222	−2.65%
1982	256	+2.06%
1990	245	−0.55%
1999	262	+0.75%
2007	220	−2.16%
2012	199	−1.99%
2017	183	−1.66%
2023	179	−0.37%
Source: INSEE

== Sights ==
Lavardin is classified as one of the most beautiful villages of France thanks to the ruins of its mediaeval castle (see main article: Château de Lavardin), its Gothic church and frescoes, its houses and the ancient bridge. The village has been frequented by renowned painters since about 1900, most notably Busson and Sauvage.

== Early history ==
Salomon I of Lavardin became lord of Lavardin around 1030, and his descendants ruled there for the next three centuries. The church of St. Genest in Lavardin was built in the mid-to-late eleventh century, but the existence of a prior Merovingian cemetery on the site attests to the village's existence for several centuries prior to Salomon's reign.

== Culture ==
The historical card game of Chouine has had a renaissance in recent years and 'world championships' are currently held annually in the village.
