= Piquet pack =

Pack of 32 French suited playing cards

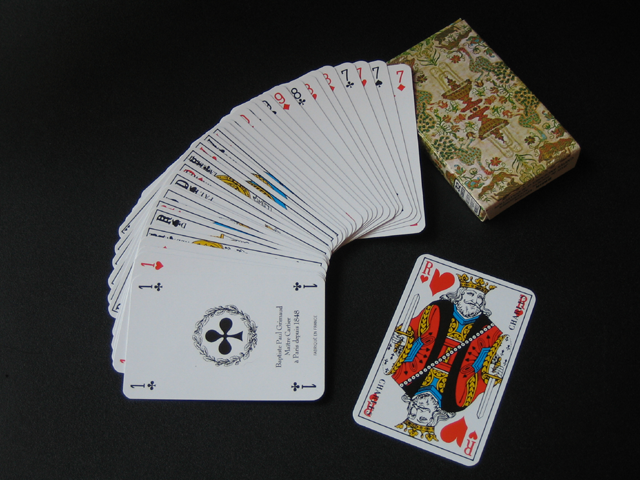
A Piquet pack

A Piquet pack or, less commonly, a Piquet deck, is a pack of 32 French suited cards that is used for a wide range of card games. The name derives from the game of Piquet which was commonly played in Britain and elsewhere in Europe until the 20th century and is still occasionally played by connoisseurs. In the Netherlands it is referred to as a Jass pack, a term derived from games of the Jass type.

Also referred to as Piquet cards, Piquet packs are still produced as standard packs of cards today, especially in Europe, for example to play the German national game of Skat. A Piquet pack also may be formed from a standard 52-card French pack by simply removing the Deuces, Treys, Fours, Fives and Sixes.

== History ==
The French Piquet pack originally comprised 36 cards, but was reduced to 32 cards around 1700. The 36-card packs continued to be produced in France until at least 1775, but thereafter became extinct. It is known that, in England, the game of Maw was played with a 36-card pack up to the end of the 17th century.

== Games played with the Piquet pack ==
Well-known games played with a Piquet pack include the following:

- Belote, France's national card game, very similar to the Dutch Klaberjass.
- Bête, a gambling game and descendant of Ombre
- Bezique, "one of the most illustrious games of European high society" for which 2 packs are needed.
- Écarté, a formerly popular, European two-hander.
- Euchre, popular in Canada and the Midwestern United States.
- Hope Deferred, a patience or solitaire game.
- Klaverjas, the Dutch invented "international, classic two-hander".
- Little Lots, another popular patience or solitaire game.
- Piquet, one of the oldest card games still being played.
- Préférence, a popular Austrian, Russian and Eastern European game. (Note: Préférence is also played with a German-suited Tell pack.)
- Rams and other gambling games of the Rams group.
- Skat, Germany's national card game. (Note: Skat is also played with a German-suited Skat pack.)

== See also ==
- List of traditional card and tile packs

== Bibliography ==
- _ (1918). Notes and Queries. Oxford: OUP.
- Dummett, Michael (1980). The Game of Tarot. Duckworth, London. ISBN 0 7156 1014 7
- Parlett, D. (1991). A History of Card Games. Oxford paperbacks. Oxford University Press. ISBN 978-0-19-282905-4.
- Singer, Samuel Weller (1816). Researches Into the History of Playing Cards. London: T. Bensley & Son.
